= Points of the compass =

Directional divisions marked on a compass

32-point compass rose

The points of the compass are a set of horizontal, radially arrayed compass directions (or azimuths) used in navigation and cartography. A compass rose is primarily composed of four cardinal directions—north, east, south, and west—each separated by 90 degrees, and secondarily divided by four ordinal (intercardinal) directions—northeast, southeast, southwest, and northwest—each located halfway between two cardinal directions. Some disciplines such as meteorology and navigation further divide the compass with additional azimuths. Within European tradition, a fully defined compass has 32 "points" (and any finer subdivisions are described in fractions of points).

Compass points or compass directions are valuable in that they allow a user to refer to a specific azimuth in a colloquial fashion, without having to compute or remember degrees.

== Designations ==
The names of the compass point directions follow these rules:

=== 8-wind compass rose ===
8-wind compass rose

- The four cardinal directions are north (N), east (E), south (S), west (W), at 90° angles on the compass rose.
- The four intercardinal (or ordinal) directions are formed by bisecting the above, giving: northeast (NE), southeast (SE), southwest (SW), and northwest (NW). In English and many other tongues, these are compound words. Different style guides for the four mandate spaces, dashes, or none.
  - In Bulgarian, Catalan, Czech, Danish, Dutch, English, Esperanto, French, Galician, German, Greek, Hungarian, Ido, Italian, Japanese (usually), Macedonian, Norwegian (both Bokmal and Nynorsk), Polish, Portuguese, Romanian, Romansch, Russian, Serbian, Croatian, Spanish, Swedish, Turkish, Ukrainian, and Welsh the part meaning north or south precedes the part meaning east or west.
  - In Chinese, Vietnamese, Gaelic, and less commonly Japanese, the part meaning east or west precedes the other.
  - In Estonian, Finnish, Breton, the "Italianate system" (see section "Traditional Mediterranean compass points" below), and many South Asian and Southeast Asian languages such as Telugu, the intercardinals have distinct words.
- The eight principal winds (or main winds) are the set union of the cardinals and intercardinals. Taken in turn, each is 45° from the next. These form the 8-wind compass rose, the rose at its usual basic level today.

=== 16-wind compass rose ===
16-point compass rose

- The eight half-winds are the direction points obtained by bisecting the angles between the principal winds. The half-winds are north-northeast (NNE), east-northeast (ENE), east-southeast (ESE), south-southeast (SSE), south-southwest (SSW), west-southwest (WSW), west-northwest (WNW), and north-northwest (NNW). The name of each half-wind is constructed by combining the names of the principal winds to either side, with the cardinal wind coming first and the intercardinal wind second.
- The eight principal winds and the eight half-winds together form the 16-wind compass rose, with each compass point at a 22 1/2° angle from its two neighbours.

=== 32-wind compass rose ===
32-point compass rose

Azimuth	Cardinal direction	Intercardinal direction	Secondary intercardinal direction	Tertiary intercardinal direction
0°	North			
11¼°				NbE
22½°			NNE	
33¾°				NEbN
45°		NE		
56¼°				NEbE
67½°			ENE	
78¾°				EbN
90°	East			
101¼°				EbS
112½°			ESE	
123¾°				SEbE
135°		SE		
146¼°				SEbS
157½°			SSE	
168¾°				SbE
180°	South			
191¼°				SbW
202½°			SSW	
213¾°				SWbS
225°		SW		
236¼°				SWbW
247½°			WSW	
258¾°				WbS
270°	West			
281¼°				WbN
292½°			WNW	
303¾°				NWbW
315°		NW		
326¼°				NWbN
337½°			NNW	
348¾°				NbW

- The sixteen quarter-winds are the direction points obtained by bisecting the angles between each of the points in the 16 sets of two adjacent points on the 16-wind compass rose (above). The resulting directions, named quarter-winds, are as follows (here arranged by quadrant, or in other words clockwise):
  - in NE quadrant: north by east (NbE), northeast by north (NEbN), northeast by east (NEbE), and east by north (EbN);
  - in SE quadrant: east by south (EbS), southeast by east (SEbE), southeast by south (SEbS), and south by east (SbE);
  - in SW quadrant: south by west (SbW), southwest by south (SWbS), southwest by west (SWbW), and west by south (WbS);
  - in NW quadrant: west by north (WbN), northwest by west (NWbW), northwest by north (NWbN), and north by west (NbW)
- All of the points in the 16-wind compass rose plus the sixteen quarter-winds together form the 32-wind compass rose.
- If breaking down for study/signalling the subcomponents are called the "principal" followed by the "cardinal" wind/direction. As a mnemonic (memory device), minds familiar encode the meaning of "X by Y" as "one small measure from X towards Y". It can be noted such measure ('one point') is 11 1/4°. So, for example, "northeast by east" means "one quarter of the gap from NE towards E".

In summary, the 32-wind compass rose comes from the eight principal winds, eight half-winds, and sixteen quarter-winds combined, with each compass point at an 11 1/4° angle from the next.

==== Half- and quarter-points ====
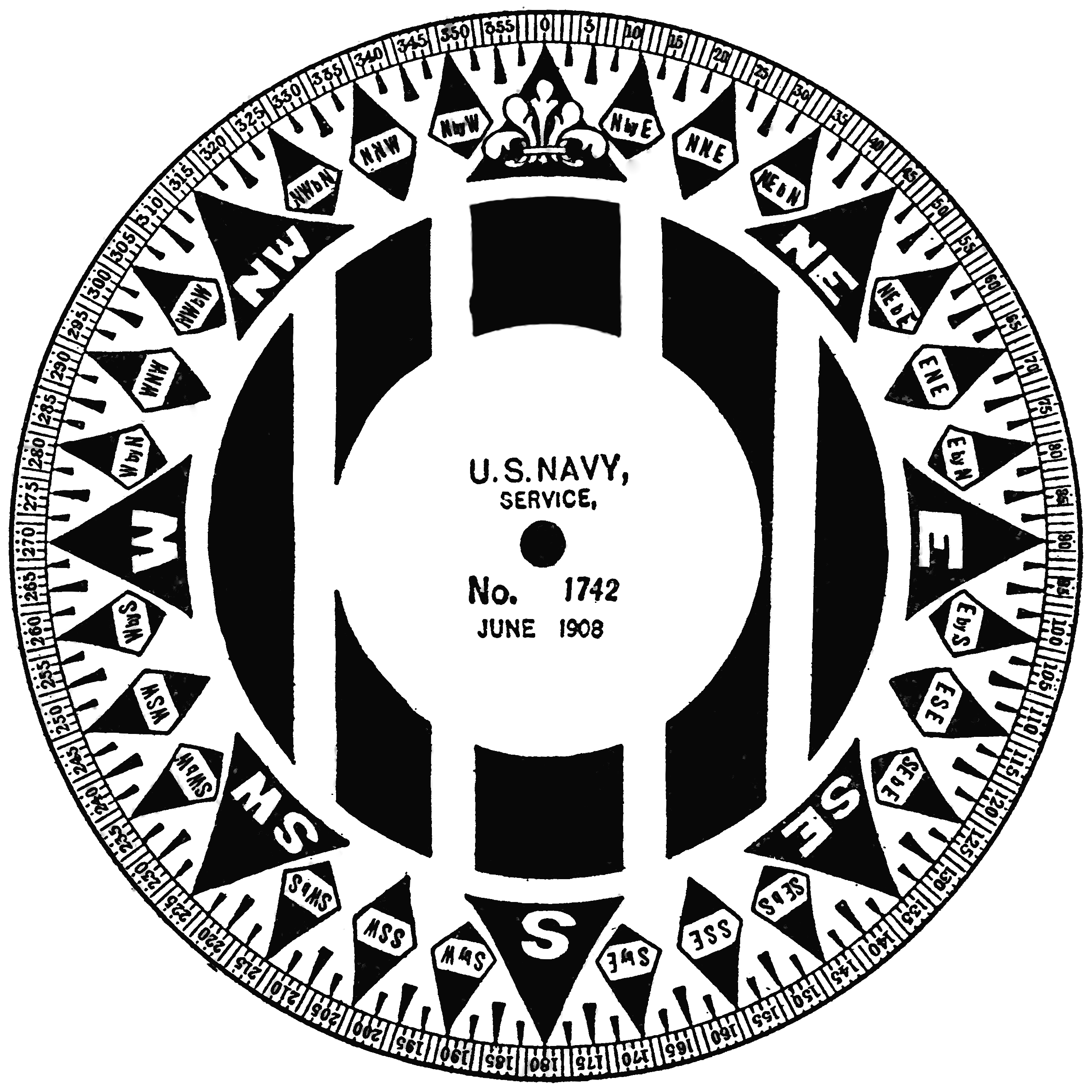
Compass rose from American Practical Navigator, 1916

By the middle of the 18th century, the 32-point system had been further extended by using half- and quarter-points to give a total of 128 directions. These fractional points are named by appending, for example, 1/4east, 1/2east, or 3/4east to the name of one of the 32 points. Each of the 96 fractional points can be named in two ways, depending on which of the two adjoining whole points is used, for example, N3/4E is equivalent to NbE1/4N. Either form is easily understood, but alternative conventions as to correct usage developed in different countries and organisations. "It is the custom in the United States Navy to box from north and south toward east and west, with the exception that divisions adjacent to a cardinal or inter-cardinal point are always referred to that point." The Royal Navy used the additional "rule that quarter points were never read from a point beginning and ending with the same letter".

Compass roses very rarely named the fractional points and only showed small, unlabelled markers as a guide for helmsmen.

==== Maritime use ====
Prior to the modern three-figure method of describing directions (using the 360° of a circle), the 32-point compass was used for directions on most ships, especially among European crews. The smallest unit of measure recognized was 'one point', 1/32 of a circle, or 11 1/4°. In the mariner's exercise of "boxing the compass", all thirty-two points of the compass are named in clockwise order. This exercise became more significant as navigation improved and the half- and quarter-point system increased the number of directions to include in the 'boxing'. Points remained the standard unit until switching to the three-figure degree method. These points were also used for relative measurement, so that an obstacle might be noted as 'two points off the starboard bow', meaning two points clockwise of straight ahead, 22 1/2° This relative measurement may still be used in shorthand on modern ships, especially for handoffs between outgoing and incoming helmsmen, as the loss of granularity is less significant than the brevity and simplicity of the summary.

=== 128 compass directions ===
The table below shows how each of the 128 directions are named. The first two columns give the number of points and degrees clockwise from north. The third gives the equivalent bearing to the nearest degree from north or south towards east or west. The "CW" column gives the fractional-point bearings increasing in the clockwise direction and "CCW" counterclockwise. The final three columns show three common naming conventions: No "by" avoids the use of "by" with fractional points, U.S. Navy increases counterclockwise from a cardinal directly to the previous direction and clockwise elsewhere, and Royal Navy is the same but also uses counterclockwise from S to SbE to SSE and N to NbW to NNW. Colour coding shows whether each of the three naming systems matches the "CW" or "CCW" column.

Naming of points on 128-point compass
Points	Degrees	Bearing	CW	CCW	No "by"	United States Navy (USN)	Royal Navy (RN)
0	0° 0′ 0″	N	N				
1/4	2° 48′ 45″	N 3° E	N1/4E	NbE3/4N	N1/4E		
1/2	5° 37′ 30″	N 6° E	N1/2E	NbE1/2N	N1/2E		
3/4	8° 26′ 15″	N 8° E	N3/4E	NbE1/4N	N3/4E		
1	11° 15′ 0″	N 11° E	NbE				
1 1/4	14° 3′ 45″	N 14° E	NbE1/4E	NNE3/4N		NbE1/4E	
1 1/2	16° 52′ 30″	N 17° E	NbE1/2E	NNE1/2N		NbE1/2E	
1 3/4	19° 41′ 15″	N 20° E	NbE3/4E	NNE1/4N		NbE3/4E	
2	22° 30′ 0″	N 23° E	NNE				
2 1/4	25° 18′ 45″	N 25° E	NNE1/4E	NEbN3/4N	NNE1/4E		
2 1/2	28° 7′ 30″	N 28° E	NNE1/2E	NEbN1/2N	NNE1/2E		
2 3/4	30° 56′ 15″	N 31° E	NNE3/4E	NEbN1/4N	NNE3/4E		
3	33° 45′ 0″	N 34° E	NEbN				
3 1/4	36° 33′ 45″	N 37° E	NEbN1/4E	NE3/4N			
3 1/2	39° 22′ 30″	N 39° E	NEbN1/2E	NE1/2N			
3 3/4	42° 11′ 15″	N 42° E	NEbN3/4E	NE1/4N			
4	45° 0′ 0″	N 45° E	NE				
4 1/4	47° 48′ 45″	N 48° E	NE1/4E	NEbE3/4N	NE1/4E		
4 1/2	50° 37′ 30″	N 51° E	NE1/2E	NEbE1/2N	NE1/2E		
4 3/4	53° 26′ 15″	N 53° E	NE3/4E	NEbE1/4N	NE3/4E		
5	56° 15′ 0″	N 56° E	NEbE				
5 1/4	59° 3′ 45″	N 59° E	NEbE1/4E	ENE3/4N		NEbE1/4E	
5 1/2	61° 52′ 30″	N 62° E	NEbE1/2E	ENE1/2N		NEbE1/2E	
5 3/4	64° 41′ 15″	N 65° E	NEbE3/4E	ENE1/4N		NEbE3/4E	
6	67° 30′ 0″	N 68° E	ENE				
6 1/4	70° 18′ 45″	N 70° E	ENE1/4E	EbN3/4N	ENE1/4E		EbN3/4N
6 1/2	73° 7′ 30″	N 73° E	ENE1/2E	EbN1/2N	ENE1/2E		EbN1/2N
6 3/4	75° 56′ 15″	N 76° E	ENE3/4E	EbN1/4N	ENE3/4E		EbN1/4N
7	78° 45′ 0″	N 79° E	EbN				
7 1/4	81° 33′ 45″	N 82° E	EbN1/4E	E3/4N			
7 1/2	84° 22′ 30″	N 84° E	EbN1/2E	E1/2N			
7 3/4	87° 11′ 15″	N 87° E	EbN3/4E	E1/4N			
8	90° 0′ 0″	E	E				
8 1/4	92° 48′ 45″	S 87° E	E1/4S	EbS3/4E	E1/4S		
8 1/2	95° 37′ 30″	S 84° E	E1/2S	EbS1/2E	E1/2S		
8 3/4	98° 26′ 15″	S 82° E	E3/4S	EbS1/4E	E3/4S		
9	101° 15′ 0″	S 79° E	EbS				
9 1/4	104° 3′ 45″	S 76° E	EbS1/4S	ESE3/4E			EbS1/4S
9 1/2	106° 52′ 30″	S 73° E	EbS1/2S	ESE1/2E			EbS1/2S
9 3/4	109° 41′ 15″	S 70° E	EbS3/4S	ESE1/4E			EbS3/4S
10	112° 30′ 0″	S 68° E	ESE				
10 1/4	115° 18′ 45″	S 65° E	ESE1/4S	SEbE3/4E	ESE1/4S	SEbE3/4E	
10 1/2	118° 7′ 30″	S 62° E	ESE1/2S	SEbE1/2E	ESE1/2S	SEbE1/2E	
10 3/4	120° 56′ 15″	S 59° E	ESE3/4S	SEbE1/4E	ESE3/4S	SEbE1/4E	
11	123° 45′ 0″	S 56° E	SEbE				
11 1/4	126° 33′ 45″	S 53° E	SEbE1/4S	SE3/4E			
11 1/2	129° 22′ 30″	S 51° E	SEbE1/2S	SE1/2E			
11 3/4	132° 11′ 15″	S 48° E	SEbE3/4S	SE1/4E			
12	135° 0′ 0″	S 45° E	SE				
12 1/4	137° 48′ 45″	S 42° E	SE1/4S	SEbS3/4E	SE1/4S		
12 1/2	140° 37′ 30″	S 39° E	SE1/2S	SEbS1/2E	SE1/2S		
12 3/4	143° 26′ 15″	S 37° E	SE3/4S	SEbS1/4E	SE3/4S		
13	146° 15′ 0″	S 34° E	SEbS				
13 1/4	149° 3′ 45″	S 31° E	SEbS1/4S	SSE3/4E			
13 1/2	151° 52′ 30″	S 28° E	SEbS1/2S	SSE1/2E			
13 3/4	154° 41′ 15″	S 25° E	SEbS3/4S	SSE1/4E			
14	157° 30′ 0″	S 23° E	SSE				
14 1/4	160° 18′ 45″	S 20° E	SSE1/4S	SbE3/4E	SSE1/4S	SbE3/4E	
14 1/2	163° 7′ 30″	S 17° E	SSE1/2S	SbE1/2E	SSE1/2S	SbE1/2E	
14 3/4	165° 56′ 15″	S 14° E	SSE3/4S	SbE1/4E	SSE3/4S	SbE1/4E	
15	168° 45′ 0″	S 11° E	SbE				
15 1/4	171° 33′ 45″	S 8° E	SbE1/4S	S3/4E			
15 1/2	174° 22′ 30″	S 6° E	SbE1/2S	S1/2E			
15 3/4	177° 11′ 15″	S 3° E	SbE3/4S	S1/4E			
16	180° 0′ 0″	S	S				
16 1/4	182° 48′ 45″	S 3° W	S1/4W	SbW3/4S	S1/4W		
16 1/2	185° 37′ 30″	S 6° W	S1/2W	SbW1/2S	S1/2W		
16 3/4	188° 26′ 15″	S 8° W	S3/4W	SbW1/4S	S3/4W		
17	191° 15′ 0″	S 11° W	SbW				
17 1/4	194° 3′ 45″	S 14° W	SbW1/4W	SSW3/4S		SbW1/4W	
17 1/2	196° 52′ 30″	S 17° W	SbW1/2W	SSW1/2S		SbW1/2W	
17 3/4	199° 41′ 15″	S 20° W	SbW3/4W	SSW1/4S		SbW3/4W	
18	202° 30′ 0″	S 23° W	SSW				
18 1/4	205° 18′ 45″	S 25° W	SSW1/4W	SWbS3/4S	SSW1/4W		
18 1/2	208° 7′ 30″	S 28° W	SSW1/2W	SWbS1/2S	SSW1/2W		
18 3/4	210° 56′ 15″	S 31° W	SSW3/4W	SWbS1/4S	SSW3/4W		
19	213° 45′ 0″	S 34° W	SWbS				
19 1/4	216° 33′ 45″	S 37° W	SWbS1/4W	SW3/4S			
19 1/2	219° 22′ 30″	S 39° W	SWbS1/2W	SW1/2S			
19 3/4	222° 11′ 15″	S 42° W	SWbS3/4W	SW1/4S			
20	225° 0′ 0″	S 45° W	SW				
20 1/4	227° 48′ 45″	S 48° W	SW1/4W	SWbW3/4S	SW1/4W		
20 1/2	230° 37′ 30″	S 51° W	SW1/2W	SWbW1/2S	SW1/2W		
20 3/4	233° 26′ 15″	S 53° W	SW3/4W	SWbW1/4S	SW3/4W		
21	236° 15′ 0″	S 56° W	SWbW				
21 1/4	239° 3′ 45″	S 59° W	SWbW1/4W	WSW3/4S		SWbW1/4W	
21 1/2	241° 52′ 30″	S 62° W	SWbW1/2W	WSW1/2S		SWbW1/2W	
21 3/4	244° 41′ 15″	S 65° W	SWbW3/4W	WSW1/4S		SWbW3/4W	
22	247° 30′ 0″	S 68° W	WSW				
22 1/4	250° 18′ 45″	S 70° W	WSW1/4W	WbS3/4S	WSW1/4W		WbS3/4S
22 1/2	253° 7′ 30″	S 73° W	WSW1/2W	WbS1/2S	WSW1/2W		WbS1/2S
22 3/4	255° 56′ 15″	S 76° W	WSW3/4W	WbS1/4S	WSW3/4W		WbS1/4S
23	258° 45′ 0″	S 79° W	WbS				
23 1/4	261° 33′ 45″	S 82° W	WbS1/4W	W3/4S			
23 1/2	264° 22′ 30″	S 84° W	WbS1/2W	W1/2S			
23 3/4	267° 11′ 15″	S 87° W	WbS3/4W	W1/4S			
24	270° 0′ 0″	W	W				
24 1/4	272° 48′ 45″	N 87° W	W1/4N	WbN3/4W	W1/4N		
24 1/2	275° 37′ 30″	N 84° W	W1/2N	WbN1/2W	W1/2N		
24 3/4	278° 26′ 15″	N 82° W	W3/4N	WbN1/4W	W3/4N		
25	281° 15′ 0″	N 79° W	WbN				
25 1/4	284° 3′ 45″	N 76° W	WbN1/4N	WNW3/4W			WbN1/4N
25 1/2	286° 52′ 30″	N 73° W	WbN1/2N	WNW1/2W			WbN1/2N
25 3/4	289° 41′ 15″	N 70° W	WbN3/4N	WNW1/4W			WbN3/4N
26	292° 30′ 0″	N 68° W	WNW				
26 1/4	295° 18′ 45″	N 65° W	WNW1/4N	NWbW3/4W	WNW1/4N	NWbW3/4W	
26 1/2	298° 7′ 30″	N 62° W	WNW1/2N	NWbW1/2W	WNW1/2N	NWbW1/2W	
26 3/4	300° 56′ 15″	N 59° W	WNW3/4N	NWbW1/4W	WNW3/4N	NWbW1/4W	
27	303° 45′ 0″	N 56° W	NWbW				
27 1/4	306° 33′ 45″	N 53° W	NWbW1/4N	NW3/4W			
27 1/2	309° 22′ 30″	N 51° W	NWbW1/2N	NW1/2W			
27 3/4	312° 11′ 15″	N 48° W	NWbW3/4N	NW1/4W			
28	315° 0′ 0″	N 45° W	NW				
28 1/4	317° 48′ 45″	N 42° W	NW1/4N	NWbN3/4W	NW1/4N		
28 1/2	320° 37′ 30″	N 39° W	NW1/2N	NWbN1/2W	NW1/2N		
28 3/4	323° 26′ 15″	N 37° W	NW3/4N	NWbN1/4W	NW3/4N		
29	326° 15′ 0″	N 34° W	NWbN				
29 1/4	329° 3′ 45″	N 31° W	NWbN1/4N	NNW3/4W			
29 1/2	331° 52′ 30″	N 28° W	NWbN1/2N	NNW1/2W			
29 3/4	334° 41′ 15″	N 25° W	NWbN3/4N	NNW1/4W			
30	337° 30′ 0″	N 23° W	NNW				
30 1/4	340° 18′ 45″	N 20° W	NNW1/4N	NbW3/4W	NNW1/4N	NbW3/4W	
30 1/2	343° 7′ 30″	N 17° W	NNW1/2N	NbW1/2W	NNW1/2N	NbW1/2W	
30 3/4	345° 56′ 15″	N 14° W	NNW3/4N	NbW1/4W	NNW3/4N	NbW1/4W	
31	348° 45′ 0″	N 11° W	NbW				
31 1/4	351° 33′ 45″	N 8° W	NbW1/4N	N3/4W			
31 1/2	354° 22′ 30″	N 6° W	NbW1/2N	N1/2W			
31 3/4	357° 11′ 15″	N 3° W	NbW3/4N	N1/4W			
32	360° 0′ 0″	N	N				

== Traditional Mediterranean compass points ==
The traditional compass rose of eight winds (and its 16-wind and 32-wind derivatives) was invented by seafarers in the Mediterranean Sea during the Middle Ages (with no obvious connection to the twelve classical compass winds of the ancient Greeks and Romans). The traditional mariner's wind names were expressed in Italian, or more precisely, the Italianate Mediterranean lingua franca common among sailors in the 13th and 14th centuries, which was principally composed of Genoese (Ligurian), mixed with Venetian, Sicilian, Provençal, Catalan, Greek, and Arabic terms, all from languages spoken around the Mediterranean basin.

32-wind compass with traditional names (and traditional colour code)

This Italianate patois was used to designate the names of the principal winds on the compass rose found in mariners' compasses and portolan charts of the 14th and 15th centuries. The traditional names of the eight principal winds are:

- (N) – Tramontana
- (NE) – Greco (or Bora in some Venetian sources)
- (E) – Levante (sometimes Oriente)
- (SE) – Scirocco (or Exaloc in Catalan)
- (S) – Ostro (or Mezzogiorno in Venetian)
- (SW) – Libeccio (or Garbino, Eissalot in Provençal)
- (W) – Ponente (or Zephyrus in Greek)
- (NW) – Maestro (or Mistral in Provençal)

Local spelling variations are far more numerous than listed (e.g. Tramutana). Traditional compass roses will typically have the initials T, G, L, S, O, L, P, and M on the 8 main points.

Portolan charts also colour-coded the compass winds: black for the eight principal winds, green for the eight half-winds, and red for the sixteen quarter-winds.

Each half-wind name is simply a combination of the two principal winds that it bisects, with the shortest name usually placed first, for example: NNE is "Greco-Tramontana"; ENE is "Greco-Levante"; SSE is "Ostro-Scirocco", etc. The quarter winds are expressed with an Italian phrase, "Quarto di X verso Y" (pronounced [ˈkwarto di X ˈvɛrso Y] one quarter from X towards Y), or "X al Y" (X to Y) or "X per Y" (X by Y). There are no irregularities to trip over; the closest principal wind always comes first, the more distant one second, for example: north-by-east is "Quarto di Tramontana verso Greco"; and northeast-by-north is "Quarto di Greco verso Tramontana".

The table below shows how the 32 compass points are named. Each point has an angular range of 11 1/4 degrees where the azimuth midpoint is the horizontal angular direction (clockwise from north) of the given compass bearing; minimum is the lower (counterclockwise) angular limit of the compass point; and maximum is the upper (clockwise) angular limit of the compass point.

Naming of points on traditional Mediterranean compass
No.	Compass point	Abbreviation	Traditional wind point	Azimuth		
No.	Compass point	Abbreviation	Traditional wind point	Minimum	Midpoint	Maximum
0	North	N	Tramontana	354 3/8°	0°	5 5/8°
1	North by east	NbE	Quarto di Tramontana verso Greco	5 5/8°	11 1/4°	16 7/8°
2	North-northeast	NNE	Greco-Tramontana	16 7/8°	22 1/2°	28 1/8°
3	Northeast by north	NEbN	Quarto di Greco verso Tramontana	28 1/8°	33 3/4°	39 3/8°
4	Northeast	NE	Greco	39 3/8°	45°	50 5/8°
5	Northeast by east	NEbE	Quarto di Greco verso Levante	50 5/8°	56 1/4°	61 7/8°
6	East-northeast	ENE	Greco-Levante	61 7/8°	67 1/2°	73 1/8°
7	East by north	EbN	Quarto di Levante verso Greco	73 1/8°	78 3/4°	84 3/8°
8	East	E	Levante	84 3/8°	90°	95 5/8°
9	East by south	EbS	Quarto di Levante verso Scirocco	95 5/8°	101 1/4°	106 7/8°
10	East-southeast	ESE	Levante-Scirocco	106 7/8°	112 1/2°	118 1/8°
11	Southeast by east	SEbE	Quarto di Scirocco verso Levante	118 1/8°	123 3/4°	129 3/8°
12	Southeast	SE	Scirocco	129 3/8°	135°	140 5/8°
13	Southeast by south	SEbS	Quarto di Scirocco verso Ostro	140 5/8°	146 1/4°	151 7/8°
14	South-southeast	SSE	Ostro-Scirocco	151 7/8°	157 1/2°	163 1/8°
15	South by east	SbE	Quarto di Ostro verso Scirocco	163 1/8°	168 3/4°	174 3/8°
16	South	S	Ostro	174 3/8°	180°	185 5/8°
17	South by west	SbW	Quarto di Ostro verso Libeccio	185 5/8°	191 1/4°	196 7/8°
18	South-southwest	SSW	Ostro-Libeccio	196 7/8°	202 1/2°	208 1/8°
19	Southwest by south	SWbS	Quarto di Libeccio verso Ostro	208 1/8°	213 3/4°	219 3/8°
20	Southwest	SW	Libeccio	219 3/8°	225°	230 5/8°
21	Southwest by west	SWbW	Quarto di Libeccio verso Ponente	230 5/8°	236 1/4°	241 7/8°
22	West-southwest	WSW	Ponente-Libeccio	241 7/8°	247 1/2°	253 1/8°
23	West by south	WbS	Quarto di Ponente verso Libeccio	253 1/8°	258 3/4°	264 3/8°
24	West	W	Ponente	264 3/8°	270°	275 5/8°
25	West by north	WbN	Quarto di Ponente verso Maestro	275 5/8°	281 1/4°	286 7/8°
26	West-northwest	WNW	Maestro-Ponente	286 7/8°	292 1/2°	298 1/8°
27	Northwest by west	NWbW	Quarto di Maestro verso Ponente	298 1/8°	303 3/4°	309 3/8°
28	Northwest	NW	Maestro	309 3/8°	315°	320 5/8°
29	Northwest by north	NWbN	Quarto di Maestro verso Tramontana	320 5/8°	326 1/4°	331 7/8°
30	North-northwest	NNW	Maestro-Tramontana	331 7/8°	337 1/2°	343 1/8°
31	North by west	NbW	Quarto di Tramontana verso Maestro	343 1/8°	348 3/4°	354 3/8°
32	North	N	Tramontana	354 3/8°	360°	5 5/8°

== Chinese compass points ==
Navigation texts dating from the Yuan, Ming, and Qing dynasties in China use a 24-pointed compass with named directions. These are based on the twelve Earthly Branches, which also form the basis of the Chinese zodiac. When a single direction is specified, it may be prefaced by the character 單 (meaning single) or 丹.

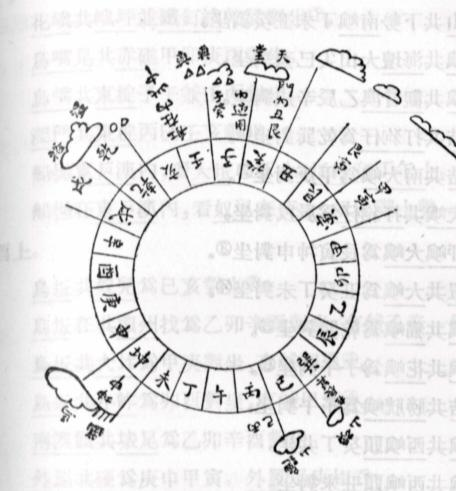
Ming dynasty 24-pointed compass

Headings mid-way in-between are compounds as in English. For instance, 癸子 refers to the direction halfway between point 子 and point 癸, or 7 1/2°. This technique is referred to as a double-needle (雙針) compass.

Point	Ordinal Name	Angle
子 zǐ	north	0° or 360°
癸 guǐ		15°
丑 chǒu		30°
艮 gěn	northeast	45°
寅 yín		60°
甲 jiǎ		75°
卯 mǎo	east	90°
乙 yǐ		105°
辰 chén		120°
巽 xùn	southeast	135°
巳 sì		150°
丙 bǐng		165°
午 wǔ	south	180°
丁 dīng		195°
未 wèi		210°
坤 kūn	southwest	225°
申 shēn		240°
庚 gēng		255°
酉 yǒu	west	270°
辛 xīn		285°
戌 xū		300°
乾 qián	northwest	315°
亥 hài		330°
壬 rén		345°

== See also ==
- Bearing (navigation)
- Cardinal direction
- Course (navigation)
- Heading (navigation)
- TVMDC
- Wind rose
