= Compass rose =

Figure on a compass, map, nautical chart

A common compass rose as found on a nautical chart showing both true north (using a nautical star symbol) and magnetic north with magnetic variation. Also notice the correspondence between the 32-point rose (inner circle) and the modern 0–360° graduations.

Compass rose with the eight principal winds.

A compass rose or compass star, sometimes called a wind rose or rose of the winds, is a polar diagram displaying the orientation of the cardinal directions (north, east, south, and west) and their intermediate points. It is used on compasses (including magnetic ones), maps (such as compass rose networks), or monuments. It is particularly common in navigation systems, including nautical charts, non-directional beacons (NDB), VHF omnidirectional range (VOR) systems, satellite navigation devices ("GPS").

== Types ==
Linguistic anthropological studies have shown that most human communities have four points of cardinal direction. The names given to these directions are usually derived from either locally-specific geographic features (e.g. "towards the hills", "towards the sea") or from celestial bodies (especially the sun) or from atmospheric features (winds, temperature). Most mobile populations tend to adopt sunrise and sunset for East and West and the direction from where different winds blow to denote North and South.

=== Classical ===
The ancient Greeks originally maintained distinct and separate systems of points and winds. The four Greek cardinal points (arctos, anatole, mesembria and dusis) were based on celestial bodies and used for orientation. The four Greek winds (Boreas, Notos, Eurus, Zephyrus) were confined to meteorology. Nonetheless, both systems were gradually conflated, and wind names came eventually to denote cardinal directions as well.

In his meteorological studies, Aristotle identified ten distinct winds: two north–south winds (Aparctias, Notos) and four sets of east–west winds blowing from different latitudes—the Arctic Circle (Meses, Thrascias), the summer solstice horizon (Caecias, Argestes), the equinox (Apeliotes, Zephyrus) and the winter solstice (Eurus, Lips). Aristotle's system was asymmetric. To restore balance, Timosthenes of Rhodes added two more winds to produce the classical 12-wind rose, and began using the winds to denote geographical direction in navigation. Eratosthenes deducted two winds from Aristotle's system, to produce the classical eight-wind rose.

The Romans (e.g. Seneca, Pliny) adopted the Greek 12-wind system, and replaced its names with Latin equivalents, e.g. Septentrio, Subsolanus, Auster, Favonius, etc. The De architectura of the Roman architect Vitruvius describes 24 winds.

Classical 12-wind rose, with Greek (blue) and Latin (red) names (from Seneca)

According to the chronicler Einhard (c. 830), the Frankish king Charlemagne himself came up with his own names for the classical 12 winds. During the Migration Period, the Germanic names for the cardinal directions entered the Romance languages, where they replaced the Latin names borealis with north, australis with south, occidentalis with west and orientalis with east.

The following table gives a rough equivalence of the classical 12-wind rose with the modern compass directions (The directions are imprecise since it is not clear at what angles the classical winds are supposed to be with each other; some have argued that they should be equally spaced at 30 degrees each; for more details, see the article on Classical compass winds).

Wind	Greek	Roman	Frankish
N	Aparctias (ἀπαρκτίας) or Boreas (βoρέας)	Septentrio	Nordroni
NNE	Meses (μέσης)	Aquilo	Nordostroni
NE	Caicias (καικίας)	Caecias	Ostnordroni
E	Apeliotes (ἀπηλιώτης)	Subsolanus	Ostroni
SE	Eurus (εὖρος)	Vulturnus	Ostsundroni
SSE	Euronotus (εὐρόνοτος)	Euronotus	Sundostroni
S	Notos (νότος)	Auster	Sundroni
SSW	Libonotos (λιβόνοτος)	Libonotus or Austroafricus	Sundvuestroni
SW	Lips (λίψ)	Africus	Vuestsundroni
W	Zephyrus (ζέφυρος)	Favonius	Vuestroni
NW	Argestes (ἀργέστης)	Corus	Vuestnordroni
NNW	Thrascias (θρασκίας)	Thrascias or Circius	Nordvuestroni

=== Sidereal ===
The sidereal compass rose demarcates the compass points by the position of stars ("steering stars"; not to be confused with zenith stars) in the night sky, rather than winds. Arab navigators in the Red Sea and the Indian Ocean, who depended on celestial navigation, were using a 32-point sidereal compass rose before the end of the 10th century. In the Northern Hemisphere, the steady Pole Star (Polaris) was used for the N–S axis; the less-steady Southern Cross had to do for the Southern Hemisphere, as the southern pole star, Sigma Octantis, is too dim to be easily seen from Earth with the naked eye. The other thirty points on the sidereal rose were determined by the rising and setting positions of fifteen bright stars. Reading from North to South, in their rising and setting positions, these are:

Point	Star
N	Polaris
NbE	"the Guards" (Ursa Minor)
NNE	Alpha Ursa Major
NEbN	Alpha Cassiopeiae
NE	Capella
NEbE	Vega
ENE	Arcturus
EbN	the Pleiades
E	Altair
EbS	Orion's belt
ESE	Sirius
SEbE	Beta Scorpionis
SE	Antares
SEbS	Alpha Centauri
SSE	Canopus
SbE	Achernar
S	Southern Cross

The western half of the rose would be the same stars in their setting position. The true position of these stars is only approximate to their theoretical equidistant rhumbs on the sidereal compass. Stars with the same declination formed a "linear constellation" or kavenga to provide direction as the night progressed.

A similar sidereal compass was used by Polynesian and Micronesian navigators in the Pacific Ocean, although different stars were used in a number of cases, clustering around the east–west axis.

=== Mariner's ===
In Europe, the Classical 12-wind system continued to be taught in academic settings during the Medieval era, but seafarers in the Mediterranean came up with their own distinct 8-wind system. The mariners used names derived from the Mediterranean lingua franca, composed principally of Ligurian, mixed with Venetian, Sicilian, Provençal, Catalan, Greek and Arabic terms from around the Mediterranean basin.

32-wind compass with traditional names (and traditional color code)

- (N) Tramontana
- (NE) Greco (or Bora)
- (E) Levante
- (SE) Scirocco (or Exaloc)
- (S) Ostro (or Mezzogiorno)
- (SW) Libeccio (or Garbino)
- (W) Ponente
- (NW) Maestro (or Mistral)

The exact origin of the mariner's eight-wind rose is obscure. Only two of its point names (Ostro, Libeccio) have Classical etymologies, the rest of the names seem to be autonomously derived. Two Arabic words stand out: Scirocco (SE) from al-Sharq (الشرق – east in Arabic) and the variant Garbino (SW), from al-Gharb (الغرب – west in Arabic). This suggests the mariner's rose was probably acquired by southern Italian seafarers; not from their classical Roman ancestors, but rather from Norman Sicily in the 11th to 12th centuries. The coasts of the Maghreb and Mashriq are SW and SE of Sicily respectively; the Greco (a NE wind), reflects the position of Byzantine-held Calabria-Apulia to the northeast of Arab Sicily, while the Maestro (a NW wind) is a reference to the Mistral wind that blows from the southern French coast towards northwest Sicily.

The 32-point compass used for navigation in the Mediterranean by the 14th century, had increments of 11 1/4° between points. Only the eight principal winds (N, NE, E, SE, S, SW, W, NW) were given special names. The eight half-winds just combined the names of the two principal winds, e.g. Greco-Tramontana for NNE, Greco-Levante for ENE, and so on. Quarter-winds were more cumbersomely phrased, with the closest principal wind named first and the next-closest principal wind second, e.g. "Quarto di Tramontana verso Greco" (literally, "one quarter wind from North towards Northeast", i.e. North by East), and "Quarto di Greco verso Tramontana" ("one quarter wind from NE towards N", i.e. Northeast by North). Boxing the compass (naming all 32 winds) was expected of all Medieval mariners.

== Depiction on nautical charts ==
In the earliest medieval portolan charts of the 14th century, compass roses were depicted as mere collections of color-coded compass rhumb lines: black for the eight main winds, green for the eight half-winds and red for the sixteen quarter-winds. The average portolan chart had sixteen such roses (or confluence of lines), spaced out equally around the circumference of a large implicit circle.

The cartographer Cresques Abraham of Mallorca, in his Catalan Atlas of 1375, was the first to draw an ornate compass rose on a map. By the end of the 15th century, Portuguese cartographers began drawing multiple ornate compass roses throughout the chart, one upon each of the sixteen circumference roses (unless the illustration conflicted with coastal details).

The points on a compass rose were frequently labeled by the initial letters of the mariner's principal winds (T, G, L, S, O, L, P, M). From the outset, the custom also began to distinguish the north from the other points by a specific visual marker. Medieval Italian cartographers typically used a simple arrowhead or circumflex-hatted T (an allusion to the compass needle) to designate the north, while the Majorcan cartographic school typically used a stylized Pole Star for its north mark. The use of the fleur-de-lis as north mark was introduced by Pedro Reinel, and quickly became customary in compass roses (and is still often used today). Old compass roses also often used a Christian cross at Levante (E), indicating the direction of Jerusalem from the point of view of the Mediterranean sea.

The twelve Classical winds (or a subset of them) were also sometimes depicted on portolan charts, albeit not on a compass rose, but rather separately on small disks or coins on the edges of the map.

The compass rose was also depicted on traverse boards used on board ships to record headings sailed at set time intervals.

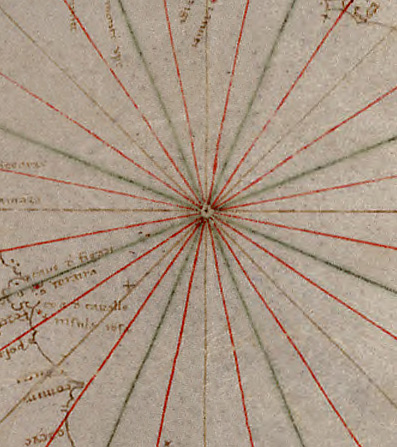
Early 32-wind compass rose, shown as a mere collection of color-coded rhumblines, from a Genoese nautical chart (c. 1325)

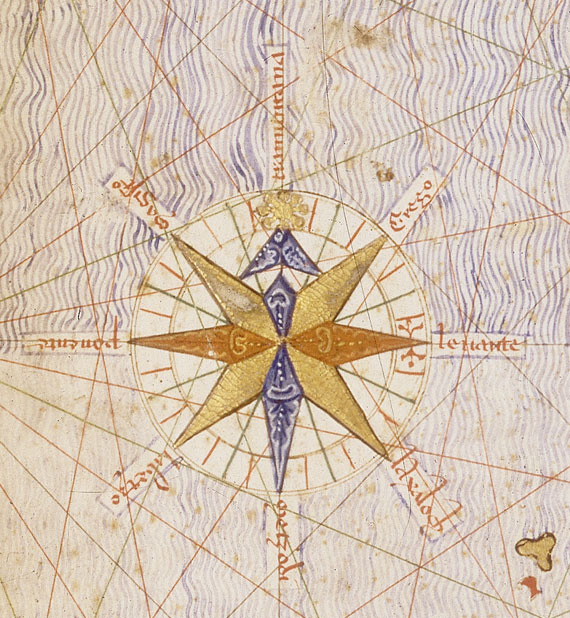
First ornate compass rose depicted on a chart, from the Catalan Atlas (1375), with the Pole Star as north mark

More ornate compass rose, with letters of traditional winds, a cross pattée (referring to Jerusalem) for east, and a compass needle as north mark, from a nautical chart by Jorge de Aguiar (1492)

Highly ornate compass rose, with fleur-de-lis as north mark and cross pattée as east mark, from the Cantino planisphere (1502)

== Modern depictions ==
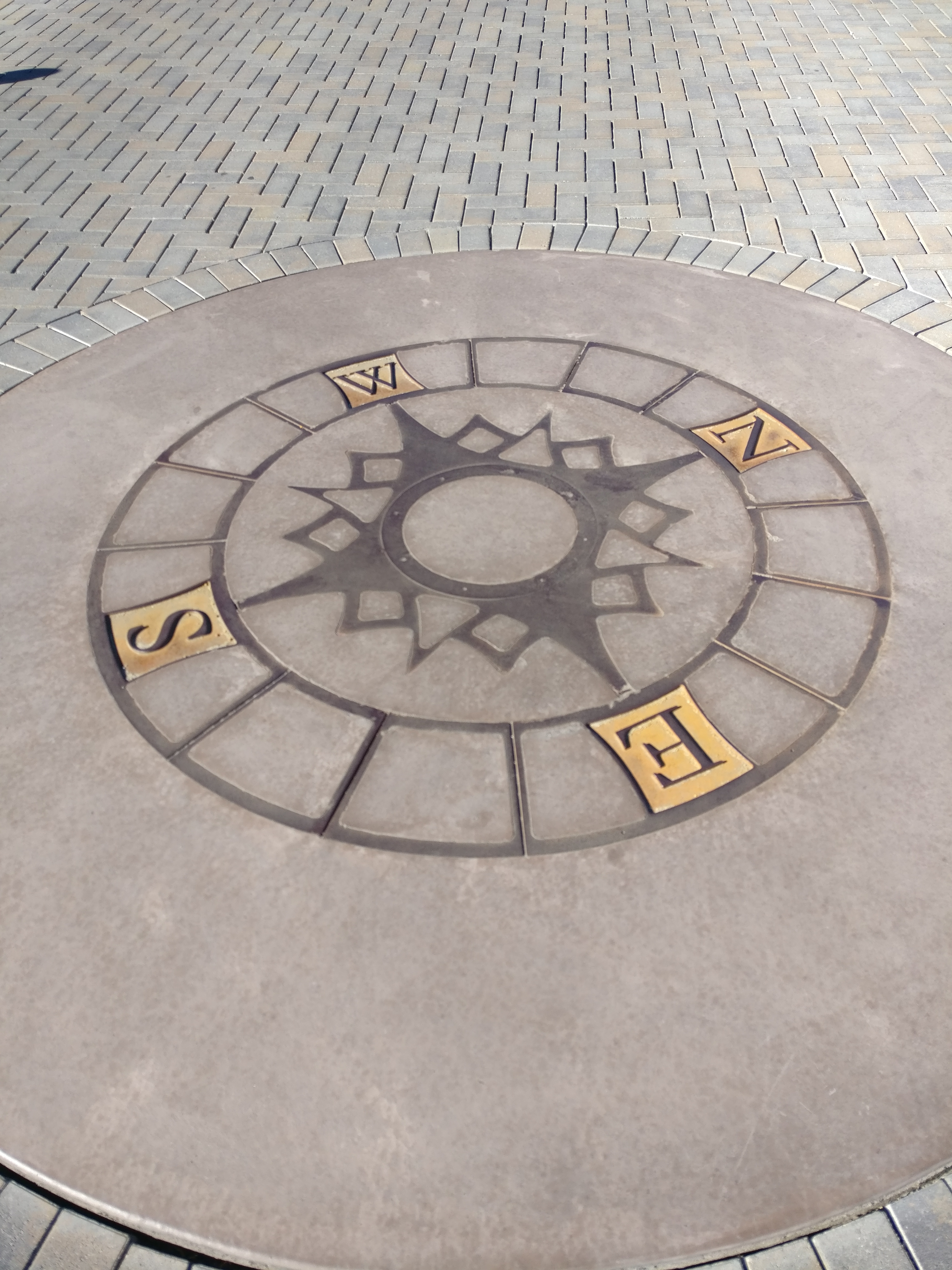
A 16-point compass rose on the grounds of a library serves both as a pedagogical device and public art.

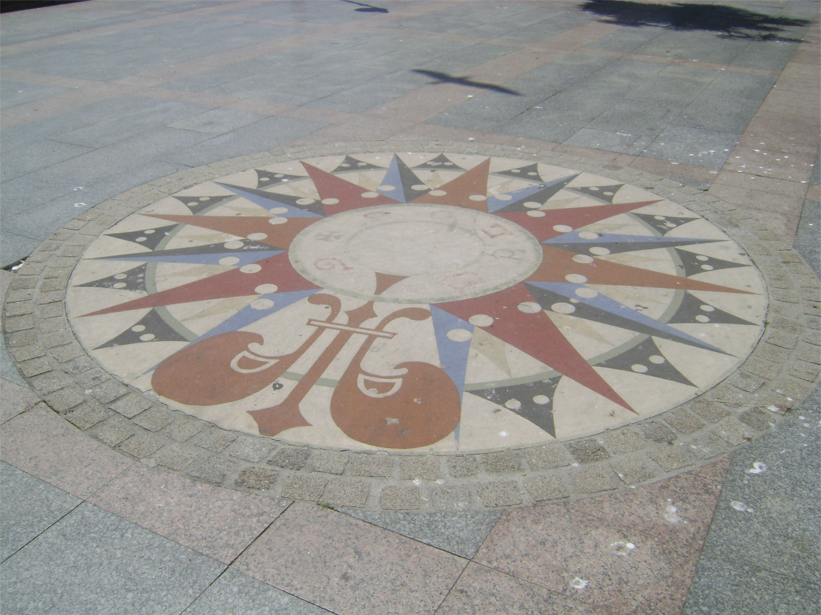
Compass Rose in Galicia, Spain

The contemporary compass rose appears as two rings, one smaller and set inside the other. The outside ring denotes true cardinal directions while the smaller inside ring denotes magnetic cardinal directions. True north refers to the geographical location of the North Pole while magnetic north refers to the direction towards which the north pole of a magnetic object (as found in a compass) will point. The angular difference between true and magnetic north is called variation, which varies depending on location. The angular difference between magnetic heading and compass heading is called deviation which varies by vessel and its heading. North arrows are often included in contemporary maps as part of the map layout. The modern compass rose has eight principal winds. Listed clockwise, these are:

Compass point	Abbr.	Heading	Traditional wind
North	N	0°	Tramontana
North-east	NE	45° (45°×1)	Greco or Grecale
East	E	90° (45°×2)	Levante
South-east	SE	135° (45°×3)	Scirocco
South	S	180° (45°×4)	Ostro or Mezzogiorno
South-west	SW	225° (45°×5)	Libeccio or Garbino
West	W	270° (45°×6)	Ponente
North-west	NW	315° (45°×7)	Maestro, Maestrale or Mistral

Although modern compasses use the names of the eight principal directions (N, NE, E, SE, etc.), older compasses use the traditional Italianate wind names of medieval origin (Tramontana, Greco, Levante, etc.).

Four-point compass roses use only the four "basic winds" or "cardinal directions" (North, East, South, West), with angles of difference at 90°.

Eight-point compass roses use the eight principal winds—that is, the four cardinal directions (N, E, S, W) plus the four "intercardinal" or "ordinal directions" (NE, SE, SW, NW), at angles of difference of 45°.

Twelve-point compass roses, with markings 30° apart, are often painted on airport ramps to assist with the adjustment of aircraft magnetic compass compensators.

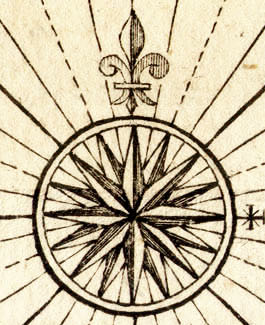
16-point compass rose from 1753 Dutch map

Sixteen-point compass roses are constructed by bisecting the angles of the principal winds to come up with intermediate compass points, known as half-winds, at angles of difference of 22 1/2°. The names of the half-winds are simply combinations of the principal winds to either side, principal then ordinal. E.g. North-northeast (NNE), East-northeast (ENE), etc. Using gradians, of which there are 400 in a circle, the sixteen-point rose has twenty-five gradians per point.

Thirty-two-point compass roses are constructed by bisecting these angles, and coming up with quarter-winds at 11 1/4° angles of difference. Quarter-wind names are constructed with the names "X by Y", which can be read as "one quarter wind from X toward Y", where X is one of the eight principal winds and Y is one of the two adjacent cardinal directions. For example, North-by-east (NbE) is one quarter wind from North towards East, Northeast-by-north (NEbN) is one quarter wind from Northeast toward North. Naming all 32 points on the rose is called "boxing the compass".

The 32-point rose has 11 1/4° between points, but is easily found by halving divisions and may have been easier for those not using a 360° circle. Eight points make a right angle and a point is easy to estimate allowing bearings to be given such as "two points off the starboard bow".

A 4-point compass rose

An 8-point compass rose

A 16-point compass rose

A 32-point compass rose

A 360 degree and 6400 NATO mil compass rose

== Use as symbol ==
- The NATO symbol uses a four-pointed rose.
- Outward Bound uses the compass rose as the logo for various schools around the world.
- An 8-point compass rose was the logo of Varig, the largest airline in Brazil for many decades until its bankruptcy in 2006.
- An 8-point compass rose is a prominent feature in the logo of the Seattle Mariners Major League Baseball club.
- Hong Kong Correctional Services's crest uses a four-pointed compass rose.
- The compass rose is used as the symbol of the worldwide Anglican Communion of churches.
- A 16-point compass rose was IBM's logo for the System/360 product line.
- A 16-point compass rose is the official logo of the Spanish National University of Distance Education (Universidad Nacional de Educación a Distancia or UNED).
- A 16-point compass rose is present on the seal and the flag of the Central Intelligence Agency of the federal government of the United States (the CIA).
- Tattoos of eight-pointed stars are used by the Vor v Zakone to denote rank.
- The rationality-focused community blog LessWrong uses a compass rose as its logo.

== In popular culture ==
- The Compass Rose is a 1982 collection of short stories by Ursula K. Le Guin.

== See also ==
- Nautical star
- Pelorus (instrument)
- Points of the compass
- Rhumbline network
- Wind rose
