= Lodos =

South-westerly wind in the Aegean and Marmara Sea

The winds of the Mediterranean

The lodos is the strong south-westerly wind which may predominate episodically in the Aegean Sea and Marmara Sea as well as the Mediterranean coast of Turkey all the year round; it frequently raises high seas and may give violent westerly squalls. The word lodos is Turkish, coming from Greek word "Notus", and originally means "southern wind".

== Description ==
The predominant wind-driven surface current of the Aegean Sea is from northwest to southeast, but about twenty times a year the wind shifts southwards, pushing from the Mediterranean towards the Black Sea. If it continues long enough, the surface current also reverses, creating treacherous going for mariners. When Lodos is blowing, the winds in the Turkish Straits begin to shift during the early morning hours. The Black Sea's currents are also affected by Lodos.

They are at their strongest in the afternoon and often die down at night, but sometimes lodos winds last for days without a break. Similar winds blow in the Adriatic and Ionian maritime regions. Lodos winds are dangerous to sailors because they come up in clear weather without warning and can blow at 9-10 Beaufort. Most vessels cannot sail under such conditions.

Lodos brings wind and waves from the south from October to April, with a peak season in December. Along with warm waters from the South, lodos also brings African dust from the Sahara Desert, which contains many minerals such as sulfate, iron, zinc and other minerals that are beneficial to plants.

== Safety ==
During strong lodos winds, especially in December, large vessels are warned against crossing the Bosphorus Strait and at times, the strait is closed to all naval traffic due to lodos shifting charted surface currents. Vessels are most vulnerable to these shifting currents if they lack speed or experience an engine failure. In this case, the only means to halt a vessel would be anchoring, but there is not enough distance at Bosphorus for such a measure, and disaster becomes inevitable.

== See also ==
- List of local winds
- Bora (wind)
- Etesian
- Khamaseen
- Levantades
- Leveche
- Marin (wind)
