= Llevantades =

Winds on the east coast of Spain

Gales from between north-north-east and east-north-east are the most important gales of the east coast of Spain. They are known locally as llevantades (in Catalan) and are an intense form of the llevant or levanter, i.e., north-easterly winds of long fetch, as opposed to diurnal coastal breezes. These gales are most frequent and dangerous in spring and autumn (February to May and October to December), and are generally associated with slow-moving depressions crossing the Mediterranean between France and Algeria.

== See also ==
- Bora (wind)
- Etesian
- Gregale
- Khamaseen
- Leveche
- Libeccio
- Marin (wind)
- Mistral (wind)
- Sirocco
