= Marin Bluff =

Marin Bluff (69°25′00″S 68°36′00″W) is a small rock bluff rising to 425 metres (1,394 ft), 5 nautical miles (9.3 km) east-southeast of Cape Jeremy on the west side of the Antarctic Peninsula. The feature is one of several in the area named after winds. Named by the UK Antarctic Place-names Committee in 1977 after the Marin, a warm south or southeast wind of the Gulf of Lion in France.
