= Grecale =

Grecale may refer to

- Grecale (wind)
- Grecale (ship)—a tugboat originally named Empire Simon
- Italian destroyer Grecale
- Maserati Grecale, a compact luxury crossover SUV
