= Capo Grecale Lighthouse =

Lighthouse in Lampedusa, Italy

Capo Grecale lighthouse
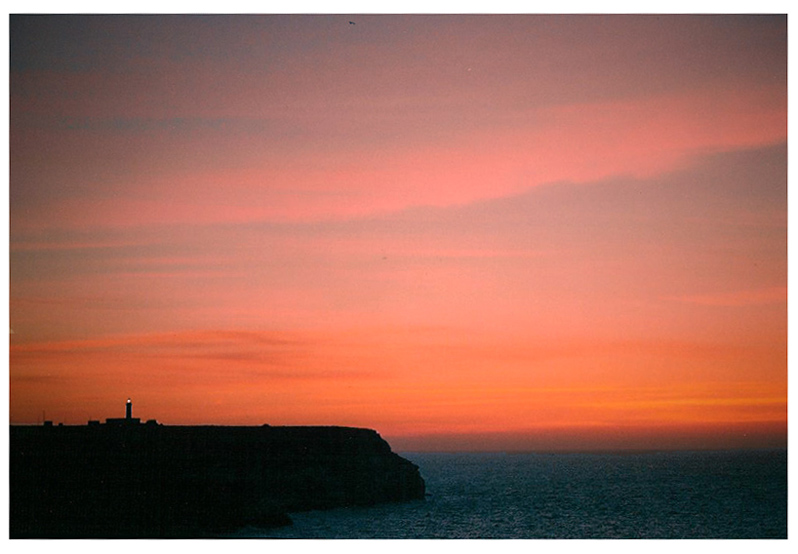
- Location: Lampedusa; Sicily; Italy
- Coordinates: 35°31′04″N 12°37′56″E

Tower
- Constructed: 1855
- Foundation: concrete base
- Construction: concrete tower
- Height: 19 metres (62 ft)
- Shape: octagonal tower with balcony and lantern atop a 1-storey keeper's house
- Markings: unpainted concrete tower, white lantern, grey metallic lantern dome
- Power source: mains electricity
- Operator: Marina Militare
- Fog signal: no

Light
- Focal height: 82 metres (269 ft)
- Lens: Type OR S4
- Intensity: AL 1000 W
- Range: mains: 22 nautical miles (41 km; 25 mi) reserve: 18 nautical miles (33 km; 21 mi)
- Characteristic: Fl W 5s.
- Italy no.: 3038 E.F.

Capo Grecale Lighthouse (Italian: Faro di Capo Grecale) is an active lighthouse located on the northern eastern tip of the island on the edge of a cliff, in the municipality of Lampedusa, Sicily on the Strait of Sicily.

== Description ==
The lighthouse, built in 1855, consists of an octagonal tower, 19 metres (62 ft) high, with balcony and lantern rising from a 1-storey keeper's house on the seaward side. The tower is unpainted concrete and the lantern is white; the lantern dome is grey metallic. The lantern is positioned at 82 metres (269 ft) above sea level and emits one white flash in a 5 seconds period visible up to a distance of 22 nautical miles (41 km; 25 mi). The lighthouse is completely automated and managed by the Marina Militare with the identification code number 3038 E.F.

== See also ==
- List of lighthouses in Italy
