= Etesian =

Strong, dry north winds of the Aegean Sea

The etesians (/ɪˈtiːʒənz/ or /ɪˈtiːziənz/; Ancient Greek: ἐτησίαι, romanized: etēsiai, lit. 'periodic winds'; sometimes found in the Latin form etesiae), meltemia (Greek: μελτέμια; pl. of μελτέμι meltemi), or meltem (Turkish) are the strong, dry north winds of the Aegean Sea, which blow periodically from about mid-May to mid-September. The Etesian winds are a dominant weather influence in the Aegean Basin.

They are at their strongest in the afternoon and often die down at night, but sometimes etesian winds last for days without a break. Similar winds blow in the Adriatic and Ionian regions. Etesian winds are dangerous to sailors because they come up in clear weather without warning and can blow at force 7–8 on the Beaufort scale. Some yachts and most inter-island ferries cannot sail under such conditions. However, they often provide a good, steady sailing wind favored by leisure sailors.

The word etesian ultimately derives from the Greek word ἔτος etos "year", connoting the yearly fluctuation in frequency of appearance of these winds. Etesians have been described since ancient times; their Turkish and Modern Greek names are probably a loan from Italian mal tempo 'bad weather'. Though it is sometimes called a monsoon wind, the meltemi is dry and does not correspond to an opposite wind in the winter. However, the etesians are distantly correlated with the summer monsoons of the Indian subcontinent, as it is a trough of low pressure into the Eastern Mediterranean region that enforces, if not causes, the etesians to blow in summer.

Etesians are due chiefly to the deep continental depression centered over southwest Asia and blow from a direction which may be anywhere between north-east and north-west depending on local topography; etesian winds weather is ordinarily fine and clear, the northerly winds tempering the, at times, fierce summer heat of the region.

In the Northern Aegean sea, the etesians blow as winds of northeasterly to northerly direction. Moving south, in the central Aegean, they blow as winds of northerly direction, while in the southern Aegean, the Cretan and the Carpathian sea, they blow as northwesterlies. The same winds blow in Cyprus as westerlies to southwesterlies, being more humid.

Historically, Philip II of Macedon timed his military operations so that powerful southern fleets could not reach him: their ships could sail north only very slowly while the etesian winds were blowing.

== See also ==
- List of local winds
- Bora (wind)
- Gregale
- Khamaseen
- Llevantades
- Leveche
- Marin (wind)
- Mistral (wind)
- Sirocco
