= Chergui (wind) =

Continental easterly wind in Morocco

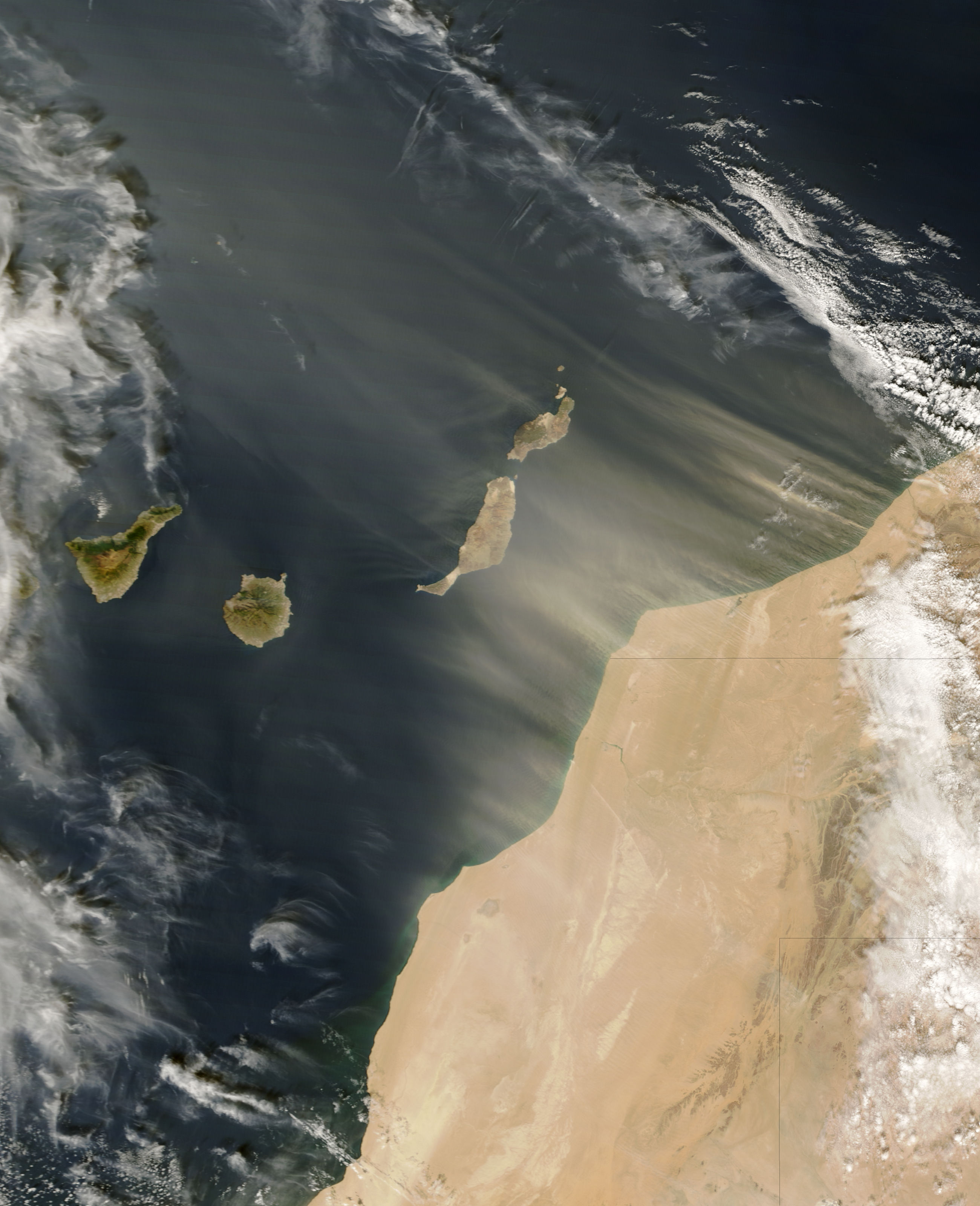
Sand blown from the African continent over the ocean to the Canary Islands

The chergui or sharqī (Arabic: شرقية šarqīa) is the name of a continental easterly or southeasterly wind which blows on Morocco, a hot and dry wind coming from the Sahara Desert. This wind can be compared with the sirocco, a very hot and very dry desert wind. The Arabic word means "coming from the east", as the chergui emanates from the desert east of the Atlas Mountains. This is a rain shadow wind as it falls down after passing over the top of the mountain range as a very hot and dry air into the coastal plains area towards the Atlantic Ocean, which brings soaring temperatures typical of the desert, often over 40 °C (104 °F) and can even turn around 48 °C (118.4 °F) during the day at summertime and the relative humidity is extremely low, nearly always below 15%. The chergui can also more rarely blow at wintertime, and is responsible of a warm, sunny and dry weather.
