= Marin (wind) =

The Marin is a warm, moist wind in the Gulf of Lion of France, blowing from the southeast or south-southeast onto the coast of Languedoc and Roussillon. It brings rain to this region which it has picked up crossing the Mediterranean, and also can bring coastal fog. The clouds carried by the Marin frequently cause rain on the slopes of the mountains in the interior, the Corbières Massif, Montagne Noire, and the Cévennes. The wind is usually dried by the föhn effect when it crosses the mountains and descends on the other side. The Marin wind contributes to the creation of another regional wind, the autan (wind). The Marin blows gently from the offshore coast of the Mediterranean towards the Cévennes and the Montagne Noire. When this occurs it creates fine weather for swimming in the gulf, but when the wind is strong it creates heavy swells which strike the coast with high breaking waves.

The Marin is next in frequency and importance to the mistral, the cold, dry northwest wind in Provence. It is caused by low-pressure systems which enter the Gulf of Lion from the west or southwest after traversing southern France and northern Spain.

== See also ==
- Bora (wind)
- Etesian
- Gregale
- Levant (wind)
- Leveche
- Mistral (wind)
- Sirocco
- Tramontane
- Winds of Provence
