= Ostro =

Southerly wind in the Mediterranean Sea

The winds of the Mediterranean

Ostro (Catalan: Migjorn, Croatian: Oštro, Greek: Όστρια), or Austro, is a southerly wind in the Mediterranean Sea, especially the Adriatic. Its name is Italian, derived from the Latin name Auster, which also meant a southerly wind. It is a warm and humid wind that often carries rain, but it is also sometimes identified with the Libeccio and Sirocco.
