= Mistral (wind) =

Cold northwesterly wind experienced in southern France

The winds of the Mediterranean

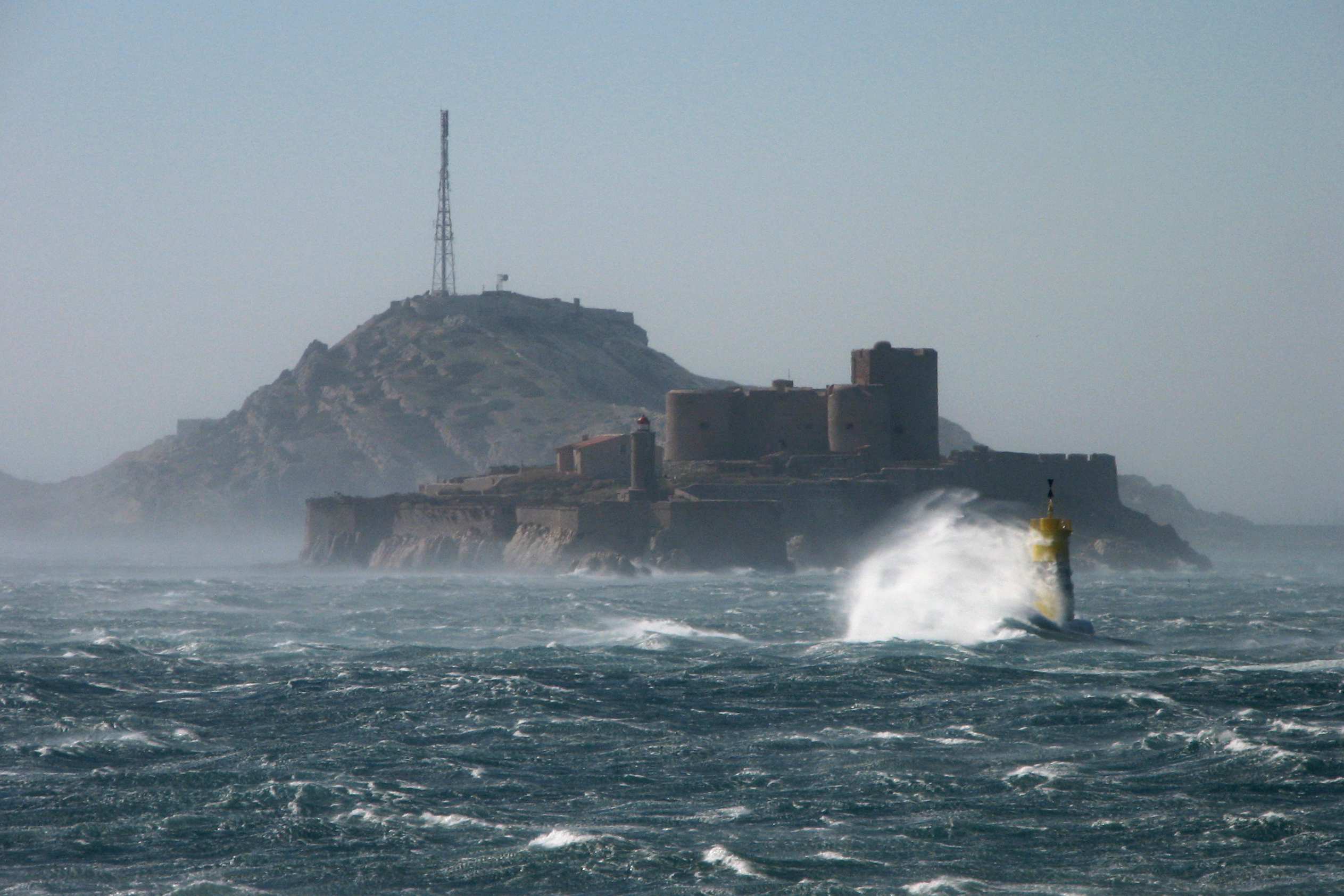
Mistral wind blowing near Marseille. In the centre is the Château d'If.

The mistral (French: [mistʁal]; Catalan: mestral; Corsican: maestrale; Croatian: maestral; Greek: μαΐστρος; Italian: maestrale; Maltese: majjistral) is a strong, cold, northwesterly wind that blows from southern France into the Gulf of Lion in the northern Mediterranean. It produces sustained winds averaging 50 km/h (30 mph), sometimes reaching 100 km/h (60 mph). It can last for several days. Periods of the wind exceeding 30 km/h (19 mph; 8.3 m/s; 16 kn) for more than sixty-five hours have been reported. It is most common in the winter and spring, and strongest in the transition between the two seasons.

It affects the northeast of the plain of Languedoc and Provence to the east of Toulon, where it is felt as a strong west wind. It has a major influence all along the Mediterranean coast of France, and often causes sudden storms in the Mediterranean between Corsica and the Balearic Islands.

The name mistral comes from the Languedoc dialect of the Occitan and means 'masterly'. The same wind is called mistrau in the Provençal variant of Occitan, mestral in Catalan, maestrale in Italian and Corsican, maistràle or bentu maestru in Sardinian, and majjistral in Maltese.

The mistral is usually accompanied by clear, fresh weather, and it plays an important role in creating the climate of Provence. It can reach speeds of more than 90 km/h (56 mph; 25 m/s; 49 kn), particularly in the Rhône Valley. Its average speed during the day can reach about 50 km/h (31 mph; 14 m/s; 27 kn), calming noticeably at night. The mistral usually blows in winter or spring, though it occurs in all seasons. It sometimes lasts only one or two days, frequently lasts several days, and sometimes lasts more than a week.

== Cause ==
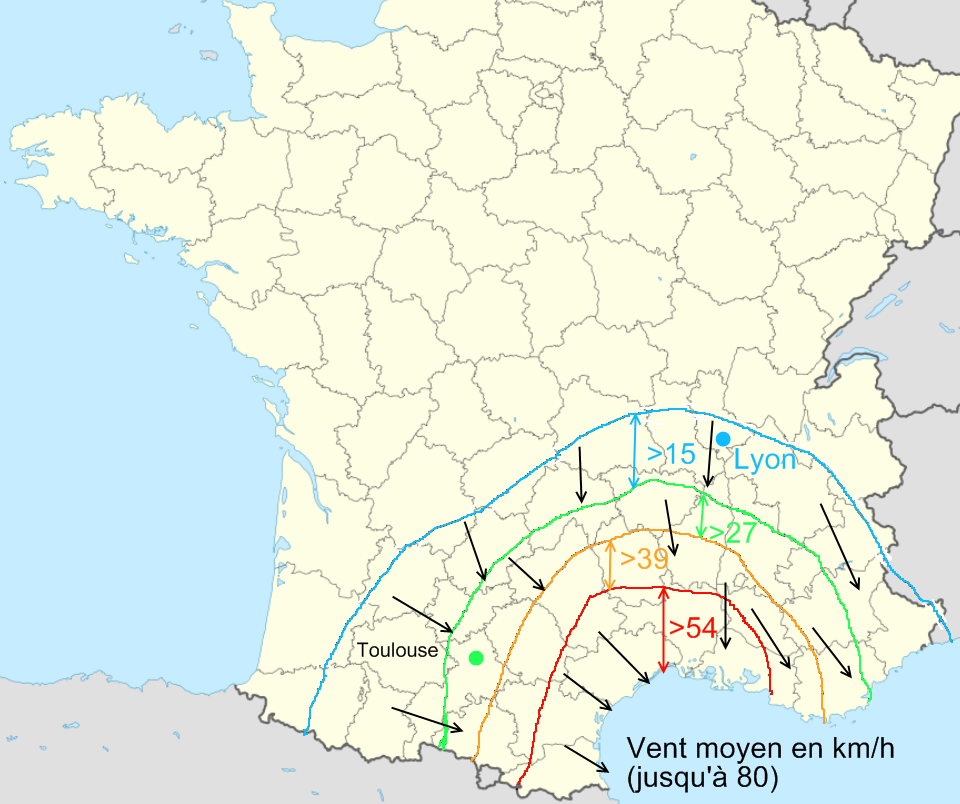
A map showing the force of the mistral one day in November 2008. The wind reached a speed of 80 km/h (50 mph), with average speeds of more than 50 km/h (31 mph) near Marseille.

The mistral takes place each time there is an anticyclone, or area of high pressure, in the Bay of Biscay, and an area of low pressure around the Gulf of Genoa. When this happens, the flow of air between the high and low pressure areas draws in a current of cold air from the north which accelerates through the lower elevations between the foothills of the Alps and the Cevennes. The conditions for a mistral are even more favorable when a cold rainy front has crossed France from the northwest to the southeast as far as the Mediterranean. This cold, dry wind usually causes a period of cloudless skies and luminous sunshine, which gives the mistral its reputation for making the sky especially clear. There is also, however, the mistral noir, which brings clouds and rain. The mistral noir occurs when the Azores High is extended and draws in unusually moist air from the northwest.

The long and enclosed shape of the Rhône Valley, and the Venturi effect of funnelling the air through a narrowing space, are frequently cited as the reasons for the speed and force of the mistral, but the reasons are apparently more complex. The mistral reaches its maximum speed not at the narrowest part of the Rhône Valley, south of Valence, but much farther south, where the valley has widened. Also, the wind occurs not just in the valley, but high above in the atmosphere, up to the troposphere, 3 km (1.9 mi) above the earth. The mistral is very strong at the summit of Mont Ventoux, 1900 meters (6300') in elevation, though the plain below is very wide. Other contributing factors to the strength of the mistral are the accumulation of masses of cold air, whose volume is greater, pouring down the mountains and valleys to the lower elevations. This is similar to a foehn wind, but unlike a foehn wind the descent in altitude does not significantly warm the mistral. The causes and characteristics of the mistral are very similar to those of the Tramontane, another wind of the French Mediterranean region.

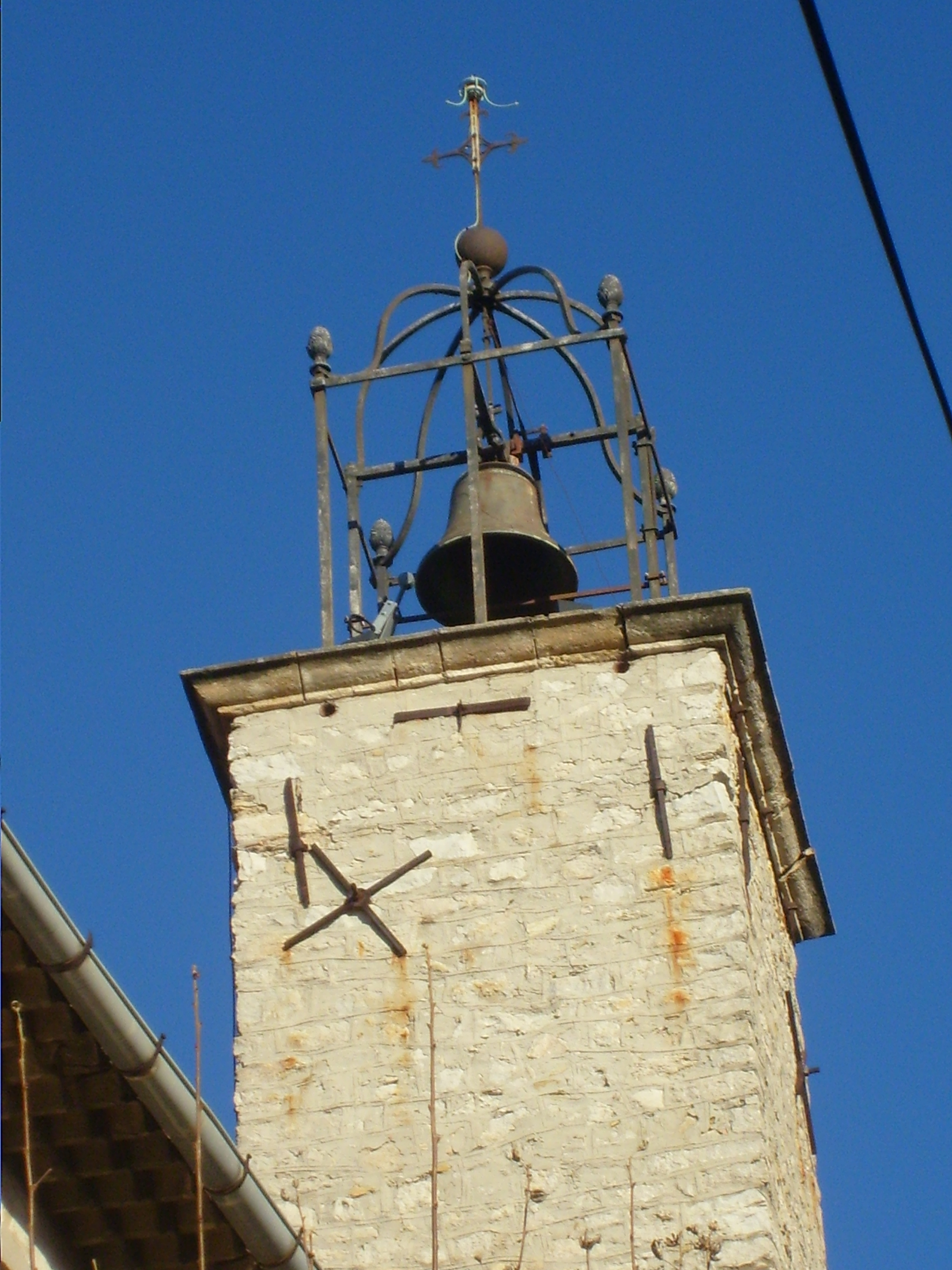
The bell tower of the hilltop village of La Cadière-d'Azur is open, which allows the mistral to pass through.

In France, the mistral particularly affects Provence, Languedoc east of Montpellier, as well as all of the Rhône Valley from Lyon to Marseille, and as far southeast as Corsica and Sardinia. The mistral usually blows from the north or northwest, but in certain pre-alpine valleys and along the Côte d'Azur, the wind is channelled by the mountains so that it blows from east to west. Sometimes it also blows from the north-northeast toward the east of Languedoc as far as Cap Béar. Frequently, the mistral will affect only one part of the region.

In the Languedoc area, where the tramontane is the strongest wind, the mistral and the tramontane blow together onto the Gulf of Lion and the northwest of the western Mediterranean, and can be felt to the east of the Balearic Islands, in Sardinia, and sometimes as far as the coast of Africa.

When the mistral blows from the west, the mass of air is not so cold and the wind only affects the plain of the Rhône delta and the Côte d'Azur. The good weather is confined to the coast of the Mediterranean, while it can rain in the interior. The Côte d'Azur generally has a clear sky and warmer temperatures. This type of mistral usually blows for no more than one to three days.

The mistral originating from the northeast has a very different character; it is felt only in the west of Provence and as far as Montpellier, with the wind coming from either a northerly or north-northeasterly direction. In the winter this is by far the coldest form of the mistral. The wind can blow for more than a week. This kind of mistral is often connected with a low pressure area in the Gulf of Genoa, and it can bring unstable weather to the Côte d'Azur and the east of Provence, sometimes bringing heavy snow to low altitudes in winter.

When the flow of air comes from the northeast due to a widespread low pressure area over the Atlantic and atmospheric disturbances over France, the air is even colder at both high altitudes and ground level, and the mistral is even stronger, and the weather worse, with the creation of cumulus clouds bringing weak storms. This kind of mistral is weaker in the east of Provence and the Côte d'Azur.

The mistral is not always synonymous with clear skies. When a low pressure front over the Mediterranean approaches the coast from the southeast, the weather can change quickly for the worse, and the mistral and its clear sky changes rapidly to an east wind bringing humid air and threatening clouds. The position of the low-pressure front creates a flow of air from the northwest or the northeast, channeled through the Rhône Valley. If this low-pressure area moves back toward the southeast, the mistral will quickly clear the air and the good weather will return; but if the cold-weather front continues to approach the land, bad weather will continue for several days in the entire Mediterranean basin, sometimes transforming into what French meteorologists call an épisode cévenol, a succession of torrential rains and floods, particularly in the areas west of the Rhône Valley: the Ardèche, the Gard, Hérault and Lozère.

The summer mistral, unlike the others, is created by purely local conditions. It usually happens in July, and only in the valley of the Rhône and on the coast of Provence. It is caused by a thermal depression over the interior of Provence (The Var and Alpes de Haute-Provence), created when the land is overheated. This creates a flow of air from the north toward the east of Provence. This wind is frequently cancelled out close to the coast by the breezes from the sea. It does not blow for more than a single day, but it is feared in Provence, because it dries the vegetation and it can spread forest fires.

== Effects ==
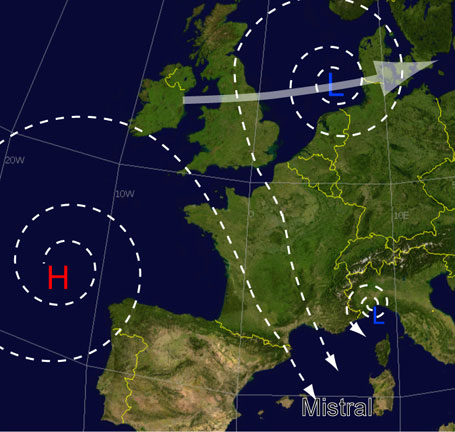
Schematic diagram of mistral wind occurrence in Europe.

The mistral helps explain the unusually sunny climate (2700 to 2900 hours of sunshine a year) and clarity of the air of Provence. When other parts of France have clouds and storms, Provence is rarely affected for long, since the mistral quickly clears the sky. In less than two hours, the sky can change from completely covered to completely clear. The mistral also blows away the dust, and makes the air particularly clear, so that during the mistral it is possible to see mountains 150 kilometres (93 miles) and farther away. This clarity of the air and light is one of the features that attracted many French impressionist and post-impressionist artists to the South of France.

The mistral has the reputation of bringing good health, since the dry air dries stagnant water and the mud, giving the mistral the local name mange-fange (Eng. "mud-eater"). It also blows away pollution from the skies over the large cities and industrial areas.

The sunshine and dryness brought by the mistral have an important effect on the local vegetation. The vegetation in Provence, which is already dry because of the small amount of rainfall, is made even drier by the wind, which makes it particularly susceptible to fires, which the wind spreads very rapidly, sometimes devastating vast expanses of mountainside before being extinguished. During the summer, thousands of hectares can burn when the mistral is blowing.

In the Rhône Valley and on the plain of la Crau, the regularity and force of the mistral causes the trees to grow leaning to the south. Once the forest has been razed by fire, the strong wind makes it difficult for new trees to grow. The farmers of the Rhône Valley have long planted rows of cypress trees to shelter their crops from the dry force of the mistral. The mistral can also have beneficial effects—the moving air can save crops from the spring frost, which can last until the end of April.

As summer visitors to the beach in Provence learn, the summer mistral can quickly lower the temperature of the sea, as the wind pushes the warm water near the surface out to sea and it is replaced by colder water from greater depths.

=== Beyond France ===
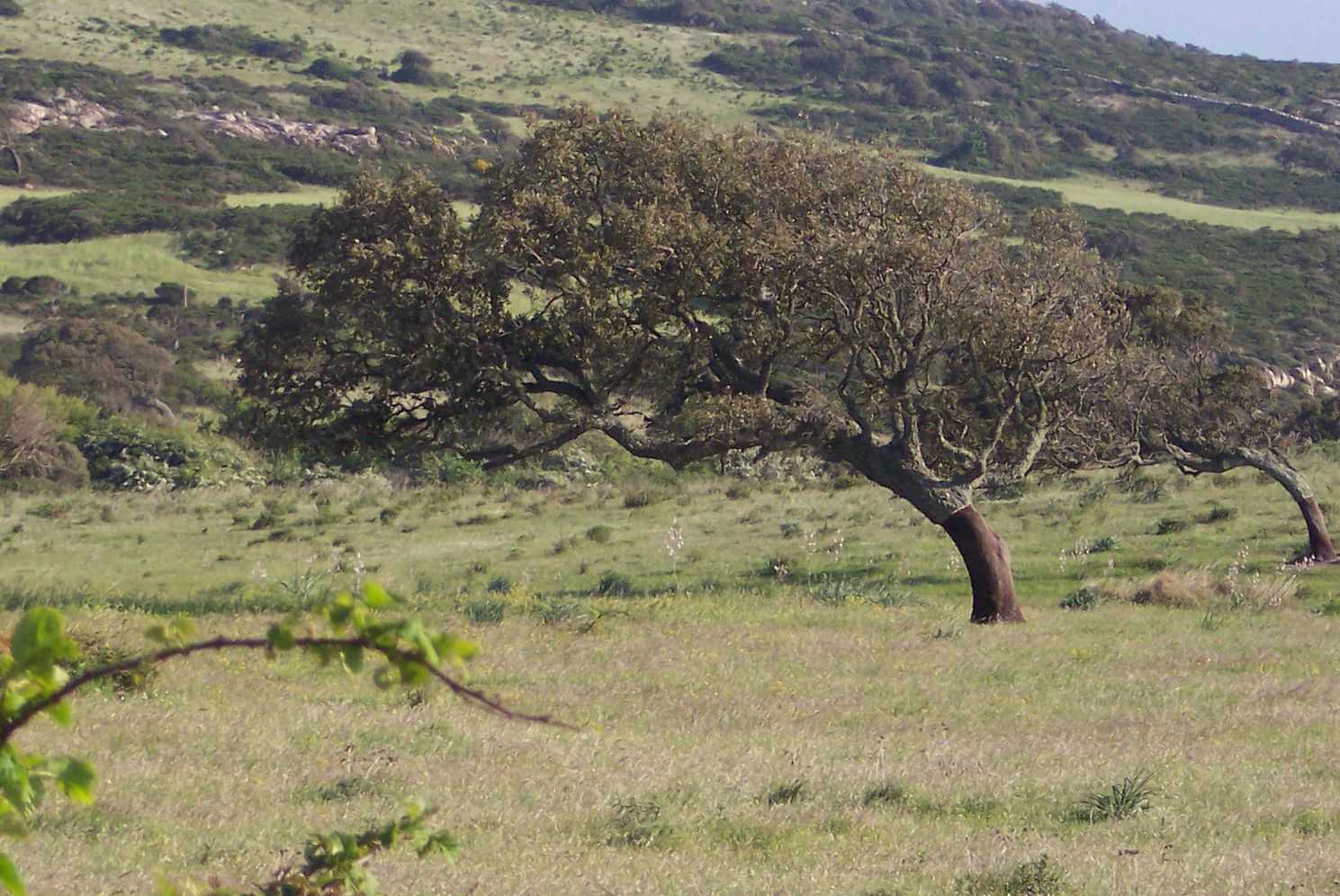
Oak bent to the south by the mistral in Sardinia

The mistral regularly affects the weather in Sardinia and sometimes also affects the weather in North Africa, Sicily and Malta and other parts of the Mediterranean, particularly when low-pressure areas form in the Gulf of Genoa. The winds create a physically cold, salty ocean body that sinks in the Gulf of Lion when certain weather conditions are present.

== Maestral or maestro in the Adriatic ==
Similar names—maestral or maestro—are used for (although also mostly northwestern) a quite different wind in the Adriatic Sea. It is an anabatic sea-breeze wind which blows in the summer when the east Adriatic coast gets warmer than the sea. It is thus a mild sea-to-coast wind, unlike the mistral. The strong katabatic wind there is the northeastern bora.

In Greece, it is also known as maïstros or maïstráli. In southwestern Crete, it is considered the most beneficial wind, said to blow only in daytime.

== In Provençal culture ==
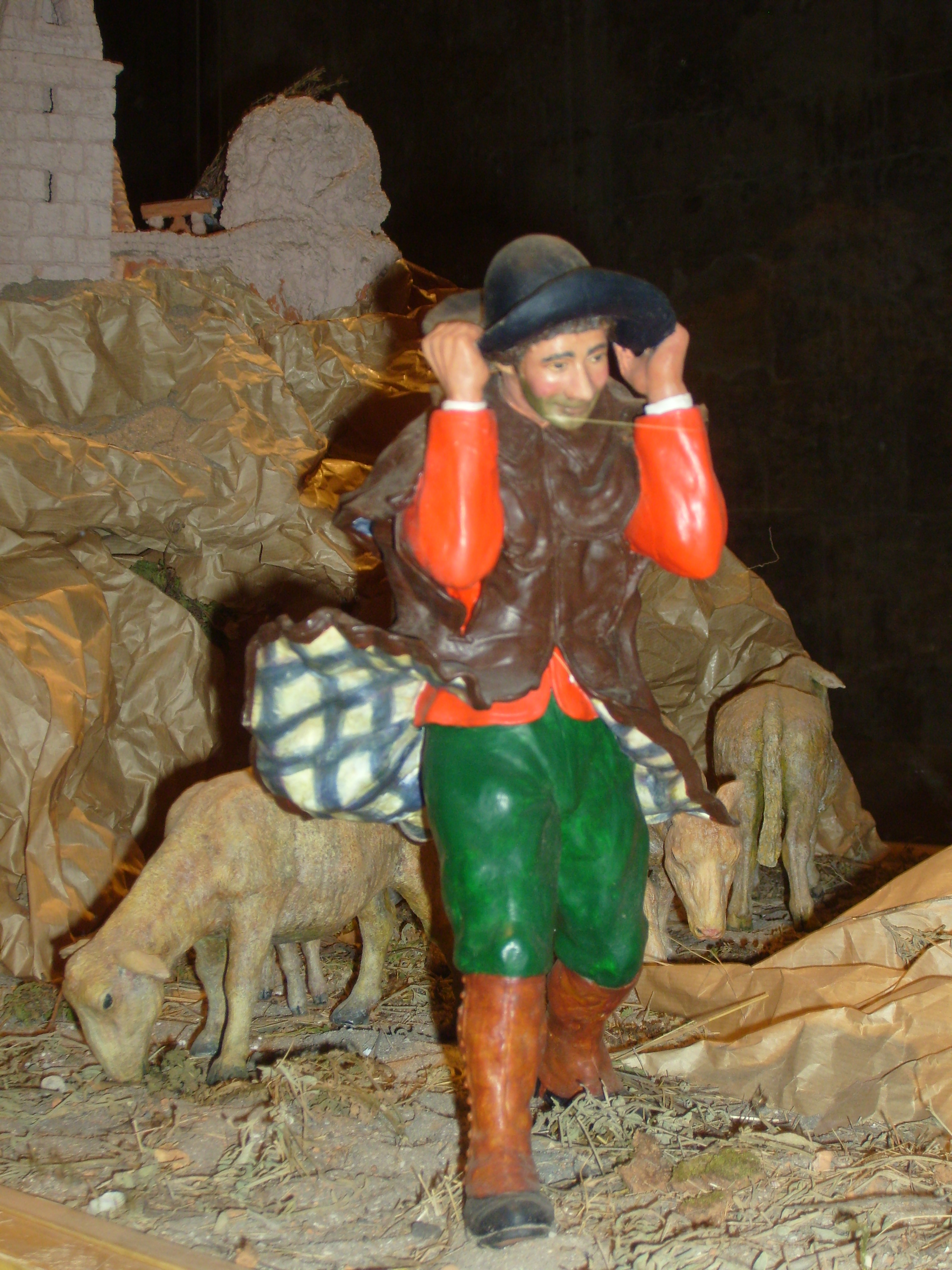
A traditional Provençal santon, or Christmas creche figure, from Arles, facing the mistral

The mistral played an important part in the life and culture of Provence from the beginning. Excavations at the prehistoric site called Terra Amata, at the foot of Mount Boron in Nice, showed that in about 40,000 B.C. the inhabitants had built a low wall of rocks and beach stones to the northwest of their fireplace to protect their fire from the power of the mistral.

The mas (farmhouse) traditionally faces south, with its back to the mistral. The bell towers of villages in Provence are often open iron frameworks, which allow the wind to pass through. The traditional Provençal Nativity scene usually includes a figure of a shepherd holding his hat, with his cloak blowing in the mistral.

A Fête du Vent (Festival of Wind) is held periodically on the Prado Beach in Marseille.

== In the arts ==
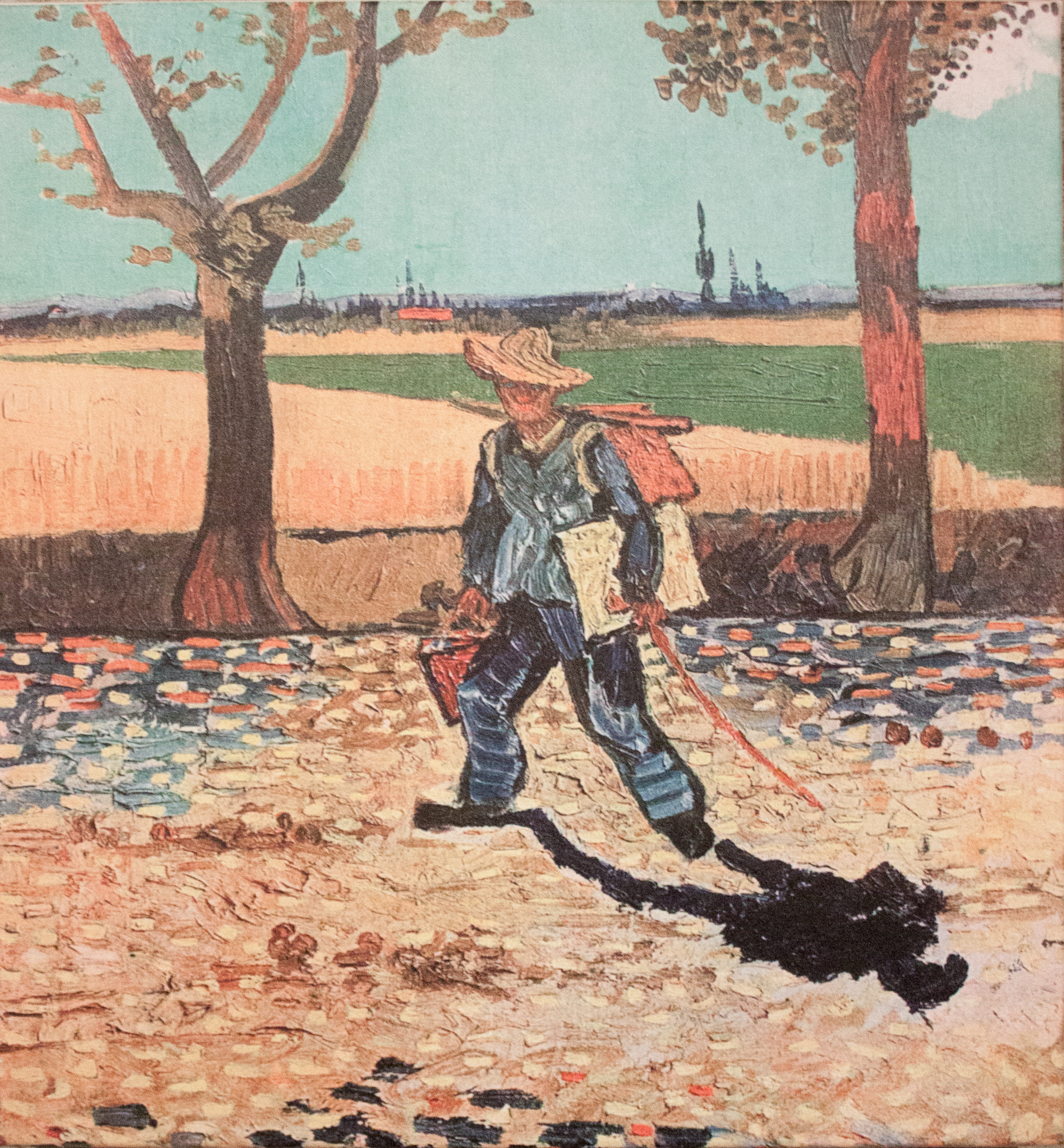
The Painter on His Way to Work (1888)

The Dutch post-impressionist painter Vincent van Gogh experienced the Mistral wind while living in the south of France, particularly during his time in Arles (1888–1889) and Saint-Rémy-de-Provence (1889–1890). The force of the Mistral made it challenging for van Gogh to paint en plein air (outdoors), as it could knock over his easel and blow dust and debris onto his canvas. He sometimes had to secure his easel with stakes to continue working.

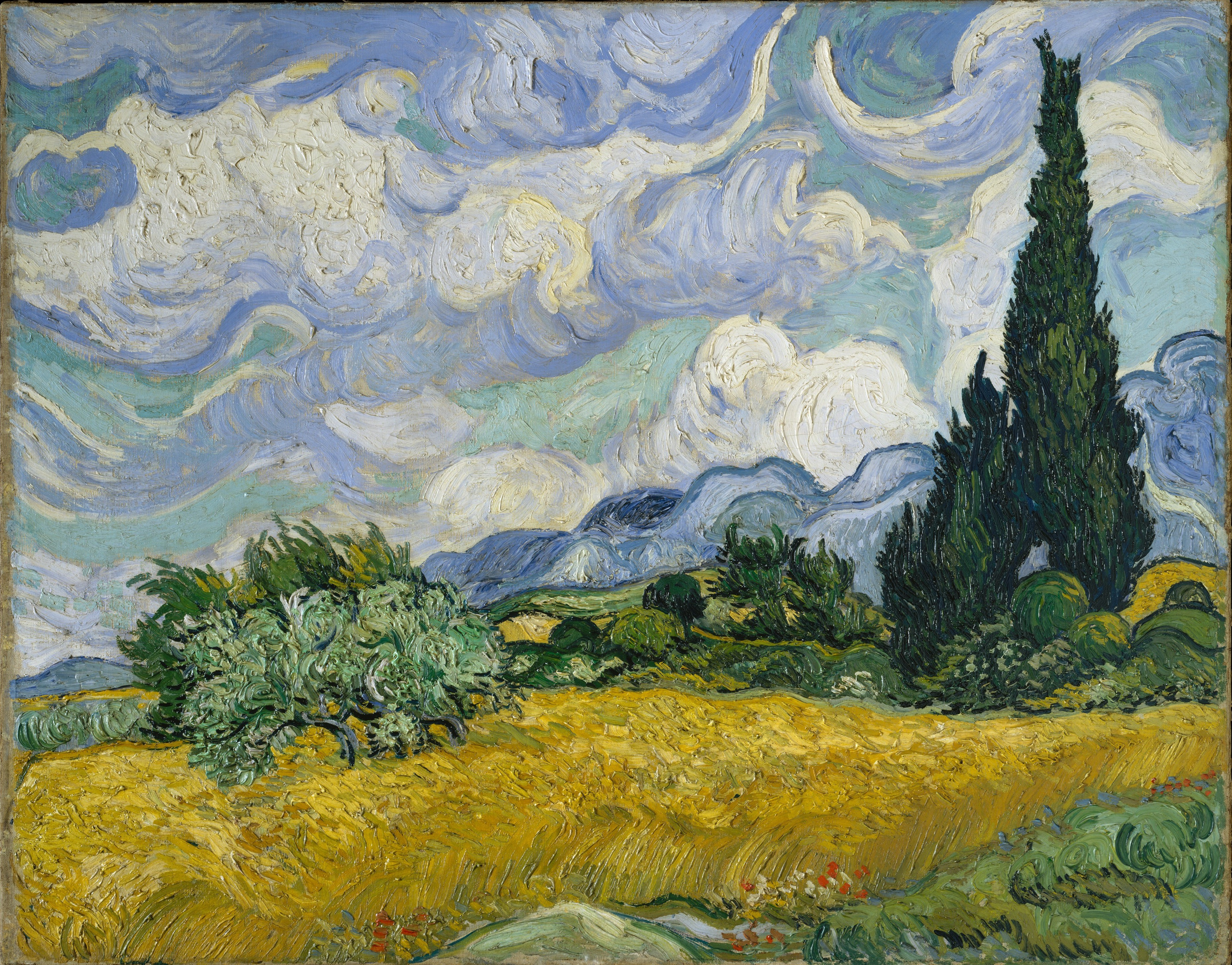
Wheat Field with Cypresses (1889)

Some scholars suggest that the swirling, dynamic movement in paintings like The Starry Night (1889) and Wheat Field with Cypresses (1889) might have been influenced by the wind's presence.

In his letters to his brother Theo and others, Van Gogh frequently mentioned the Mistral and its effects on both his artistic process and mental state. He described it as both artistically inspiring and physically exhausting, writing:

"The wind in this country—especially the Mistral—is something one has to wrestle with, but it does create the most beautiful effects in the wheatfields, with the movement and changing light."

== See also ==
- Winds of Provence
- Classical compass winds
- Bora (wind)
- Cers (wind)
- Chinook wind
- Cierzo
- Etesian
- Gregale
- Khamaseen
- Levant (wind)
- Levantades
- Leveche
- Marin (wind)
- Santa Ana winds
- Sirocco
- Tehuantepecer
- Tramontane
- Bugatti Mistral - open-top supercar named after the wind
