= Libeccio =

Wind in northern Corsica

The winds of the Mediterranean

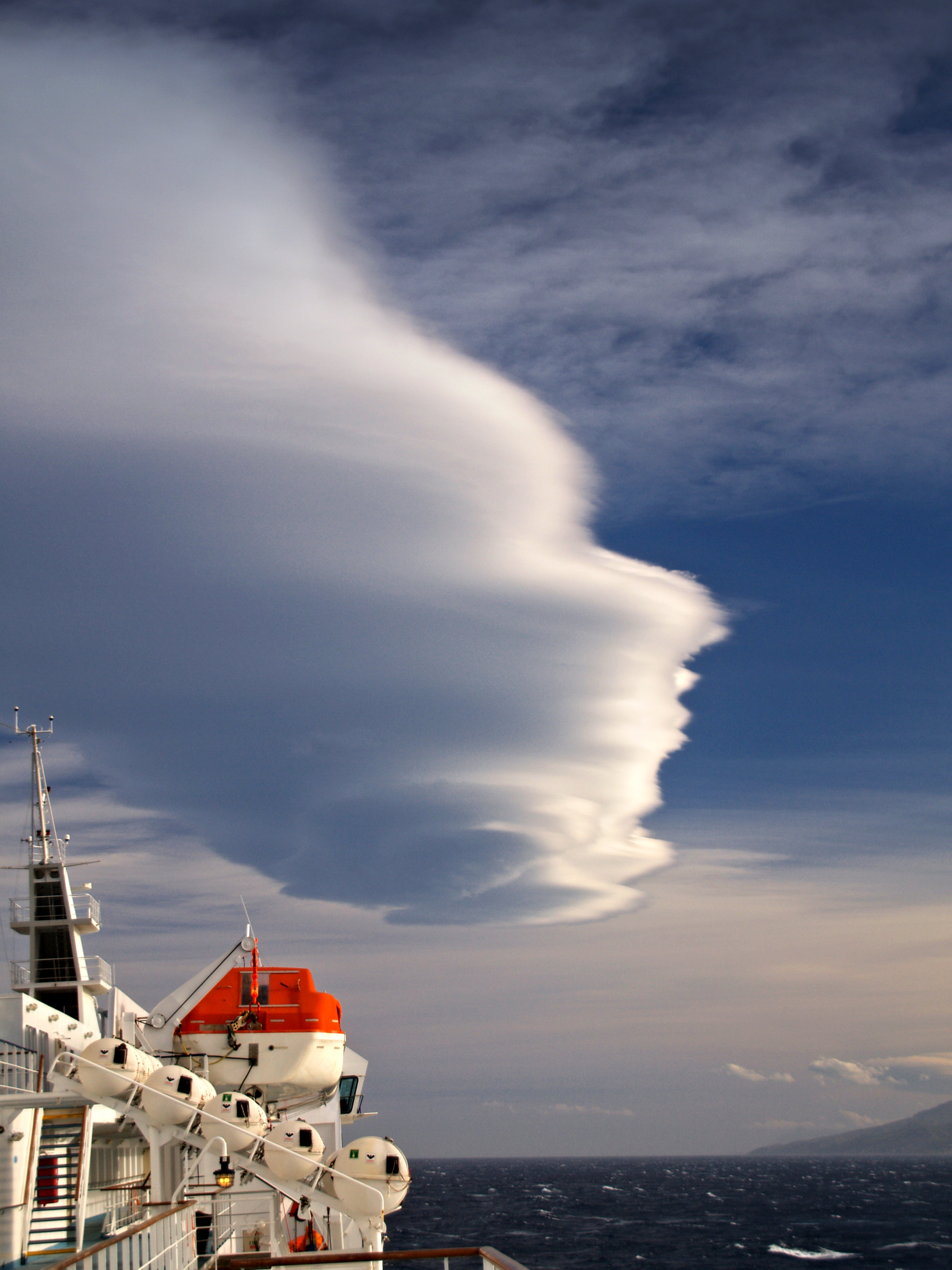
Libeccio above Bastia

The libeccio (/lɪˈbɛtʃioʊ/; Croatian: lebić [lěbitɕ]; Catalan: llebeig [ʎəˈβɛtʃ]; Maltese: Lbiċ; Greek: λίβας [ˈlivas]; Occitan: labech [laˈβetʃ]) (Note: Also known in some local variants as garbin (Catalan: garbí [ɡəɾˈβi]; Greek: γαρμπής [ɡarˈbis]; Italian: garbino [ɡarˈbiːno]; Serbo-Croatian: garbin [ɡǎrbiːn]; Spanish: garbino, garbín [ɡaɾˈβin(o)]; Occitan: garbin [garˈβi]).) is the south-westerly wind of the Western Mediterranean (which predominates in northern Corsica all year round); it frequently raises high seas and may give violent westerly squalls. In summer it is most persistent, but in winter it alternates with the Tramontane (north-east or north). The word libeccio is Italian, coming from Greek through Latin, and originally referred to the direction of Libya.

The libeccio blows from the south-west across the western and central Mediterranean basin.

== See also ==
- Bora (wind)
- Etesian
- Gregale
- Khamaseen
- Levantades
- Leveche
- Marin (wind)
- Mistral (wind)
- Sirocco
- Lodos
