= Gulf of Lion =

Wide embayment of the Mediterranean coastline of France

Coordinates: 42°59′47″N 4°00′01″E

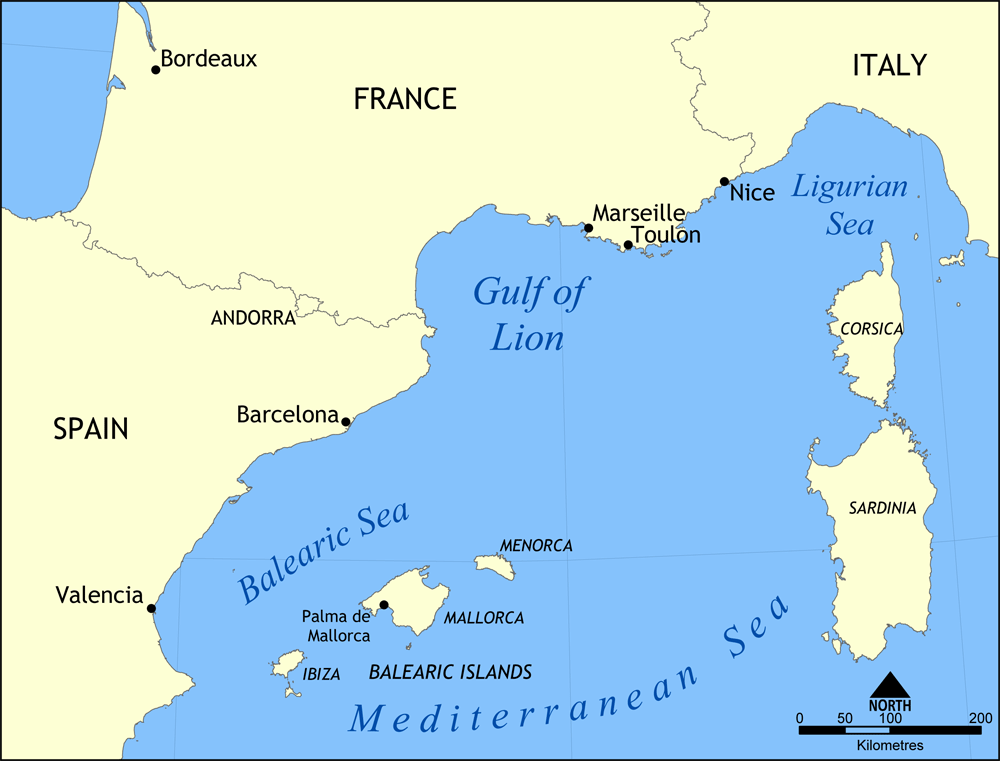
Map of the Gulf of Lion

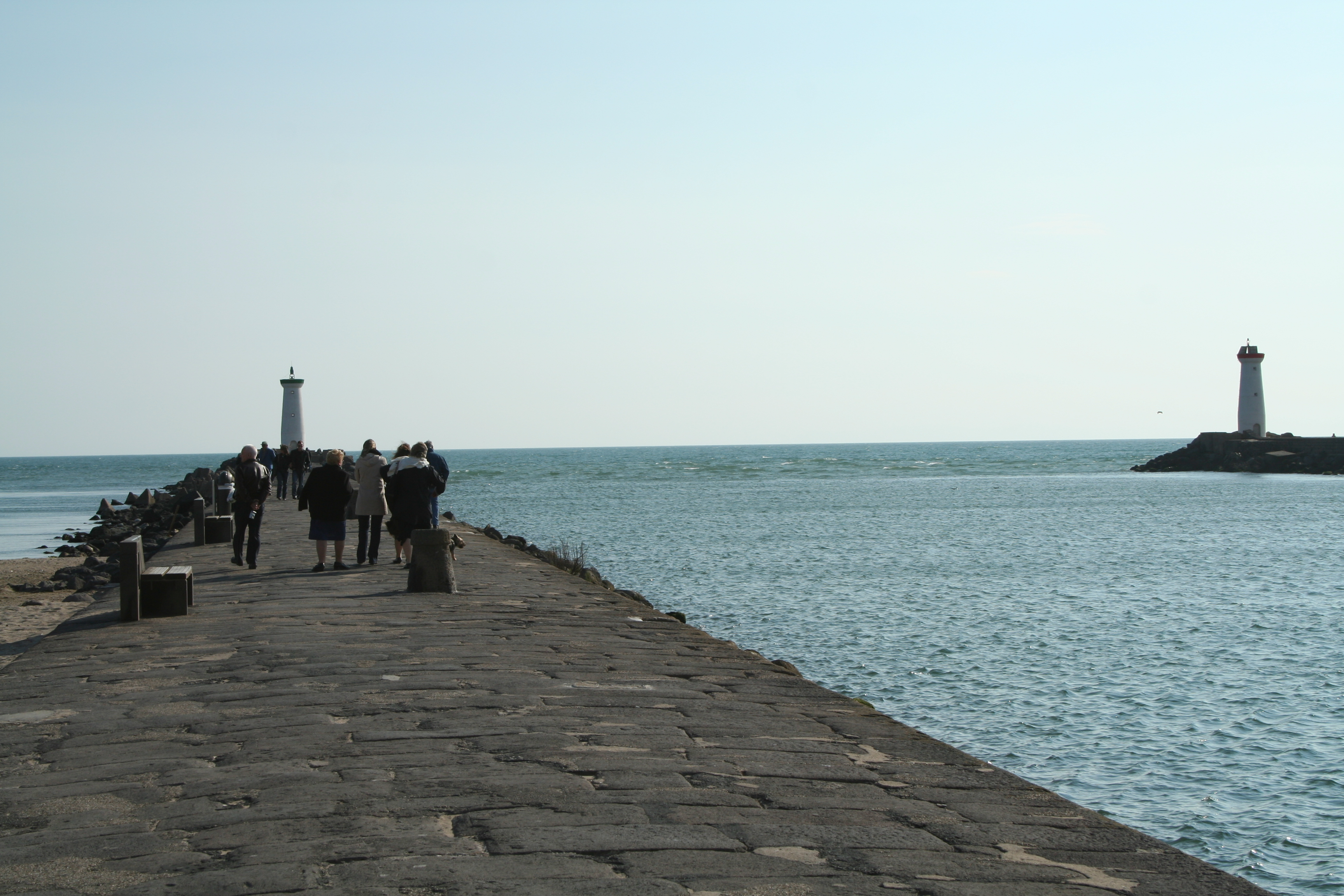
A view of the Gulf at the mouth of the Hérault.

The Gulf of Lion or Gulf of Lions is a wide embayment of the Mediterranean coastline of Catalonia in Spain with Languedoc-Roussillon and Provence in France, extending from Begur in the west to Toulon in the east.

The chief port on the gulf is Marseille. Toulon is another important port. The fishing industry in the gulf is based on hake (Merluccius merluccius), being bottom-trawled, long-lined and gill-netted and currently declining from overfishing.

Rivers that empty into the gulf include the Tech, Têt, Aude, Orb, Hérault, Vidourle, and the Rhône.

The continental shelf is exposed here as a wide coastal plain, and the offshore terrain slopes rapidly to the Mediterranean's abyssal plain. Much of the coastline is composed of lagoons and salt marsh.

This is the area of the cold, blustery winds called the Mistral and the Tramontane.

== Etymology ==
The current name of the gulf appeared at least during the 13th century (in medieval Latin sinus Leonis, mare Leonis) and could come from comparison with a lion: it would simply suggest that this part of the sea is as dangerous as a lion because it has very violent, surprising winds that threaten boats (sailors and fishermen know these dangers very well). This comparison with a lion is suggested by various converging sources: Deroy and Mulon's dictionary of French place names, Mistral's comprehensive Occitan dictionary, Diderot and D'Alembert's famous French encyclopedia and several texts in Latin since the 13th century.

These sources, especially Deroy and Mulon, Diderot and D'Alembert, reject the hypothesis according to which the name would be related to the city of Lyon, since it is too far from the gulf (However, the gulf does give access to Lyon, via the river Rhône).

A former name in classical Latin during Roman antiquity was sinus Gallicus (that is, "Gallic gulf").

== Geodynamics ==
The Gulf of Lion is not a simple passive continental margin; it results from Oligocene-Miocene counter-clockwise rotation of the Corsican-Sardinian Block against the European Craton. This extension rejuvenated a very complex tectonic framework inherited from the Tethyan evolution and the Pyrenean orogeny. The Eocene mountain-building event that built the Pyrenees compressed and thickened the entire crust. Oil geologists predict that there will be considerable oil deposits at the seaward margins of the gulf.

== Ocean dynamics ==
The gulf's bottom topography, the mistral, extended cold weather, and evaporation combine to create a sinking of surface waters which forms the Levantine Intermediate Water of the Mediterranean Sea.

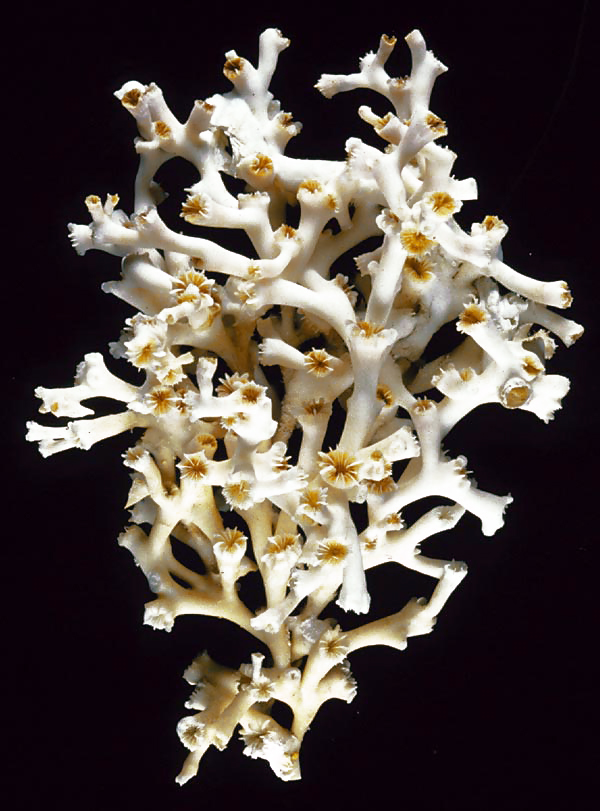
Lophelia pertusa

== Marine ecology ==
The Gulf of Lion is notable, according to C. Michael Hogan, for occurrences of biodiversity associated with the reef building organism Lophelia pertusa.

A wind park is planned.
