= Gregale =

Wind

The winds of the Mediterranean

The Gregale (Catalan: Gregal, Croatian: Gregal, Italian: Grecale, Lombard: Grecal, Maltese: Grigal, Occitan: Gregau, Greek: Γραίγος, Graigos) is a Mediterranean wind that can occur during times when a low-pressure area moves through the area to the south of Malta and causes a strong, cool, northeasterly wind to affect the island. It also affects other islands of the Western Mediterranean. The Italian name "Grecale" could be translated as Greek wind, as the wind starts at the Ionian Island Zakynthos.

== See also ==
- Bora (wind)
- Etesian
- Euroclydon
- Khamaseen
- Levantades
- Leveche
- Marin (wind)
- Maserati Grecale
- Mistral (wind)
- Sirocco
