= Sirocco =

Mediterranean wind

The winds of the Mediterranean

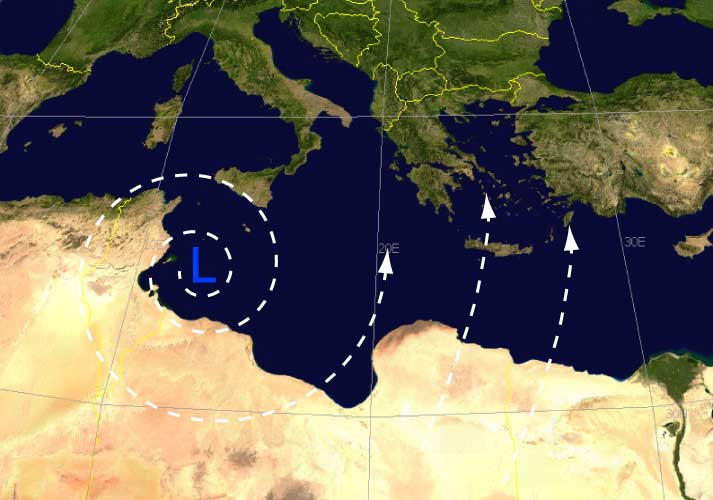
Sirocco wind

Sirocco (/sɪˈrɒkoʊ/ sih-RO-koh) or scirocco is a Mediterranean wind that comes from the Sahara and can reach hurricane speeds in North Africa and Southern Europe, especially during the summer season.

== Names ==
Sirocco derives from šurūq (Arabic: شروق), verbal noun of šaraqa, related to the East, aš-šarq. Various names for this wind in other languages include:

- Italian: scirocco
- Sardinian: bentu de subra
- Sicilian: sciroccu
- Spanish: siroco or marin
- French: sirocco
- Catalan: xaloc
- Maltese: xlokk
- Occitan: siròc or eisseròc
- Hungarian: sirokkó
- Greek: σορόκος, romanized: sorókos, or σιρόκος romanized: sirókos
- Albanian: jugu (south) or shiroku
- Serbo-Croatian: jugo, lit. 'southern' (Serbian Cyrillic: југо), in Croatia rarely širok (широк)
- Slovene: jugo, lit. 'southern'
- Ligurian: sciöco or mainasso
- Libyan Arabic: قبلي, romanized: qibliyy, which means "coming from the Qibla"
- Egyptian Arabic: خمسين, romanized: Ḫamsīn, which means 'fifty' ('fifty-day wind')
- Tunisian Arabic: شلوق, romanized: šlūq, probably from شروق šurūq with the same meaning as šarqiyya; or شهيلي šhīliyy
- Hebrew: שרקיע, romanized: šarqiyya, from Arabic. Also חמסין, Ḫamsīn, again from Arabic.
- Moroccan Arabic: شرقي, romanized: šarquiyy, lit. 'eastern', pronounced širguī (see: Chergui)

The Roman poet Horace refers to the sirocco at Trevico in Apulia as Atabulus (a Messapic word) in his account of his journey to Brundisium in 37 BC.

== Development ==
Siroccos arise from warm, dry, tropical air masses that are pulled northward by low-pressure cells moving eastward across the Mediterranean Sea, with the wind originating in the Arabian or Sahara deserts. The hotter, drier continental air mixes with the cooler, wetter air of the maritime cyclone, and the counter-clockwise circulation of the low propels the mixed air across the southern coasts of Europe.

== Effects ==
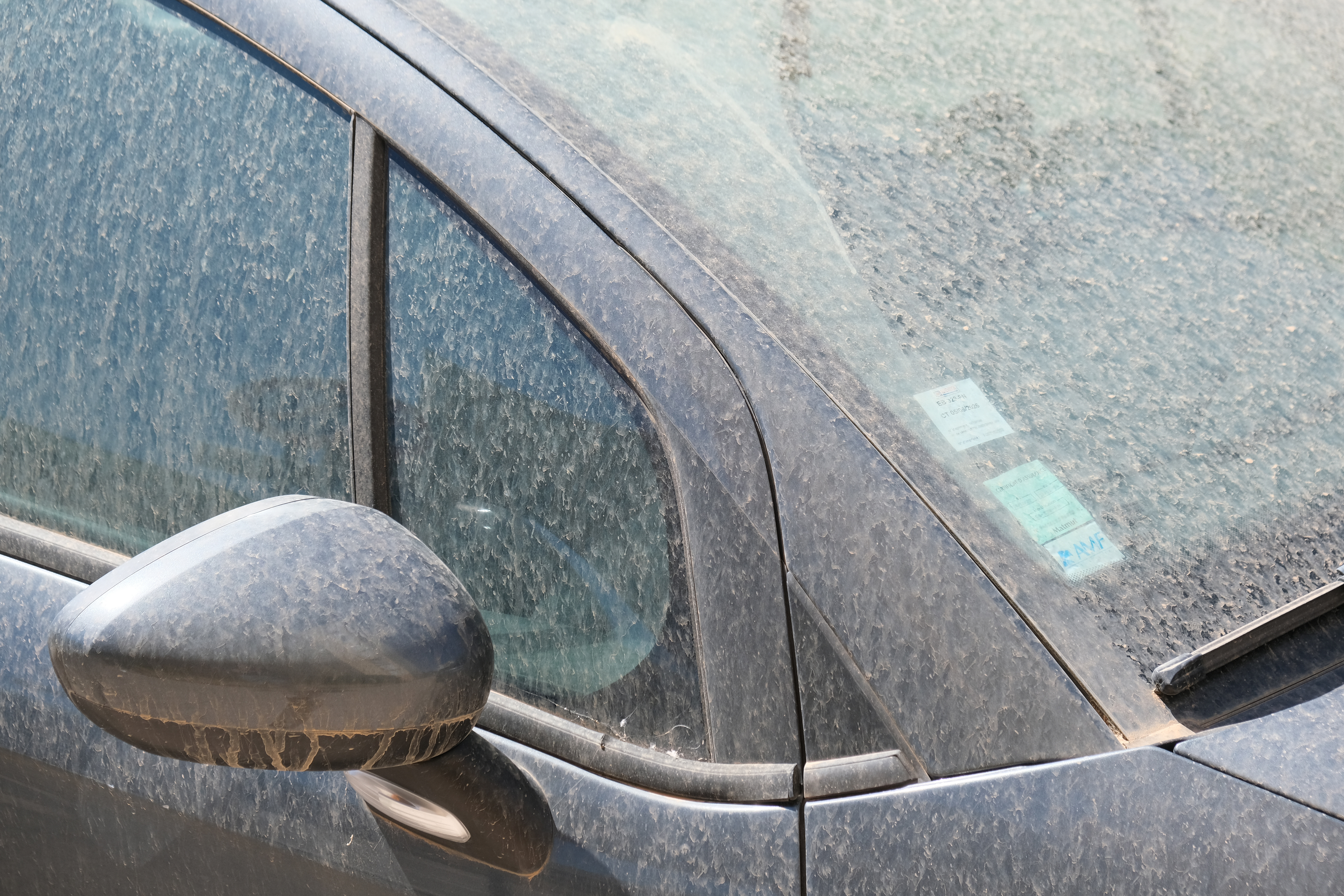
Effects of sirocco: Saharan dust in Vitrolles, France.

The sirocco causes dusty dry conditions along the northern coast of Africa, storms in the Mediterranean Sea, and warm wet weather in Southern Europe. The sirocco does not affect other parts of Europe. The sirocco's duration may be as short as half a day or may last several days. While passing over the Mediterranean Sea, the sirocco picks up moisture; this results in rainfall in the southern part of Italy, known locally as "blood rain" due to the red sand mixed with the falling rain.

Sirocco is commonly perceived as causing unease and an irritable mood in people. In addition, many people attribute health problems to the wind, either because of the heat and dust brought from African coastal regions, or because of the cool dampness further north in Europe. The dust in the sirocco winds can cause abrasion in mechanical devices and penetrate buildings.

Sirocco winds with speeds of up to 100 km/h (62 mph; 54 kn) are most common during autumn and spring. They reach a peak in March and in November.

When combined with a rising tide, the sirocco can cause the acqua alta phenomenon in the Venetian Lagoon.

This wind also has an impact on fishing. For example, the anchovies caught in the Gulf of Trieste, near Barcola, which are in great demand as a delicacy, are caught only in a sirocco. In cold winds, like the bora, the fish disappear into the Adriatic.

== See also ==
- Foehn wind – Dry downslope wind in the lee of mountains
- Notus – South wind god in Greek mythology
- Santa Ana winds – California weather phenomenon
- Volkswagen Scirocco
