= Bora (wind) =

Wind in areas near the Adriatic Sea

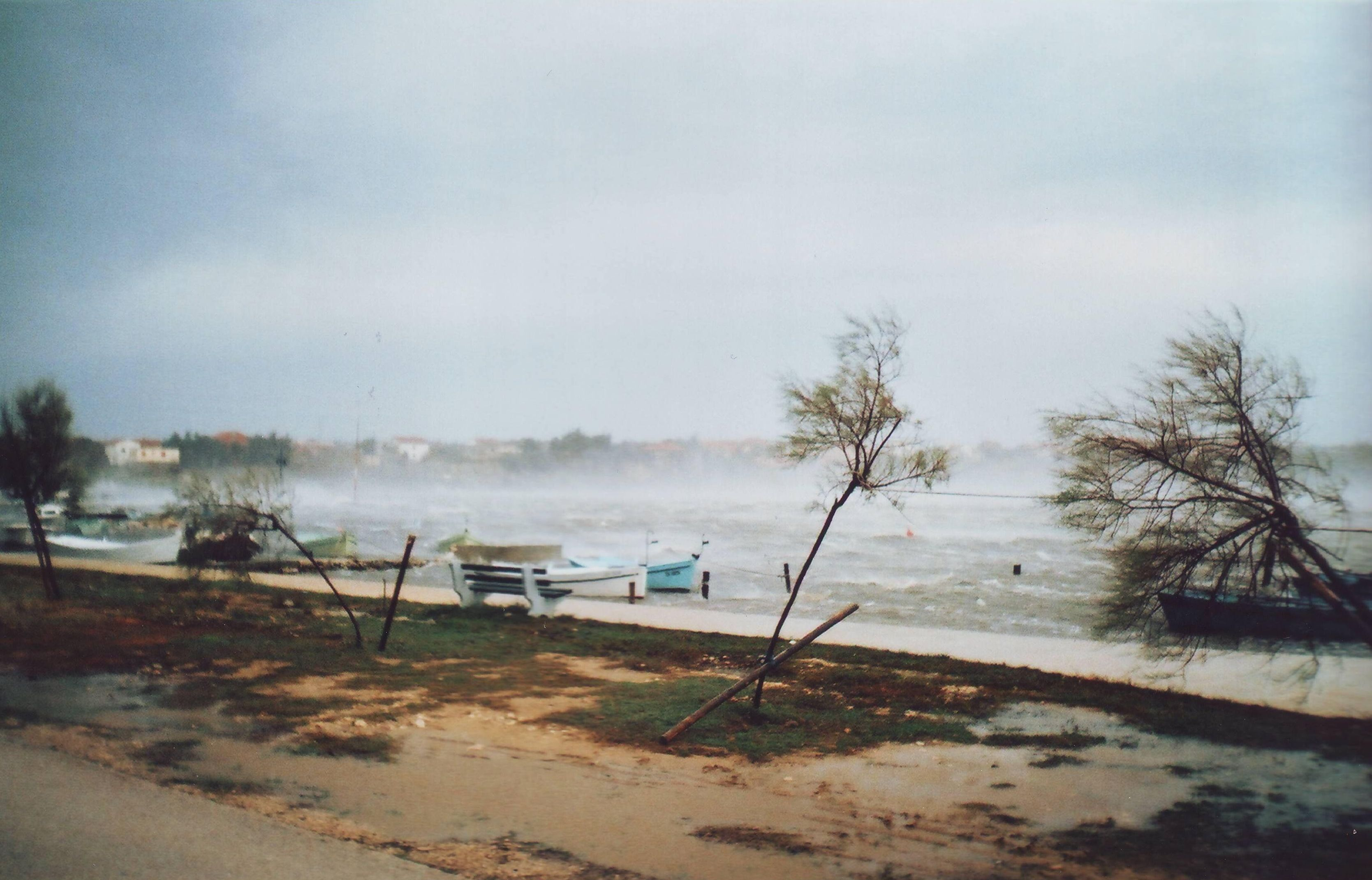
Hurricane-strength bora in Nin, Croatia

The bora is a northerly to north-easterly katabatic wind in areas near the Adriatic Sea. Similar nomenclature is used for north-eastern winds in other littoral areas of eastern Mediterranean and Black Sea basins.

== Name ==
It is known in Greek as μπόρα (mpóra, pronounced bora), Albanian as veriu and Italian as bora. In English, the name bora is used. The Serbo-Croatian name bura and Slovene burja are not etymologically related to bora; they derive from Common Slavic burja 'storm' (from the verb *burĭti), and the meaning 'bora' developed later.

The same root as bora is found in the name of the Greek mythological figure of Boreas (Βορέας), and the Modern Greek word for the north wind βοράς. Historical linguists speculate that the name may derive from a Proto-Indo-European root *g^{w}orh_{x}- 'mountain', which gave rise to Slavic gora and Sanskrit giri-, both 'mountain'.

== Features ==
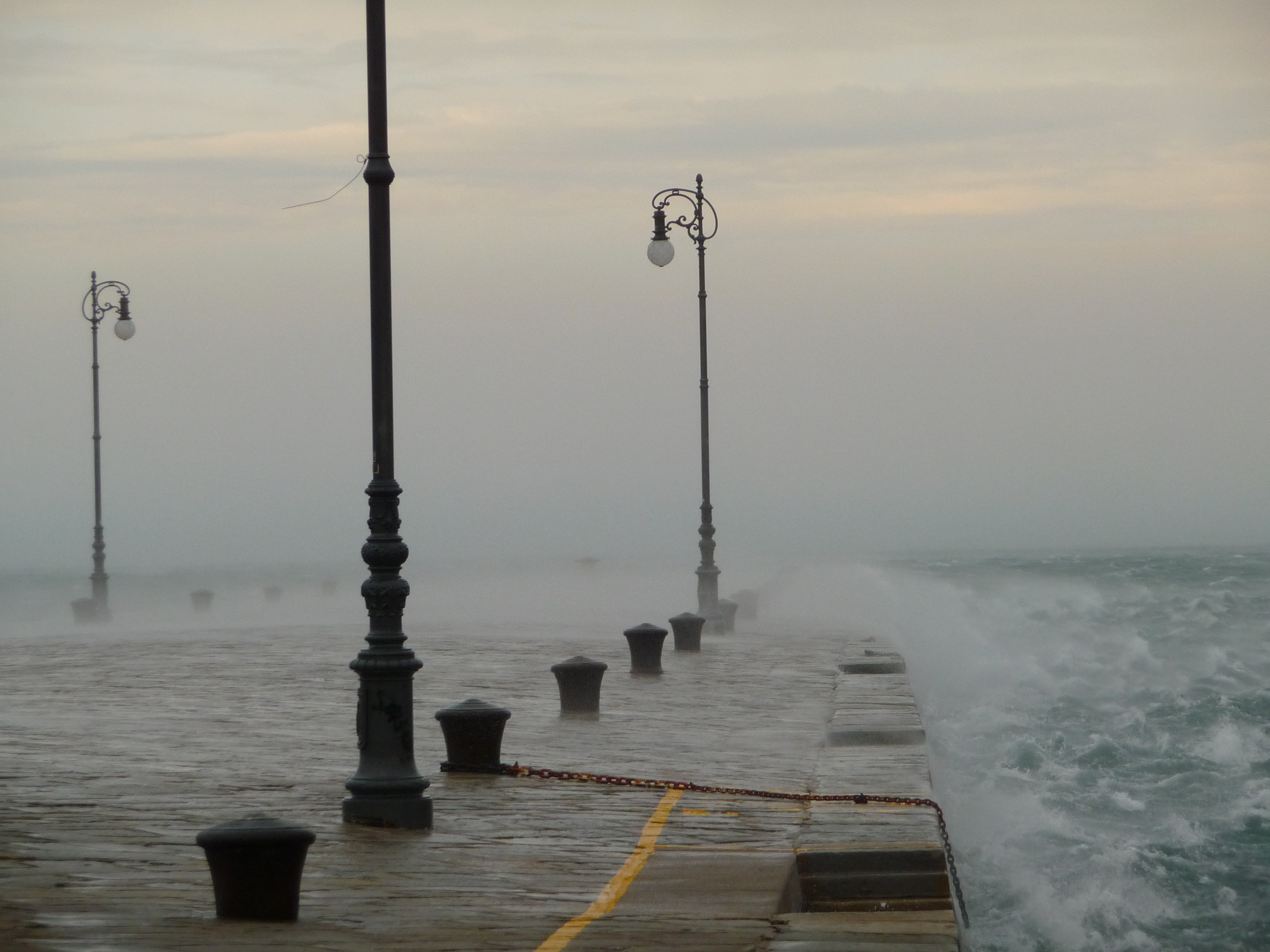
The bora on Molo Audace in Trieste, February 2011

The changeable bora can often be felt all over Adriatic Croatia, the Montenegrin Littoral, the Slovenian Littoral, Trieste, and the rest of the Adriatic east coast. It blows in gusts. The bora is most common during the winter. It affects coastal areas and it weakens into the open sea.

It blows hardest when a polar high-pressure area sits over the snow-covered mountains of the interior plateau behind the Dinaric coastal mountain range and a calm low-pressure area lies further south over the warmer Adriatic. As the air grows even colder and thus denser at night, the bora increases. Its initial temperature is so low that even with the warming occasioned by its descent it reaches the lowlands as a cold wind.

The wind takes two different traditional names in areas of Italy and Croatia depending on associated meteorological conditions: the "light bora" (Italian: bora chiara) is a bora in the presence of anticyclone clear skies, whereas cyclone clouds gathering on the hilltops and moving towards the seaside with rain or snow characterize the "dark bora" (Italian: bora scura, Croatian: škura bura).

== Areas affected ==
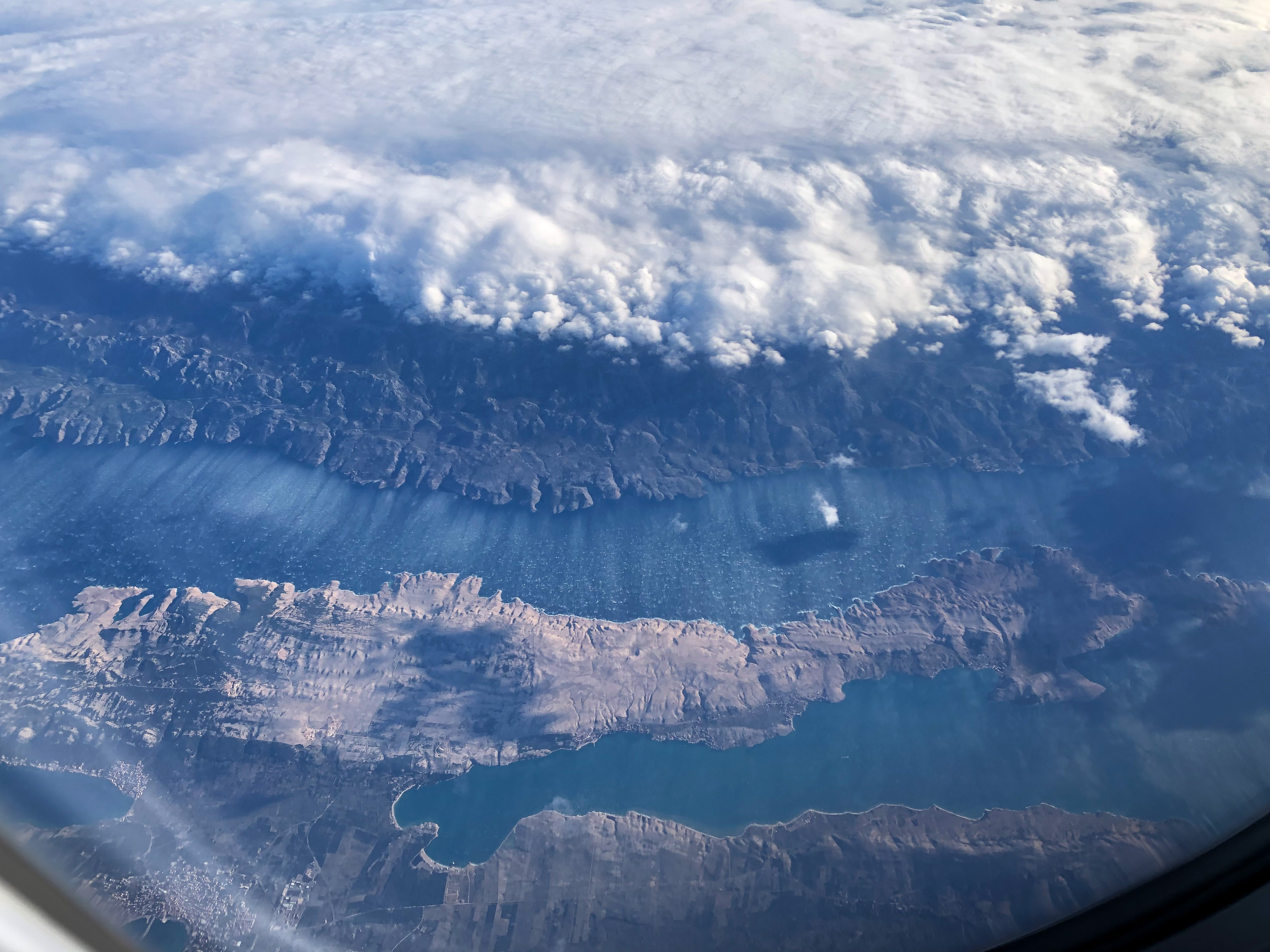
Bora seen from an aircraft near Novalja, Croatia (sea with white stripes)

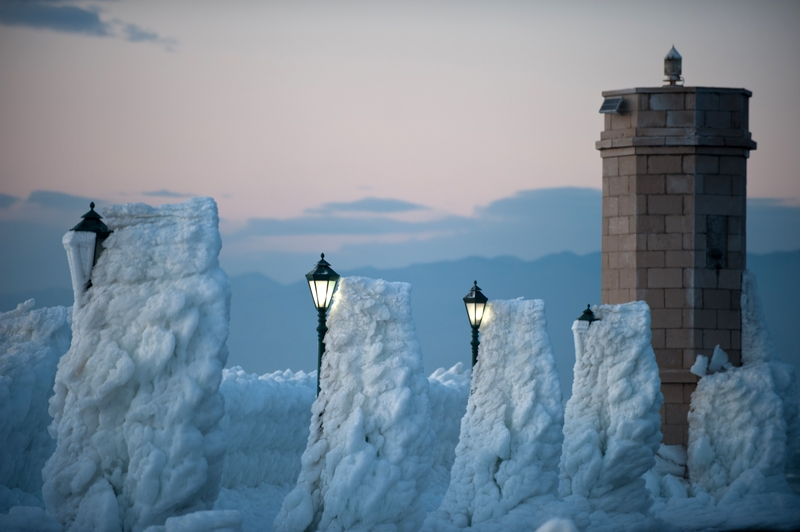
Senj during the 2012 European cold wave

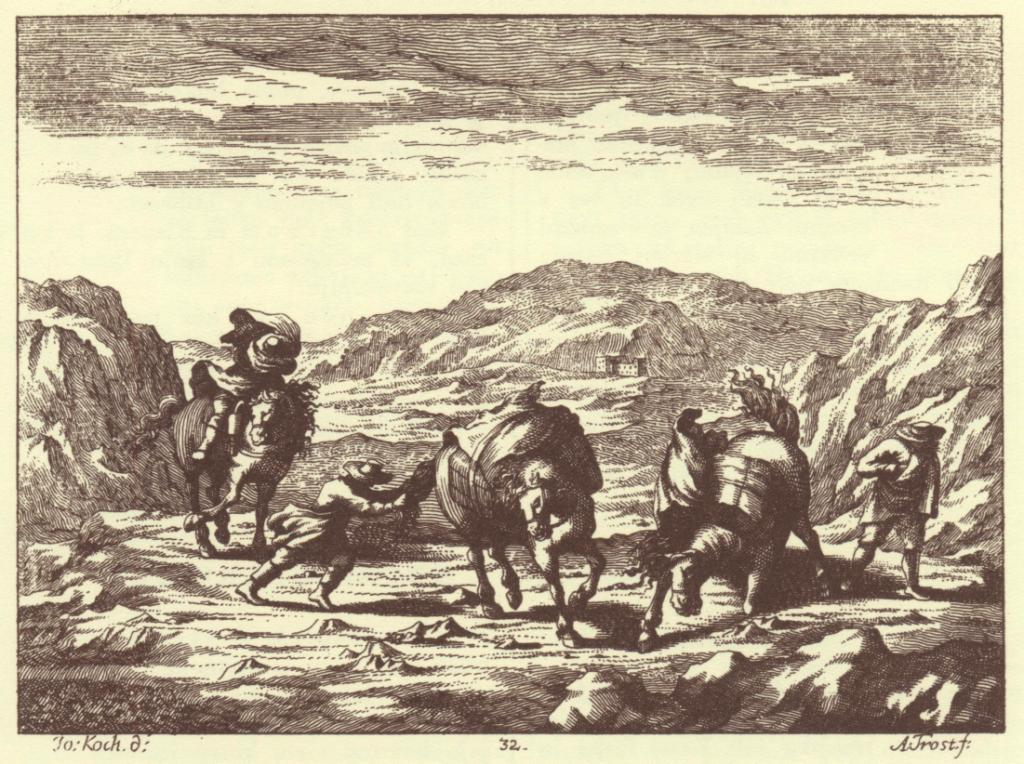
The bora on the Karst Plateau, depicted in Valvasor's The Glory of the Duchy of Carniola, 17th century

The area where some of the strongest bora winds occur is the Velebit mountain range in Croatia. This seaside mountain chain, spanning 145 km, represents a huge weather and climatic divide between the sharp continental climate of the interior, characterized by significant day/night temperature differences throughout the year, and the Adriatic coast, with a Mediterranean climate. The bora occurs because these two divided weather systems meet and tend to equalize over the mountain range.

Sailing during the bora can be challenging and it requires caution, regarding readiness of both the boat and its crew. Short, high waves with white crests are its characteristics, making navigation difficult. The small drops formed by the wind create a so-called "sea smoke" that reduces the visibility significantly. Experienced seamen have a proverb: "When the bora sails, you don't!" Sailing can be extremely dangerous for an inexperienced navigator in the Velebit Channel because the wind can start suddenly on a clear and calm day and result in major problems, frequently also affecting road traffic.

Near the towns of Senj, Stara Novalja, Karlobag and the southern portal of the Sveti Rok Tunnel in Croatia, it can reach speeds of up to 220 km/h. On 21 December 1998 the speed of a gust on the Maslenica Bridge (north of Zadar) was measured at a record speed of 69 m/s or 248 km/h. Wind shields were installed on that part of the highway. During 22 to 25 December 2003 on A1 highway near Sveti Rok Tunnel a reading measured the speed of 304 km/h, but this is not considered an official record because the instruments were not calibrated for such speed.

Incidents where the Adriatic Sea becomes covered in ice during a bura storm have been recorded in 1956 in Senj and 1963 in Makarska. The maximum duration of constant intense bura winds has been measured at 67–68 hours in Dalmatia. In February 2012, during the early 2012 European cold wave, the shoreline in Senj froze and snow piled up after a 150 km/h bora plummeted the temperature to −14 °C, with 7 meter-high waves. The bora ripped the trees from the soil and destroyed roofs of houses. On the island of Pag, the Bora threw fish out of the sea. In many Croatian coastal cities, fresh water froze inside the pipes.

The wind is also an integral feature of Slovenia's Vipava Valley and, to a lesser extent, the Karst Plateau (known as Carso in Italian), an area of limestone heights over the Gulf of Trieste stretching towards the Istrian peninsula. Because the region separates the lower Adriatic coast from the Julian Alps range, extreme bora winds often occur there. They have influenced the region's traditional lifestyle and architecture. Towns on the coast, where the bora frequently occurs, are built densely with narrow streets in part because of the wind. Buildings in several towns and villages in Slovenia and the Province of Trieste (Italy) have stones on their roofs to prevent the roof tiles from being blown off. Chains and ropes are occasionally stretched along the sidewalks in downtown Trieste, Italy, to facilitate pedestrian traffic – gusts in the city are usually above 120 km/h reaching to maxima of near 200 km/h. A strong bora will often be reported on Italian television news. Slovenian towns where the strongest bora occurs are Ajdovščina, Vipava and, to a lesser extent, Nova Gorica. In Slovenia, the most affected section is usually the upper part of the Vipava Valley, stretching from Ajdovščina to Podnanos, where the speed of the wind can exceed 200 km/h.

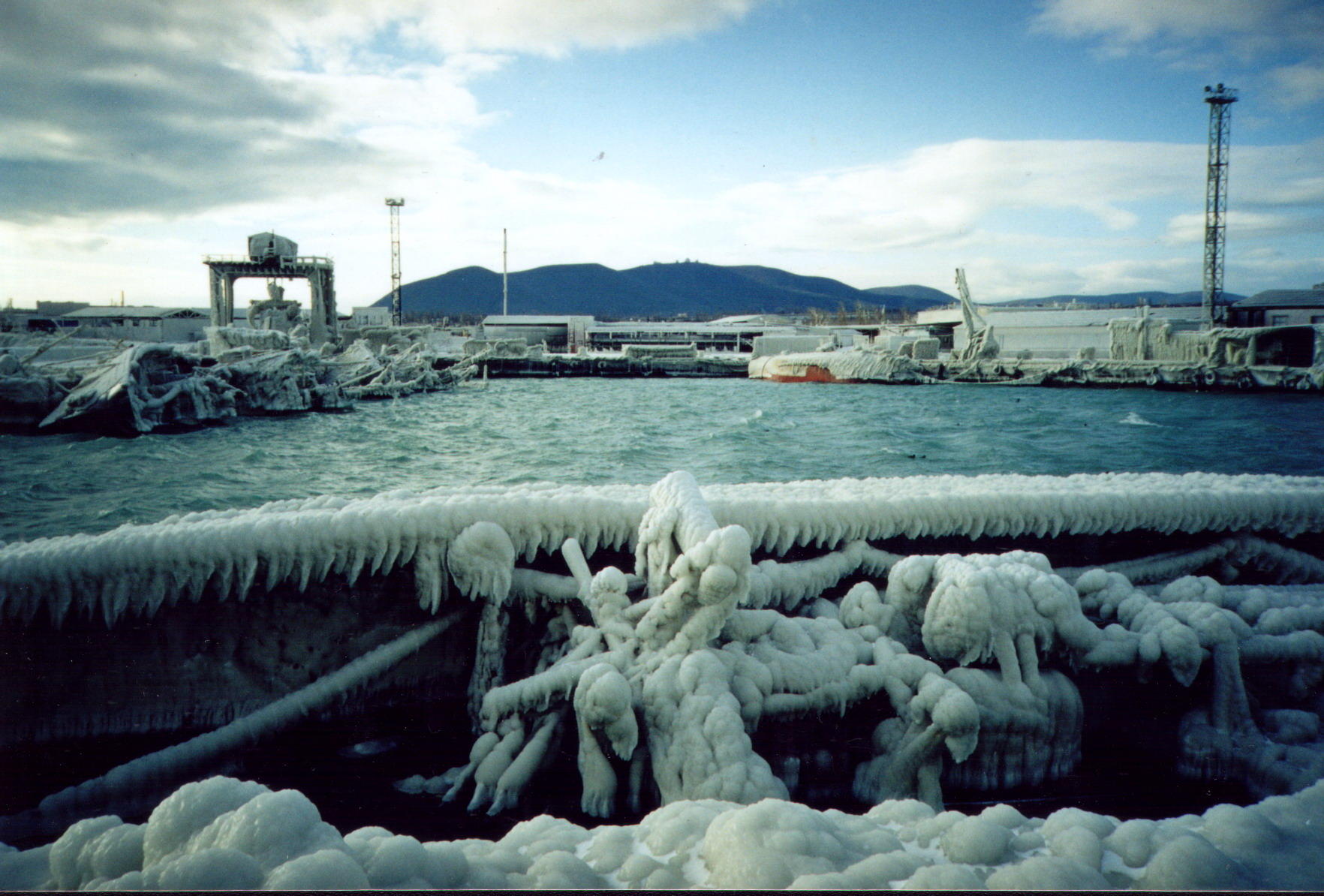
After bora catastrophe, Novorossiysk 1997

Strong bora winds also occur in the Tsemes Bay of the Black Sea near the Russian port of Novorossiysk, where they are known as nordost 'northeastern'. They can reach speeds of up to 220 km/h.

== See also ==
- Dzungarian Gate
- Oroshi
- Santa Ana winds
- Maserati Bora
- Volkswagen Bora

== Sources ==
- Bajić, Alica; Peroš, Bernardin; Vučetić, Višnja; Žibrat, Zvonko (2001). "Opterećenje vjetrom – meteorološka podloga za hrvatske norme" [Wind load – a meteorological basis for Croatian standards]. Građevinar (in Croatian). 53 (8). Hrvatski savez građevinskih inženjera. ISSN 1333-9095.
- Radić, Jure; Šavor, Zlatko; Puž, Goran (23 March 2018). "Report: Extreme Wind and Salt Influence on Adriatic Bridges". Structural Engineering International. 13 (4): 242–245. doi:10.2749/101686603777964487. S2CID 107402023.
- Sesar, Petar; Krečak, Ana (1 January 2005). "Impact of wind on Croatian highways and bridges". IABSE Symposium Report. 90 (11): 23–29. doi:10.2749/222137805796270469.
- Volarić, Božena; Nikolić, Davor (2014). "Zaleđivanje istočne obale Jadrana" [Icing of the sea on the eastern Adriatic coast]. Croatian Meteorological Journal. 48/49 (48/49). Hrvatsko meteorološko društvo. ISSN 1849-0700.
