= Heinrich Theodor Dittrich =

German philologist

Heinrich Theodor Dittrich (Latin: Henricus Theodorus Dittricus; fl. mid-19th century) was a German philologist and librarian.

== Works ==
Under the pseudonym B. Fabricius, he published a Latin edition on the surviving Greek fragments of the Periplus of the Outer Sea (i.e., the World Ocean) and epitomes composed by Marcian and the Periegesis or Periodos misattributed to Scymnus; an overview of his thoughts on the Greek bucolic poet Theocritus and on the lesser Greek geographers; heavily annotated Latin and German translations of the Greek Periplus of the Erythraean Sea (i.e., the Red Sea and Indian Ocean) misattributed to Arrian; a Latin translation of Isidore's Greek Parthian Stations; a heavily annotated Latin translation of the Greek Periplus of the Internal Seas (i.e., the Mediterranean and Black Seas) misattributed to Scylax; and a heavily annotated edition of the Latin elegies of Albius Tibullus.
