= Timosthenes =

Greek navigator

Timosthenes of Rhodes (Greek: Τιμοσθένης) (fl. 270 BCE) was a Greek navigator, geographer and admiral in Ptolemaic navy. He is credited with inventing the system of twelve winds that became known as the Greek 12-wind rose.

== Career ==
In the 280s–270s BCE, Timosthenes served as the admiral and chief pilot of the Ptolemaic navy of King Ptolemy II Philadelphus of Egypt. He wrote a periplus (a book of sailing directions) in ten books (now lost), and was much admired and cited by other geographers such as Eratosthenes and Strabo. Indeed, Marcian of Heraclea went so far as to accuse Eratosthenes' Geographica of being nothing but the wholesale plagiarism of Timosthenes work. Strabo says only that Eratosthenes preferred Timosthenes "above any other writer, though he often decides even against him."

Greek 12-wind rose, credited to Timosthenes

According to the later Greek geographer Agathemerus (fl.250 CE), Timosthenes of Rhodes developed a system of twelve winds. Timosthenes introduced the complete 12-point classical compass winds of Classical Antiquity. He was arguably the first of the Greek geographers to use the winds for geographic orientation, rather than merely as meteorological phenomena.

Strabo reports that Timosthenes wrote a "Pythian mood" (nomos) for a musical contest at the Pythian games at Delphi. Timosthenes's strain (melos), accompanied by flute and cithara, celebrated the contest between Apollo and the serpent Python.

Mount Timosthenes in Antarctica is named after him.
