= List of Graeco-Roman geographers =

Pre-Hellenistic Classical Greece

Reconstruction of the Oikumene (inhabited world) as described by Herodotus in the 5th century BC.

Reconstruction of Hecataeus' map

- Homer
- Anaximander (died c. 546 BC)
- Hecataeus of Miletus (died c. 476 BC)
- Massaliote Periplus (6th century BC)
- Scylax of Caryanda (6th century BC)
- Herodotus (died c. 425 BC)
- Ctesias (c. 401 BC)

Hellenistic period

- Pytheas (died c. 310 BC)
- Periplus of Pseudo-Scylax (3rd or 4th century BC)
- Megasthenes (died c. 290 BC)
- Autolycus of Pitane (died c. 290 BC)
- Dicaearchus (died c. 285 BC)
- Deimakos (3rd century BC)
- Timosthenes (fl. 270s BC)
- Eratosthenes (c. 276–194 BC)
- Scymnus of Chios (fl. 180s BC)
- Hipparchus (c. 190–120 BC)
- Agatharchides (2nd century BC)
- Posidonius (c. 135–51 BC)
- Pseudo-Scymnus (c. 90 BC)
- Diodorus Siculus (c. 90–30 BC)
- Alexander Polyhistor (1st century BC)

Roman Empire period

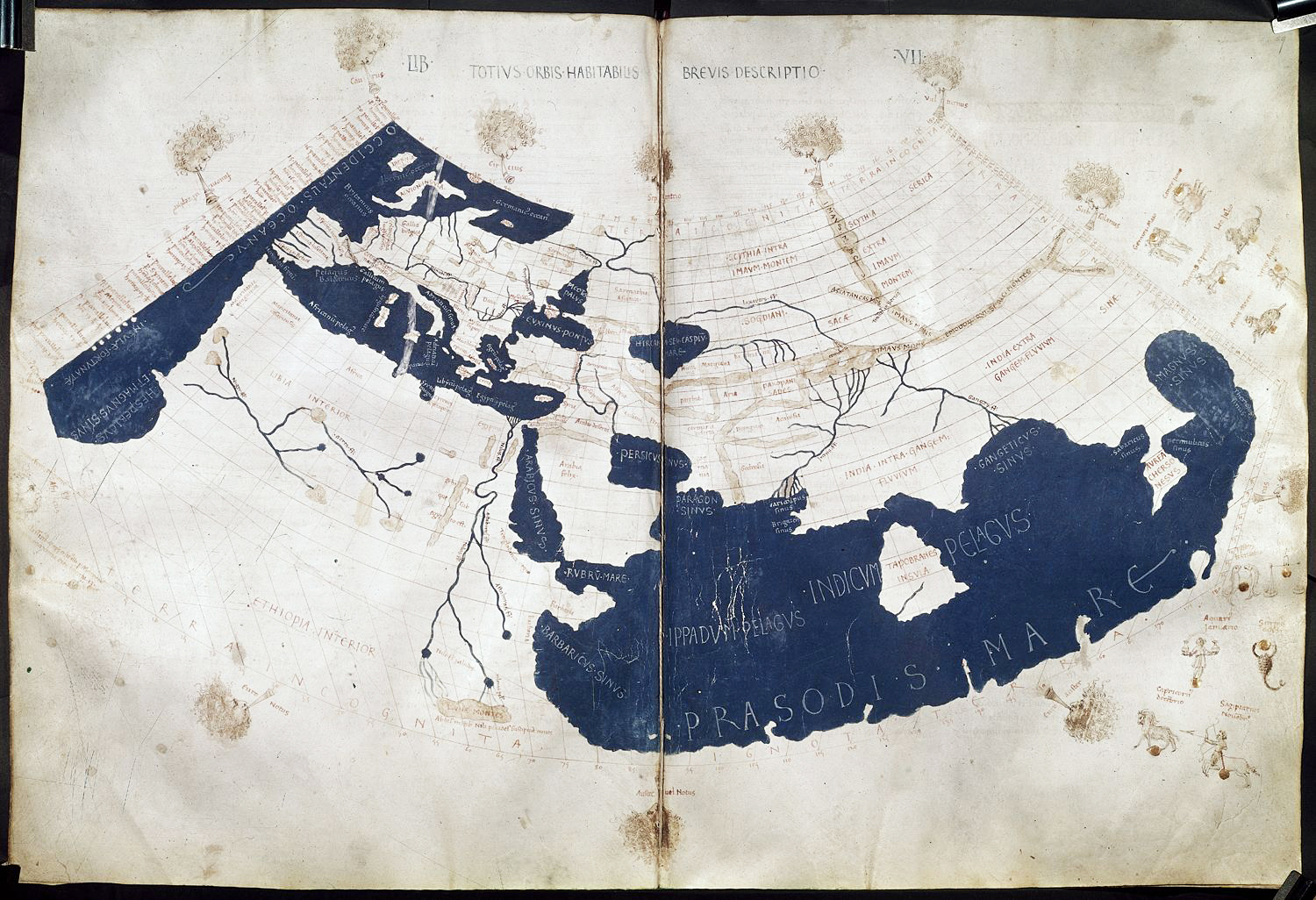
15th century reconstruction of Ptolemy's map.

- Periplus of the Erythraean Sea
- Strabo (63 BC – AD 24)
- Pomponius Mela (fl. 40s AD)
- Isidore of Charax (1st century AD)
- Mucianus (1st century AD)
- Pliny the Elder (AD 23 – 79), Natural History
- Marinus of Tyre (AD 70 – 130)
- Ptolemy (90–168), Geography
- Pausanias (2nd century)
- Agathedaemon of Alexandria (2nd century)
- Dionysius of Byzantium (2nd century)
- Agathemerus (3rd century)
- Tabula Peutingeriana (4th century)
- Alypius of Antioch (4th century)
- Marcian of Heraclea (4th century)
- Expositio totius mundi et gentium (AD 350–362)
- Julius Honorius (very uncertain: 4th, 5th or 6th century)

Byzantine Empire

- Hierocles (author of Synecdemus) (6th century)
- Cosmas Indicopleustes (6th century)
- Stephanus of Byzantium (6th century)

== See also ==
- History of geography
