= Scymnus =

Topics referred to by the same term

Scymnus may refer to:

- Scymnus of Chios, an ancient Greek geographer
- Scymnus (beetle), a genus in the family Coccinellidae
- Scymnus (subgenus), a beetle subgenus

== See also ==
- Pseudo-Scymnus, an unidentified ancient Greek geographer
- Isistius, a genus, containing the cookiecutter sharks, for which Scymnus is an archaic name
