= Neonteichos (Thrace) =

Fortified town on the coast of ancient Thrace

Coordinates: 41°01′05″N 27°49′28″E

Neonteichos (Ancient Greek: Νέον τεῖχος) was a fortified town on the coast of ancient Thrace, mentioned in the Periplus of Pseudo-Scylax and by Xenophon.

Its site is tentatively located near Servili in European Turkey.
