= Classical compass winds =

Historical wind directions

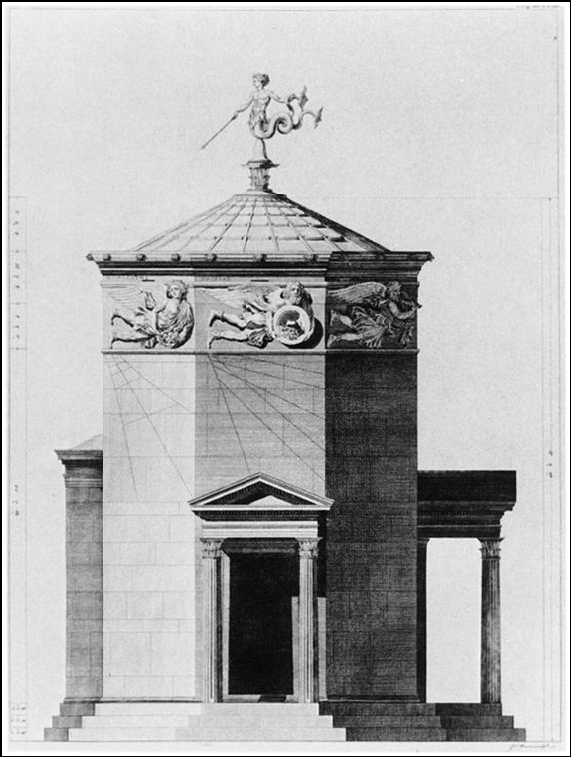
The Tower of the Winds in Athens, partly reconstructed, in 1762

In the ancient Mediterranean world, the classical compass winds were names for the points of geographic direction and orientation, in association with the winds as conceived of by the ancient Greeks and Romans. Ancient wind roses typically had twelve winds and thus twelve points of orientation, sometimes reduced to eight or increased to twenty-four.

Originally conceived as a branch of meteorology, the classical wind rose had only a tentative relationship with actual navigation. The Classical 12-point wind rose was eventually displaced by the modern compass rose (8-point, 16-point and 32-point), adopted by seafarers during the Middle Ages.

== Origins ==
It is uncertain when or why the human sense of geographic orientation and direction became associated with winds. It is probable that for ancient settled populations, local physical landmarks (e.g. mountains, deserts, settlements) were the initial and most immediate markers of general direction ("towards the coast", "towards the hills", "towards the lands of Xanadu", etc.). Astral phenomena, in particular the position of the sun at dawn and dusk, were also used to denote direction.

The association of geographic direction with wind was another source. It was probably farming populations, attentive to rain and temperature for their crops, that noticed the qualitative differences in winds – some were humid, others dry, some hot, others cold – and that these qualities depended on where the wind was blowing from. Local directional names were used to refer to the winds, eventually giving the wind itself a proper name, irrespective of the observer's position. This was likely furthered by sailors who, far from landmarks at sea, nonetheless recognized a particular wind by its qualities and referred to it by a familiar name. The final step, completing the circle, was to use the proper names of the winds to denote general cardinal directions of the compass rose. This would take a little longer to work itself through.

== Biblical ==
In the Hebrew Bible, there is frequent reference to four cardinal directions. The names of the directions seem to be associated with physical landmarks for the ancient Israelites living in the region of Judea, e.g. East is referred to as kedem, which may derive from "edom" ("red"), and may be a reference to the color of the rising dawn, or the red sandstone cliffs of the Land of Edom to the east; North is referred to as saphon, from Mount Zaphon on the northern edge of Syria, South is often negev, from the Negev desert to the south, and West is yam ("sea", meaning the Mediterranean Sea). Orientation seems to be to the East, in the direction of the rising sun, with the result that the terms kedem, saphon and negev became generalized with "facing", "left" and "right" side of anything.

The association of cardinal directions with winds is implied at several places in the Old Testament. "Four winds" are referred to in the Bible in several places. Kedem (East) is used frequently as the name of a scorching wind that blows from the east. It is related to the modern word קדימה "kadima", meaning "forward". There are several passages referring to the scattering of people "to all the winds".

== Greek ==
Unlike the Biblical Israelites, the early Greeks maintained two separate and distinct systems of cardinal directions and winds, at least for a while.

Astral phenomena were used to define four cardinal points: arctos (ἄρκτος, "bear", the Ursa Major, for North), anatole (ἀνατολή, "sunrise" or eos "dawn", East), mesembria (μεσημβρία, "noon", South) and dysis (δύσις, "sunset" or hesperus, "evening", West). Heraclitus, in particular, suggests that a meridian drawn between the north (arctos) and its opposite could be used to divide East from West. Homer already spoke of Greeks sailing with Ursa Major (or "Wagon"/"Wain") for orientation. The identification of the Pole Star (at that time, Kochab in the Ursa Minor) as the better indicator of the North seems to have emerged a little later (it is said Thales introduced this, probably learned from Phoenician seafarers).

Distinct from these cardinal points, the ancient Greeks had four winds (Anemoi). The peoples of early Greece reportedly conceived of only two winds – the winds from the north, known as Boreas (Βορέας), and the winds from the south, known as Notus (Νότος). But two more winds – Eurus (Εὖρος) from the east and Zephyrus (Ζέφυρος) from the west – were added soon enough.

The etymology of the names of the four archaic Greek winds is uncertain. Among tentative propositions is that Boreas might come from "boros", an old variant of "oros" (Greek for "mountains", which were to the north geographically). An alternative hypothesis is that it may come from "boros" meaning "voracious". Another is that it comes from the phrase ἀπὸ τῆς βοῆς ("from the roar"), a reference to its violent and loud noise. Notos probably comes from "notios" ("moist", a reference to the warm rains and storms brought from the south). Eurus and Zephyrus seem to come from "brightness" (q.v. Eos) and "gloominess" ("zophos") respectively, doubtlessly a reference to sunrise and sunset.

=== Homer ===
The archaic Greek poet Homer (c. 800 BC) refers to the four winds by name – Boreas, Eurus, Notos, Zephyrus – in his Odyssey, and in the Iliad. However, at some points, Homer seems to imply two more: a northwest wind and a southwest wind. Some have taken this to imply that Homer may have had as many as eight winds. However, others remain unconvinced, and insist Homer only had a four wind-rose.

Homer's winds (6-wind interpretation)

Writing several centuries later, Strabo (c. 10 BC) notes that some contemporaries took Homer's ambiguity to imply that the Homeric system may already anticipate the summer and winter distinction later made famous by Aristotle. This refers to the fact that the "east" (sunrise) and "west" (sunset) are not stable on the horizon, but depend on the season, i.e. during the winter, the sun rises and sets a little further south than in the summer, Consequently, the Homeric system may have had six winds – Boreas (N) and Notos (S) on the meridian axis, and the other four on diagonals: Zephyrus (NW), Eurus (NE), Apeliotes (SE) and Argestes (SW).

Strabo, quoting Posidonius notes that Homer sometimes used epithets of qualitative attributes to append ordinal directions to the cardinal winds, e.g. as western winds bring rain, then when Homer says a "stormy Boreas" he means a different wind from a "loud Boreas" (i.e. wet north = NW, loud north = N) Nonetheless, while it seems that Homer may have realized that there were more than four winds, he did not use those epithets systematically enough to permit us to conclude that he also embraced a six- or eight-point windrose. Other classical writers, e.g. Pliny the Elder, are adamant that Homer mentioned only four winds.

Hesiod (c. 700 BCE) in his Theogony (c. 735) gives the four winds mythical personification as gods, the Anemoi (Ἄνεμοι), the children of the Titan gods Astraeus (stars) and Eos (dawn). But Hesiod himself refers to only three winds by name – Boreas, Notos and Zephyrus – which he called the "good winds" and the "children of the morning" (engendering a little confusion, as it might be read as they were all easterly winds – although curious that Eurus is not among them). Hesiod refers to other "bad winds", but not by name.

The Greek physician Hippocrates (c. 400 BC), in his On Airs, Water and Places, refers to four winds, but designates them not by their Homeric names, but rather from the cardinal direction from which they blow (arctos, anatole, dusis, etc.) He does, however, recognize six geographic points – north, south and the summer and winter risings and settings – using the latter to set the boundaries for the four general winds.

=== Aristotle ===
The ancient Greek philosopher Aristotle, in his Meteorology (c. 340 BCE), introduced a ten-to-twelve wind system. One reading of his system is that there are eight principal winds: Aparctias (N), Caecias (NE), Apeliotes (E), Eurus (SE), Notos (S), Lips (SW), Zephyrus (W) and Argestes (NW). Aristotle then goes on to add two half-winds, Thrascias (NNW) and Meses (NNE), noting that they "have no contraries". Later, however, Aristotle suggests the Phoenicias wind for the SSE (blows locally in some places), but suggests nothing for SSW. So, seen this way, Aristotle really has an asymmetric windrose of ten winds, as two winds are effectively missing or only local.

Aristotle's wind rose (correspondence to modern compass directions)

North (N)	Aparctias (ἀπαρκτίας) (variant Boreas (βορέας))	the top meridian
North-Northeast (NNE)	Meses (μέσης)	the polar "rise"
Northeast (NE)	Caecias (καικίας)	the summer sunrise
East (E)	Apeliotes (ἀπηλιώτης)	the equinox sunrise
Southeast (SE)	Eurus (εὖρος) (variant Euronoti (εὐρόνοτοι))	the winter sunrise
South-Southeast (SSE)	No wind (except local Phoenicias (φοινικίας)	
South (S)	Notos (νότος)	the bottom meridian
South-Southwest (SSW)	No wind	
Southwest (SW)	Lips (λίψ)	the winter sunset
West (W)	Zephyrus (ζέφυρος)	the equinox sunset
Northwest (NW)	Argestes (ἀργέστης) (Variants: Olympias(ὀλυμπίας), Sciron (σκίρων)	the summer sunset
North-Northwest (NNW)	Thrascias (θρασκίας)	the polar "set"

Notice that in the Aristotelian system, old Eurus is shunted from its traditional position in the cardinal East by Apeliotes (ἀπηλιώτης), meaning "from the Sun" or from "the heat of the Sun". Old Boreas is mentioned only as an alternative name to Aparctias (ἀπαρκτίας), which means "from the Bear", that is, the Ursa Major, the Arctic Circle. Among the new winds are the Argestes (ἀργέστης) meaning "clearing" or "brightening", a reference to the northwest wind sweeping away clouds. Argestes's variants, Olympias (ὀλυμπίας) and Sciron (σκίρων) are local Athenian names, a reference to Mount Olympus and the Sciros rocks in Megara. The remaining winds also seem to be geographical. Caecias (καικίας) means from Caicus, a river in Mysia, a region northeast of the Aegean. Lips (λίψ) means "from Libya", to the southwest of Greece (although an alternative theory connects it to "leibo", λείβω, same root as libation, meaning pouring, because this wind brought rain). Phoenicias (φοινικίας) comes "from Phoenicia" (to the southeast of Greece) and Thrascias (θρασκίας) from Thrace (in Aristotle's day, Thrace covered a larger area than today, including the north-northwest of Greece). Finally, Meses (μέσης) might simply mean "middle", presumably because it was a half-wind.

The implication of reading Thrascias and Meses as half-winds, and the others as principal winds, is that this implies Aristotle's construction is asymmetric. Specifically, the half-winds would be at 22½° on either side of the North, while the principal eight would be at 45° angles from each other. However, an alternative hypothesis is that they will be more equally spaced around 30° from each other. By way of guidance, Aristotle mentions that the easterly and westerly positions are that of the sun as seen on the horizon at dawn and at dusk at different times of the year. Using his alphabetical notation, Aristotle notes that during the summer solstice the sun rises at Z (Caecias) and sets at E (Argestes); during the equinox, it rises at B (Apeliotes) and sets at A (Zephyrus), and finally during the winter solstice it rises at Δ (Eurus) and sets at Γ (Lips). So drawn on a compass rose, Aristotle's explanation yields four parallels:

Compass winds in Aristotle (30° angles)

- (1) the "ever-visible circle", i.e. the Arctic Circle, the boundaries of the circumpolar stars (stars which do not set) connecting half-winds IK),
- (2) the summer solstice (connecting EZ),
- (3) the equinox (connecting AB)
- (4) winter solstice (connecting ΓΔ).

Assuming the viewer is centered at Athens, it has been calculated that this construction would yield a symmetric compass rose with approximately 30° angles all around.

If set out on a compass card, Aristotle's system could be conceived of as a twelve-wind rose with four cardinal winds (N, E, S, W), four "solstitial winds" (loosely speaking, NW, NE, SE, SW), two "polar winds" (roughly NNW, NNE) and two "non-winds" (SSW, SSE).

Aristotle explicitly groups Aparctias (N) and the half-winds Thrascias (NNW) and Meses (NNE) together as "north winds" and Argestes (NW) and Zephyrus (W) together as "west winds" — but he goes on to note that both the north and west winds could be classified as "generally northerly" (Boreae), since they all tend to be cold. Similarly Lips (SW) and Notos (S) are "south winds" and Eurus (SE) and Apeliotes (E) are "east winds", but once again, both south and east winds are "generally southerly" (Notiae) because are all relatively warm (Aristotle reasons that as the sun rises in the east, then it heats east winds longer than west winds). With this general classification, Aristotle manages to account for the archaic Greek two-wind system.

The exception to this system is Caecias (NE), which Aristotle notes is "half north and half east", and thus neither generally northern nor generally southern. The local Phoenicias (SSE), is also designated as "half south and half east".

Aristotle goes on to discuss the meteorological properties of the winds, e.g. that the winds on the NW-SE axis are generally dry, while the NE-SW winds are wet (NE producing heavier clouds than SW). N and NNE bring snow. Winds from the whole northwestern sector (NW, NNW, N) are described as cold, strong, cloud-clearing winds that can bring lightning and hurricanes with them. Aristotle also makes special note of the periodic bending summer Etesian winds, which comes from different directions depending on where the observer lives.

Aristotle had aggrandized the wind system beyond Homer to ten winds, but he left it unbalanced. It would be left to subsequent geographers to either add two more winds (to SSW and SSE) to make it into a symmetric 12-wind compass (as Timosthenes would do), or subtract two winds (NNW and NNE) to make it into a symmetric 8-wind compass (as Eratosthenes would do).

=== Theophrastus ===
Theophrastus of Eresos, Aristotle's successor in the Peripatetic school, in his On Weather Signs and "On Winds" (c. 300 BCE), adopted the same wind system as Aristotle, with only some slight differences, e.g. Theophrastus misspelled Thrascias as "Thracias" and seemed to distinguish between Apractias and Boreas (perhaps as "North by west" and "North" wind respectively).

In the pseudo-Aristotelian fragment Ventorum Situs (often attributed to Theophrastus), there is an attempt to derive the etymology of the winds. As they are often named after a particular locality from where they seem to blow, different places in the Hellenistic world have come up with variant local names for the winds. In the list given in the Ventorum Situs:

- Boreas (N) is given the variant "Pagreus" in Mallus; no mention of Aparctias.
- Meses (NNE) is given the variant "Caunias" in Rhodes and "Idyreus" in Pamphylia;
- Caecias (NE) is called "Thebanas" in Lesbos, in some localities also called Boreas and Caunias.
- Apeliotes (E) is called "Potameus" in Tripoli (Phoenicia), "Syriandus" in the Gulf of Issus, "Marseus" in Tripoli (Libya), "Hellespontias" in Euboea, Crete, Proconnesus, Teos and Cyrene, "Berecyntias" in Sinope, and "Cataporthmias" in Sicily.
- Eurus (SE) is called "Scopelus" in Aegae and "Carbas" in Cyrene. Makes note that some also call it "Phonecias".
- Phonecias (SSE) is not mentioned by its old name but rather as Orthonotos, a new name which can be translated as the "true south wind".
- Notos (S) is said to be derived from "unhealthy" and "damp".
- Previously unnamed (SSW) is given a name for perhaps the first time, as Leuconotos, on account that it is a "sky-clearing" south wind,
- Lips (SW) is said to get its name from Libya,
- Zephyrus (W) is left unexplained,
- Argestes (NW) is cited by a new variant Iapyx (unexplained here; although in other writings, the name is connected to Iapyges in Apulia); it is also called "Scylletinus" in Tarentum, and elsewhere as "Pharangites" for Mount Pangaeus;
- Thrakias (NNW – note different spelling) is given the local variants "Strymonias" (in Thrace), "Sciron" (in Megaris), "Circias" (in Italy and Sicily, which later works will tie to the Mistral) and "Olympias" (in Euboea, Lesbos) (note: Aristotle gave Olympias as the variant of Argestes (NW)).

=== Timosthenes ===
The Greek-Roman physician Agathemerus (c. 250 CE), in his Geographia, gives the eight principal winds. But Agathemerus goes on to note that nearly five hundred years earlier, the navigator Timosthenes of Rhodes (c. 282 BCE) had developed a system of 12 winds by adding four winds to the eight. (Agathemerus is, of course, incorrect – Aristotle had at least ten winds, not eight).

Timosthenes's list (according to Agathemerus) was Aparctias (N), Boreas (not Meses, NNE), Caecias (NE), Apeliotes (E), Eurus (SE), "Phoenicias is also called Euronotos" (SSE), Notos (S), "Leuconotos alias Libonotos" (first mention, SSW), Lips (SW), Zephyrus (W), Argestes (NW) and "Thrascias alias Circius" (NNW).

Greek 12-wind rose (following Timosthenes)

In many ways, Timosthenes marks a significant step in the evolution of the compass rose. Depending on how Ventorum Situs is dated, Timosthenes can be credited with turning Aristotle's asymmetric ten-wind compass into a symmetric twelve-wind compass, by introducing the SSW wind (Leuconotos/Libonotos) omitted by Aristotle and Theophrastus and assigning the compound "Euronotos" (already alluded to by Aristotle, no mention of Theophrastus's Orthonotos here) in place of the local Phoenicias (SSE). His highlighting of the Italian "Circius" as a major variant of Thrascias (NNW) could be the first indication of the notorious Mistral wind of the west Mediterranean. Another major change in Timoesthenes is that he shunts Boreas out of the North position and into NNE (replacing Meses) – which will become customary in later authors.

Timosthenes is also significant for being perhaps the first Greek to go beyond treating these "winds" merely as meteorological phenomena and to begin viewing them properly as points of geographic direction. Timosthenes (through Agathemerus) assigns each of the 12 winds to geographical locations and peoples (relative to Rhodes):

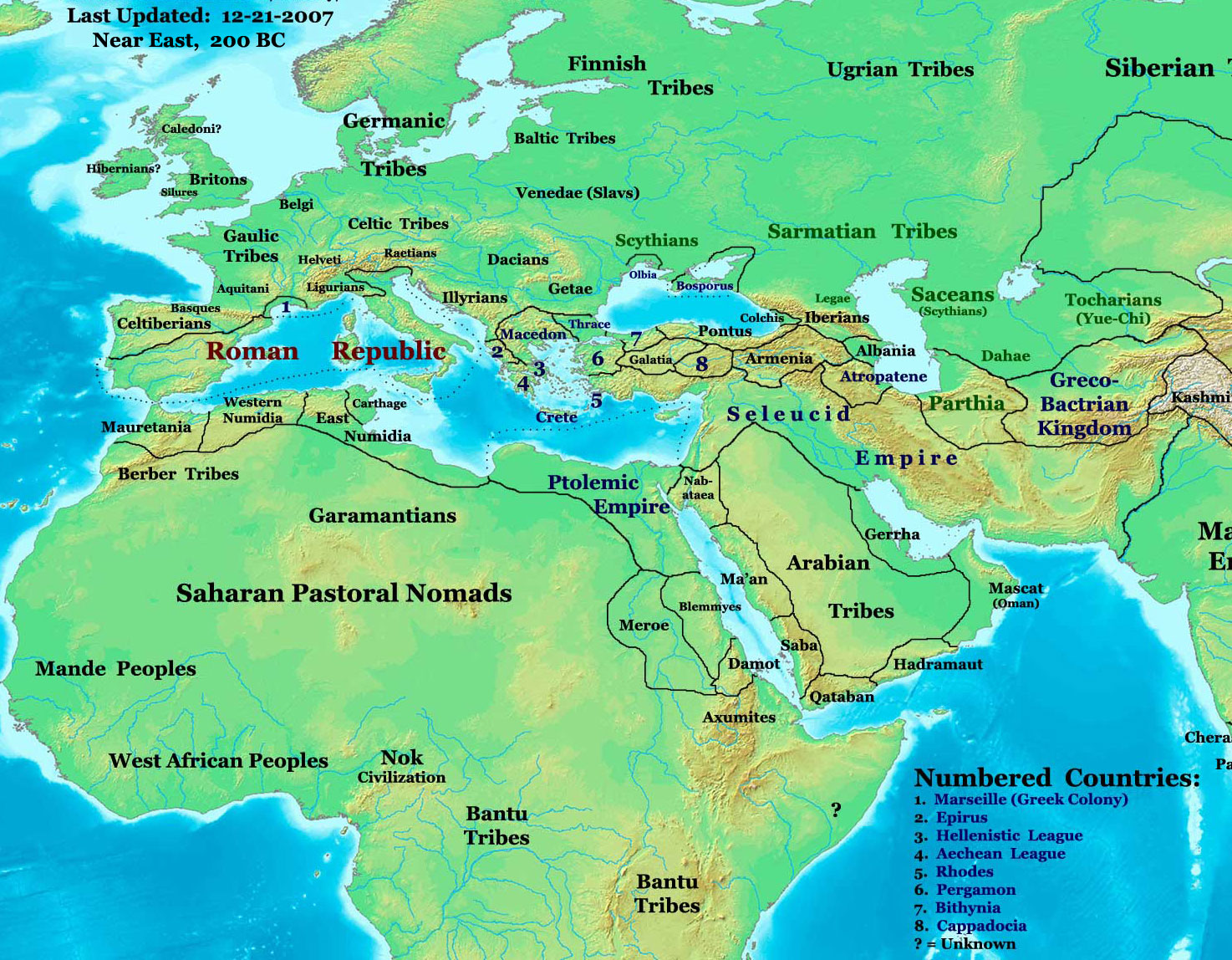
Ancient world, c. 200 BCE)

- Aparctias (N) are the "Scythians above Thrace",
- Boreas (NNE) are "Pontus, Maeotis and the Sarmatians"
- Caecias (NE) is "the Caspian Sea and the Sakas",
- Apeliotes (E) are "the Bactrians"
- Eurus (SE) are "the Indians",
- Phoenicias/Euronotos (SSE) is "the Red Sea and "Aethiopia" (prob.Axum)
- Notos (S) are the " "Aethiopians beyond Egypt" (Nubia)
- Leuconotos/Libonotos (SSW) are "the Garamantes beyond Syrtes",
- Lips (SW) are "the Ethiopians in the west beyond the Mauroi" (Numidia, Mauri people)
- Zephyrus (W) lie "the Pillars of Hercules and the beginning of Africa and Europe"
- Argestes (NW) is "Iberia or Hispania"
- Thrascias/Circius (NNW) are "the Celts".

Modern scholars to conjecture that Timosthenes, in his lost periplus, might have made ample use of these winds for sailing directions (which may help explain Agathemerus's eagerness to credit Timosthenes for "inventing" the twelve winds).

(Timosthenes's geographic list above is reproduced almost verbatim centuries later, in the 8th-century work of John of Damascus and a Prague manuscript from the early 1300s.)

The pseudo-Aristotelian work De Mundo (normally attributed to an anonymous copier of Posidonius, probably written between 50 BCE and 140 CE), the winds are named practically identically to Timosthenes (e.g. Aparctias alone in the North, Boreas shunted to NNE, Euronotus instead of Phoenicias, Circius as alternate of Thrascias). The differences of De Mundo from Timosthenes are that (1) it introduces Libophoenix as another name for Libonotos (Leuconotos not mentioned); (2) two alternates to Argestes are mentioned – Iapyx (as in the Ventorum) and Olympias (as in Aristotle) (Timosthenes mentions no variants for this wind), (3) like Aristotle, De Mundo refers to a collective of north winds, the Boreae.

=== Eratosthenes and the Tower of Winds ===
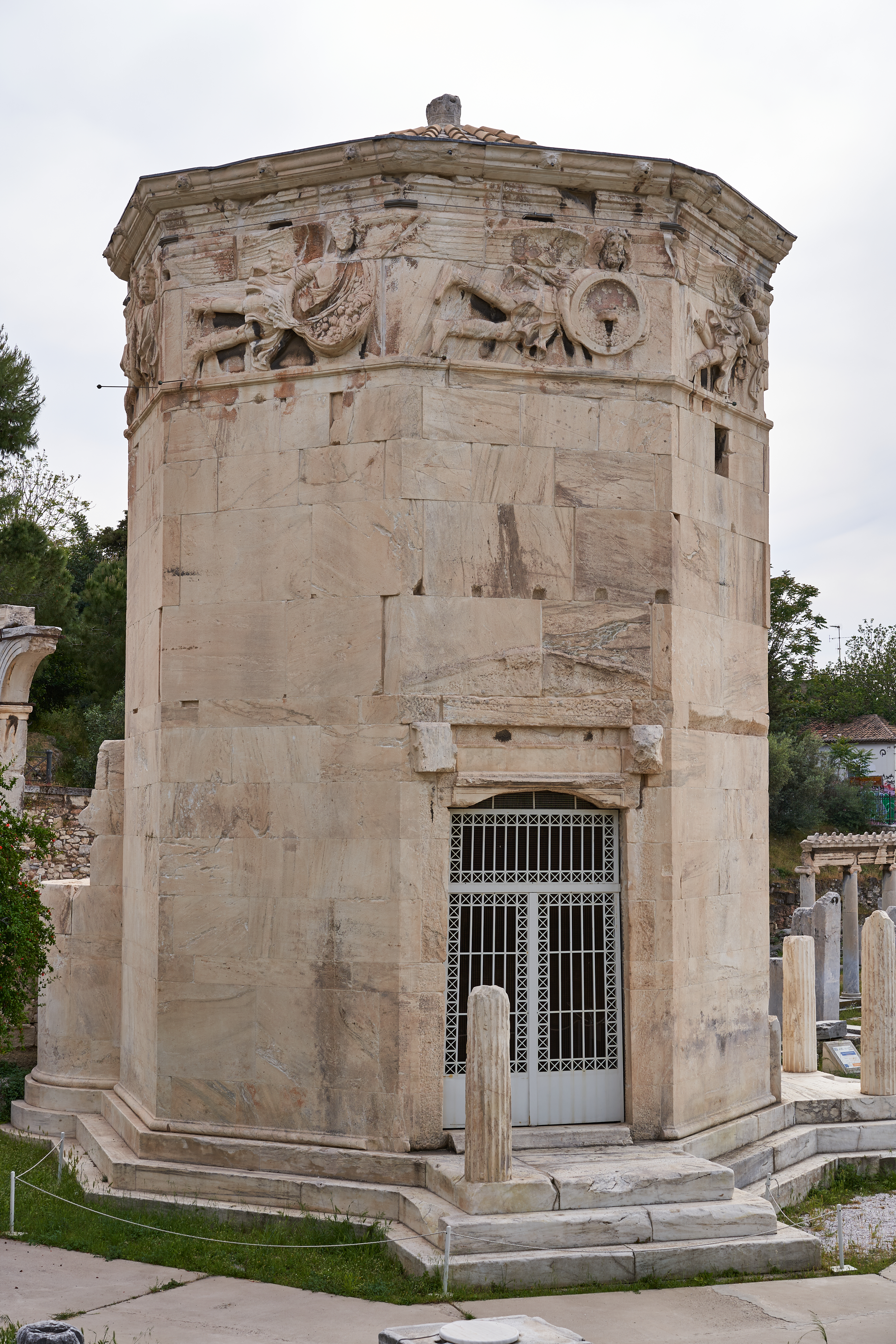
The Tower of the Winds, Athens

It is said that the geographer Eratosthenes of Cyrene (c. 200 BCE), realizing that many winds presented only slight variations, reduced twelve winds down to eight principal winds. Eratosthenes's own work has been lost, but the story is reported by Vitruvius, who goes on to say Eratosthenes came to this conclusion in the course of measuring the circumference of the earth, and felt there were really only eight equally sized sectors, and that other winds were but local variations of these eight principal winds. If true, that would make Eratosthenes the inventor of the eight-wind compass rose.

Eratosthenes was a disciple of Timosthenes and is said to have drawn principally from his work. But they part ways on this. Both recognized that Aristotle's ten-wind rose was unbalanced, but while Timosthenes restored balance by adding two winds to make it a symmetric twelve, Eratosthenes deducted two winds to make it a symmetric eight.

It seems that, in practical appeal, Eratosthenes's reduction may have won the day. The famous octagonal "Tower of the Winds" in Athens exhibits only eight winds rather than the ten of Aristotle or the twelve of Timosthenes. The tower is said to have been built by Andronicus of Cyrrhus, of uncertain dates. From the style of the sculptures the tower is usually dated around 50 BC, not long before Varro and Vitruvius mention it. An alternative possibility is that it was part of the generosity of Attalus III of Pergamon (d. 131 BC) who built the Stoa of Attalus in the city. Either way, it is after Eratosthenes.

It gives as its eight winds Boreas (not Aparctias, N), Caecias (NE), Apeliotes (E), Eurus (SE), Notos (S), Lips (SW), Zephyrus (W) and Sciron (NW, variant of Argestes). Boreas' reappearance in the North slot in place of Aparctias is notable. The winds are personified in stone reliefs as gods (Anemoi) at the top of the faces. Vitruvius says the tower was topped with a weather vane.

== Roman ==
The Greek wind system was adopted by the Romans, partly under their Greek nomenclature, but increasingly also under new Latin names. Roman poet Virgil, in his Georgics (c. 29 BCE) refers to several of the winds by their old Greek names (e.g. Zephyrus, Eurus, Boreas), and introduces a few new Latin names – notably, "black Auster", "cold Aquilo" and "frigid Caurus".

=== Seneca ===
The Roman writer Seneca, in his Naturales quaestiones (c. 65 CE), mentions the Greek names of some of the major winds, and goes on to note that Roman scholar Varro had said there were twelve winds. As given by Seneca, the Latin names of the twelve winds are:

Roman 12-wind rose (following Seneca)

North (N)	Septentrio	
North-Northeast (NNE)	Aquilo	
Northeast (NE)	Caecias	same as Greek
East (E)	Subsolanus	
Southeast (SE)	Vulturnus	with variant **Eurus** also used.
South-Southeast (SSE)	Euronotus	Same as Timosthenes
South (S)	Auster	with **Notus** used as variant
South-Southwest (SSW)	Libonotus	Same as Timosthenes
Southwest (SW)	Africus	
West (W)	Favonius	with variant **Zephyrus** also used.
Northwest (NW)	Corus	with variant **Argestes** also used
North-Northwest (NNW)	Thrascias	same as Greek.

(for the derivation of the Latin etymologies, see the section on Isidore of Seville below).

Oddly, Seneca says the meridian line arises from Euronotus (SSE), not Auster (S), and that the "highest" point in the north is Aquilo (NNE), not Septentrio (N). This might imply an awareness of magnetic declination, the difference between the magnetic north (compass north, in this case Aquilo) and the true north (Pole Star, Septentrio).

=== Pliny ===
Pliny the Elder in his Natural History (C. 77 CE) after noting that twelve was an exaggeration, goes on to note that the "moderns" have reduced it to eight. He lists them as Septentrio (N), Aquilo (NNE), Subsolanus (E), Vulturnus (SE), Auster (S), Africus (SW), Favonius (W) and Corus (NW).

Notice that Caecias (NE) is not part of this octet. Instead, Pliny puts the half-wind Aquilo (NNE) there instead. It seems Pliny is aware Aquilo is a half-wind, because since he says it lies "in between Septentrio and the summer sunrise" (although in a later chapter he places it at the summer sunrise). If the first version is taken, this means Pliny's eight-wind compass is asymmetric. Pliny goes on to mention that Aquilo is also "named Aparctias and Boreas" (the Boreas identification with NNE is already in Timosthenes, but Aparctias's demotion from the N is novel).

When he goes on to discuss half-winds, Pliny re-introduces Caecis as lying "between Aquilo and Subsolanus", thus restoring it effectively to its NE position. Evidently reading Aristotle, Pliny tries to insert long-lost Meses again "between Boreas (= Aquilo) and Caecis", thus placing Meses in a position that (in a modern 32-point compass) would be called "Northeast by north". Confusing matters, in a later chapter, Pliny goes on to say that Aquilo, in the summer, turns into the Etesian winds, the periodic wind already referred to by Aristotle. Pliny also mentions, for the other half-winds, Phoenicias (for SSE, not Euronotus), Libonotus (SSW), and Thrascias (NNW).

It is apparent Pliny had recently read Aristotle and sought to resurrect some of the abandoned Aristotelian names (Boreas/Aparctias, Meses, Etesian winds, Phoenicias, he even mentions Olympias and Sciron as local Greek winds), albeit they appear rather awkwardly when inserted into the contemporary 12-wind compass schema.

=== Aulus Gellius ===
In his Attic Nights (written c. 159), the Athens-raised Latin writer Aulus Gellius, possibly inspired by the Tower of the Winds in that city, reduces the Latin rose to from twelve to eight winds, the principal winds, for which he gives both the Latin and Greek terms. He lists them as:

- N – Septentrio (Latin), Aparctias (Greek)
- NE – Aquilo (Latin), Boreas (Greek)
- E – Eurus (Latin), Apeliotes (Greek), Subsolanus ("to Roman sailors")
- SE – Vulturnus (Latin), Euronotus (Greek)
- S – Auster (Latin), Notos (Greek)
- SW – Africus (Latin), Lips (Greek)
- W – Favonius (Latin), Zephyrus (Greek)
- NW – Caurus (Latin), Argestes (Greek)

Among the novelties is the disappearance of Caecias (NE, like in Pliny), although he does make a later note that "Caecias" is mentioned in Aristotle (but does not give it a position). Aquilo/Boreas seem well-enthroned at NE. Another surprise is the re-emergence of Eurus in the East, where it has not been seen since Homer. He seems to treat Eurus as a Latin name, giving the Aristotelian Apeliotes as the Greek equivalent, and reducing Subsolanus to a mere variant "from Roman sailors". With Eurus now absent in the SE, Euronotus (previously SSE) is promoted to the vacant SE position. Finally, a new name, Caurus, is introduced as the NW wind. This is almost certainly a misspelling of Corus (NW).

Aulus Gellius gives some information about local winds. He mentions Circius as a local wind in Gaul, known for its dizzying, circular motion, and notes its alternate spelling Cercius in Hispania (probably a reference to the Mistral) He also notes Iapyx (already mentioned, but first here explained as a local wind from Iapygia in Apulia) and periodic regional Etesian winds and the "Prodromi" (NW fore-winds, in Greek, πρόδρομοι).

=== Vatican table ===
The "Vatican table" is a marble Roman anemoscope (wind-vane) dating from the 2nd or 3rd Century CE, held by the Vatican Museums. Divided into twelve equal sides, on each of its sides, it has inscribed the names of the classical winds, both in Greek and in Latin. The Vatican table lists them as follows:

Wind	Latin inscription	Greek inscription	Greek read as:	Notes
N	Septentrio	ΑΠΑΡΚΙΑϹ	**Aparkias** (ἀπαρκίας)	Greek variant form.
NNE	Aquilo	ΒΟΡΕΑϹ	Boreas (βορέας)	as in Timosthenes
NE	**Vulturnus**	ΚΑΙΚΙΑϹ	Caecias (καικίας)	Vulturnus (normally SE) is in wrong place. This should be 'Caecias'.
E	**Solanus**	ΑΦΗΛΙΩΤΗϹ	**Apheliotes** (ἀφηλιώτης)	Greek variant form. New Latin name (normally Subsolanus).
SE	**Eurus**	ΕΥΡΟϹ	Eurus (εὖρος)	New Latin name. Vulturnus should be here.
SSE	**Euroauster**	ΕΥΡΟΝΟΤΟϹ	Euronotos (εὐρόνοτος))	New Latin name (normally Euronotus)
S	Auster	ΝΟΤΟϹ	Notos (νότος)	
SSW	**Austroafricus**	ΛΙΒΟΝΟΤΟϹ	Libonotos (λιβόνοτος)	New Latin name (normally, Libonotus)
SW	Africus	ΛΙΨ	Lips (λίψ)	
W	Favonius	ΖΕΦΥΡΟϹ	Zephyrus (ζέφυρος)	
NW	**Chorus**	ΙΑΠΥΞ	**Iapyx** (ἰᾶπυξ)	Latin name misspelled (normally Corus)
NNW	**Circius**	ΘΡΑΚΙΑϹ	**Thrakias** (θρακίας)	Greek misspelled, New Latin name (normally Thrascias), from Timosthenes

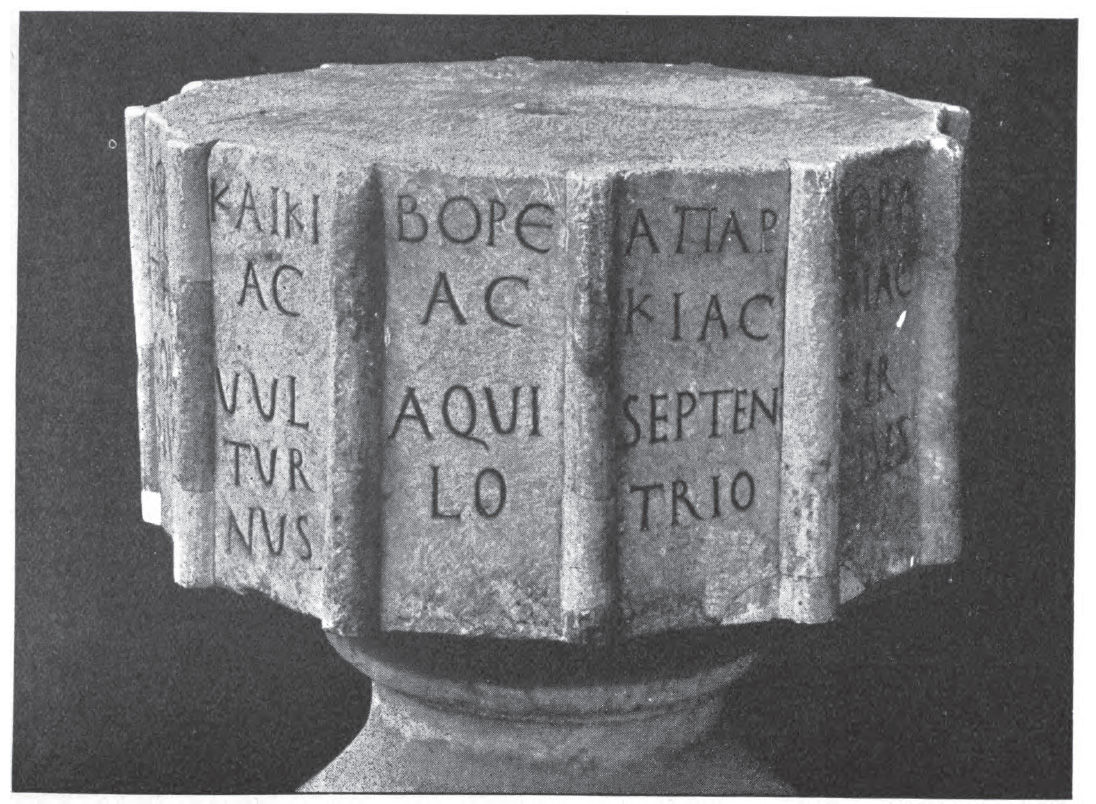
Vatican anemoscope ("table of the winds")

There are several spelling mistakes or variant forms, both in Greek (Aparkias, Apheliotes, Thrakias) and Latin (Chorus with an h, Solanus minus Sub). The principal error of the Vatican table is the misplacement of Vulturnus in NE rather than SE, with the result that the old Greek Eurus now resumes its place in Latin. This error will be repeated later. There is also a significant new Latin name, Austroafricus, in place of Libonotus, and Circius in place of Thrascias (although the latter was already anticipated by Timosthenes). The old "Iapyx" (of the Venturum Situs) also makes a comeback (in Greek).

=== Isidore of Seville ===
Centuries later, after the fall of Rome, Isidore of Seville set about compiling much of Classical knowledge in his Etymologiae (c. 620 CE). In the chapter on winds, Isidore provided a list practically identical to that of the marble Roman amenoscope held at the Vatican. Isidore also tried to supply the etymology of each of the terms:

- Septentrio (N) – Isidore relates it to the Arctic Circle ("circle of seven stars", i.e. the Ursa Minor). Septentrio can mean "commander of the seven", and the Pole Star is indeed the chief star of the Ursa Minor. An alternative etymology derives it from septem triones (seven plough-oxen), a reference to the seven stars of the Plough (Ursa Major).
- Aquilo (NNE) – Isidore relates it to water (acqua), because but probably from "aquilus", because it soaks up water from the ground. Pliny says the surface of the Earth "announces the approach" of Aquilo by drying, and the approach of Auster, by becoming moist "without any apparent cause". Alternative etymologies is that it derives from aquilus ("dark"), meaning either dark rainclouds (although it is not usually characterized as wet) or simply because it blows from the "land of darkness" (the far north)
- Vulturnus (NE) – (normally SE, but placed mistakenly by Isidore in the NE, as in the Vatican table). Isidore derives its etymology from alte tornat ("thundering high"). Earlier, Seneca said it was named after a battle (reported by Livy) in which the funneling wind threw dirt into the eyes of Roman soldiers and delivered their defeat. Both are almost certainly incorrect. It is probably an old local wind, named after the hills of Volturno, southeast of Rome. Others believe it related to vulsi ("demolisher", from vellere), because of its storminess. Volturno itself is named after "volvere" which meant "to roll" and is cognate with Spanish "volver" which means "to return".
- Subsolanus (E) – Isidore says it is from sub ortu solis ("from under the rising sun"). Concordant with Aulus Gellius, who further notes it is a name coined by Roman sailors.
- Eurus (SE) – from the Greek Eos (dawn)
- Euroauster (SSE) – compound of Eurus and Auster
- Auster (S) – Isidore derives it from "hauriendo aquas" (drawing up water), a reference to its humidity. First mentioned in Virgil as the "black Auster", which "saddens all the sky" with rain. Possibly related to "austerus" (harsh, hot) or to shine (from a light quarter).
- Austroafricus (SSW) – compound of Auster and Africus.
- Africus (SW) – Isidore deduces it correctly "from Africa", a direct translation of the Greek Lips ("from Libya").
- Favonius (W) – Isidore is probably correct in relating it to "favere", a favorable wind. He speaks of it as coming in the Spring, melting the winter frost and reviving vegetation and crops. It has also been related as a mild wind that cleared clouds and relieved the summer heat.
- Corus (NW) – Isidore spells it Corus and says it is the same as the Caurus (the "frigid Caurus" mentioned earlier by Virgil, but treated as distinct in Vitruvius). Isidore relates it to a 'chorus' of dancers, who "surround" heavy clouds and keep them in place. Aulus Gellius had already said something similar, but in reference to Caecias (a NE wind), not Corus. Others have related Corus to cover, conceal, because it relates to clouds, or perhaps the shower?
- Circius (NNW) – Isidore sees its circular or "bending" etymology and (perhaps a little confusingly) suggests its name is because it "bends into" Corus. Pliny and Aulus Gellius had already identified the Circius as the Mistral – Pliny calling it the violent wind of Narbonne, driving waves across to Ostia, while Aulus Gellius called it a local wind in Gaul, known for its dizzying, circular motion, and notes its alternate spelling Cercius in Hispania Isidore gives the Spanish name to be Gallicus, because it arises in Gaul.

=== Vitruvius's 24-wind rose ===
Chronologically, Vitruvius, who flourished in the late 1st century BCE, precedes all the Latin writers mentioned above: Seneca, Pliny, Aulus Gellius, etc. As such, his system of winds perhaps ought to be considered before the others. But Seneca quotes Varro as the source of his 12-wind system, and Varro wrote before Vitruvius. Moreover, Vitruvius's system is sufficiently distinct and peculiar to defy comparison with the others, and merits treatment in a special category all its own.

Vitruvius, in his De architectura (c. 15 BCE), makes a rather approving mention of Eratosthenes's reduction of the winds from twelve to eight principal winds. But Vitruvius then goes on to note there are many other winds, only slightly different from the core eight, which have been given names of their own in the past. In a rather hurried fashion, Vitruvius relates an ample list of two variations on either side of the eight principal winds, which yield a wind rose of 24 winds. Although the 24 winds might be easier to draw equally spaced at 15° from each other, they are easier to list using modern half- and quarter-wind notation. No insinuation about degrees should be read into either case (principal winds are in bold):

Roman 24-wind rose (following Vitruvius)

N	**Septentrio**
N by E	Gallicus
NNE	Supernas
NE	**Aquilo**
ENE	Boreas
E by N	Carbas
East	**Solanus**
E by S	Ornithiae (periodic)
ESE	Eurocircias
SE	**Eurus**
SSE	Vulturnus
S by E	Leuconotos
S	**Auster**
S by W	Altanus
SSW	Libonotus
SW	**Africus**
WSW	Subvesperus
W by S	Argestes
W	**Favonius**
W by N	Etesiae (periodic)
WNW	Circius
NW	**Caurus**
NNW	Corus
N by W	Thrascias

Many of the names in Vitruvius's list have appeared before elsewhere. Among the changes worth noting is the insertion of Gallicus (probably the Mistral) and Supernas (probably a local Alps lake breeze) in the very NE, nudging Aquilo (old NNE) to the NE (almost as in Pliny – perhaps the source of his confusion?). Old Boreas (now separate from Aquilo) is shunted further east – it has never been so far displaced from its ancient perch in the North. Caecias disappears from the NE altogether (although it appears on some enumerations of Vitruvius's list and will make a comeback with Seneca). Carbas, already noted as a Cyrene variant for the SE, is placed in the northeast quadrant. Latin Vulturnus is rightfully in the southeast, adjoining its Greek alternate Eurus. Greek Argestes is given here separately, adjoining Favonius in the west, albeit below its usual northwesterly quadrant. Leuconotos, previously a variant for Libonotus, is separated off and sent to the southeast quadrant (where Euronotos/Euroauster used to be, which seem to have disappeared altogether). There is nonetheless a similar-sounding Eurocircias nearby in the southeast, which might be the Biblical euroaquilo.

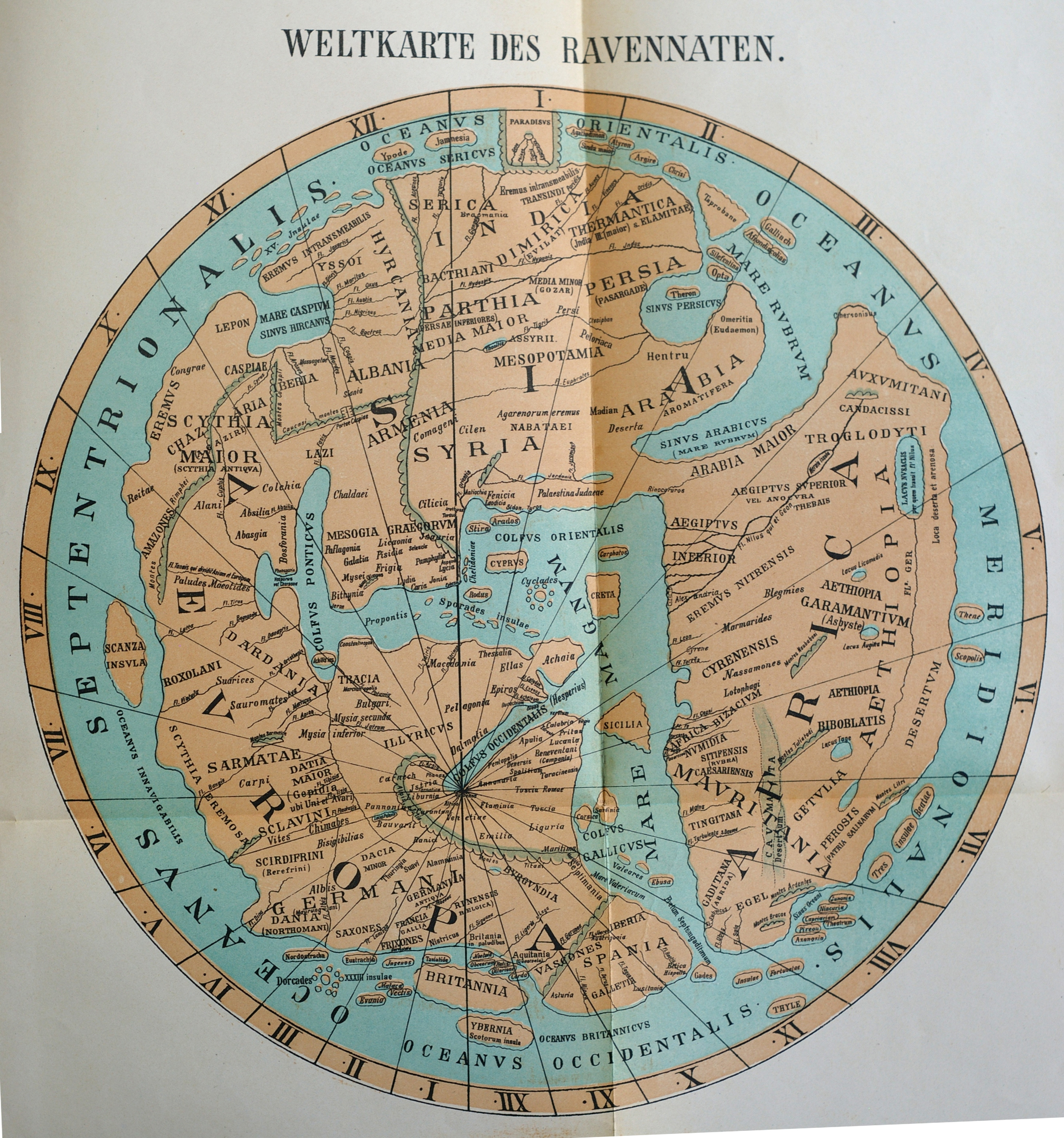
Reconstruction of a mappa mundi by an anonymous geographer from Ravenna, c. 650 CE, gridded by a 24-wind compass

Among other things worth noting, Solanus does not have its sub prefix and the wind Caurus (mentioned later by Aulus Gellius) is inserted between Corus and Circius (with old Thrascias given a separate position above that). Notice that Caurus and Corus are treated differently here, rather than one as just a misspelling of the other. Altanus is probably a local reference to a seaborne breeze.

Vitruvius's 24-wind list does not seem to have impressed later Roman writers (Seneca, Pliny, etc.), who all went back to 12- or 8-wind systems. Vitruvius's treatment has a touch of carelessness. He does not bother assigning Latin-to-Greek equivalents, give variants or provide any descriptions of the winds. It seems as if he is merely making a long list of all the wind names he has heard, giving each their own separate position in a single system, regardless of duplication. The shifts of some old Greek winds (Boreas, Eurus, Argestes, Leuconotos) into non-traditional positions (sometimes even in the wrong quadrant), could reflect the relative positions of Greece and Italy – or could simply indicate that Vitruvius did not much care for this exercise, and assigned their names roughly just to get a nice symmetric system of two off-winds for every principal wind. One can almost detect a touch of mockery in his construction, almost as if to ridicule elaborate wind systems that try to push beyond the basic eight winds.

Although usually ignored, Vitruvius's list of 24 winds re-emerged occasionally. Vitruvius's list of winds was articulated again in Georgius Agricola's De Re Metallica (1556). (Per happenstance, 24-point compasses were used in celestial astronomy and astrology and in Chinese geography, but these are unrelated to Vitruvius.)

== Medieval Transition ==
The Classical age ended with the struggle between the 12-wind rose and the 8-wind rose unresolved. Loosely speaking, it seemed as if classically minded geographers favored the 12-wind system, but those of more practical bent preferred the 8-wind system. As the Dark Ages advanced, it could be expected for the 8-wind rose to prevail, but the guardians of classical knowledge, such as St. Isidore of Seville, preserved the 12-wind system for posterity.

=== Charlemagne ===
The Frankish chronicler Einhard, in his Vita Karoli Magni (c. 830), claimed that Charlemagne himself adopted the classical 12-wind system, replacing the Greek-Latin names with an entirely new set of Germanic names of his own invention. Einhard's lists Charlemagne's nomenclature as follows (giving their equivalence to the Latin names in St. Isidore's list):

- (N) Nordroni
- (NNE) Nordostroni
- (NE) Ostnordroni
- (E) Ostroni
- (SE) Ostsundroni
- (SSE) Sundostroni
- (S) Sundroni
- (SSW) Sundvuestroni
- (SW) Vuestsundroni
- (W) Vuestroni
- (NW) Vuestnordroni
- (NNW) Nordvuestroni

Charlemagne's nomenclature resolves the half-wind dilemma (e.g. NNE vs. NE) by word order – Northeast and Eastnorth – giving neither a priority over the other (thus closer to NNE and ENE, with NE itself absent).

The Frankish suffix -roni means "running from" (similar to the modern English "-ern" in "Northern"). The etymology of Nord is uncertain (the suggestion from Sanskrit nara, water, might imply "rainy quarter", but this is speculative); Ost means "place of shining" (dawn, from the same Proto-Indo-European root that yielded the Greek Eos and Latin Auster), Sund, from "Sun-tha" meaning "the sunned place" and Vuest from Vues-tha meaning the "dwelling place" (as in, the place of rest at dusk, same root as Sanskrit vas, dwelling, and Latin vespera, evening)).

Charlemagne's nomenclature is clearly not the source of the modern cardinal directions (North, East, South, West) as found in most west European languages, both Germanic (German, Dutch, English, etc.) as well as Romance ones (French, Italian, Spanish, Portuguese).

=== Arab translators ===
In the Early Middle Ages, Arab scholars came into contact with the Greek works. Abu Yahya Ibn al-Batriq and Hunayn ibn Ishaq translated Aristotle's Meteorology, and scholars like Ibn Sinna and Ibn Rushd provided commentaries on it and expanded on it for their own systems.

The 9th-century pseudo-Olympiodorus's Commentary on Aristotle's Meteorology (translated by Hunayn ibn Ishaq) gave the following Arabic names for the 12 Greek winds:

- (N) šimāl
- (NNE) mis'
- (NE) nis'
- (E) şaban
- (SE) azyab
- (SSE) nu'āmā
- (S) janūb
- (SSW) hayf
- (SW) hur jūj
- (W) dabūr
- (NW) mahwa
- (NNW) jirbiyā

=== The Mariner's Windrose ===
The sudden emergence of Mediterranean portolan charts in the early 1300s, originally in Genoa, but soon in Venice and Majorca too, are believed to be constructed on the basis of sailing directions long written down in the piloting handbooks (portolani) of Mediterranean seafarers. The directions, maps and nautical magnetic compass, which emerged almost simultaneously, were articulated in an eight-point compass system, with the following names:

- (N) Tramontana
- (NE) Greco
- (E) Levante
- (SE) Scirocco
- (S) Ostro
- (SW) Libeccio or Garbino
- (W) Ponente
- (NW) Maestro

From these eight principal winds, 16-wind roses could be constructed with half-winds (NNE, ENE, etc.) which merely combined the names of the principal winds (e.g. NNE would be Greco-Tramontana, ENE Greco-Levante, and so on). 32-wind roses, which were already present in the early 1300s charts, relied on placing quarter-winds in between (the names of the quarter-winds were also just combinations of names of the principal winds (see Boxing the compass).

The eight compass winds are evidently from the Italian-tinged lingua franca in the Mediterranean Sea during the High and Late Middle Ages. Of the eight winds, only two can be traced to prior Classical winds – Ostra (S) from the Latin Auster, and Libeccio (SW) from the Greek Lips – but the others seem to be largely conceived autonomously.

Levante (rising, E) and Ponente (setting, W) are self-evidently related to the Sun's position, but are etymologically quite different from the classical terms (which might refer to lightness, darkness or the Sun itself, but none explicitly refer to the verbs rising or setting). Tramontana (N), Italianate for "over the mountains", most probably relates to the Alps of northern Italy, has nothing to do with the classical Aparctias-Septentrio (although it may have a faint connection with the old Greek Boreas, which lingered in Venetian parlance as the Bora of the Adriatic Sea). The Maestro is, as noted, the west Mediterranean Mistral, a wind already given in the Latin rose as Circius, but the name here is novel.

Two Arabic words stand out: Scirocco (SE) from the Arabic al-Sharq (east) and the variant Garbino (SW), from the Arabic al-Gharb (west) (both of which, incidentally, translate to rising and setting respectively). In addition, there is the puzzle of Greco (NE). As Greece lies to the southeast of Italy, this suggests strongly that the Greco wind was named in the south Mediterranean, most probably in 10th- or 11th-century Arab Sicily (Byzantine-held Calabria and Apulia was to the northeast of Arab Sicily). A substantial part of sailing knowledge acquired by the Medieval Italian seafarers came not from their Roman ancestors, but rather from Arab seafarers via Arab-Norman Sicily.

While sailors probably could not care less about the source, scholars trained in the classics of Isidore and Aristotle, were not so easily won over. The classical 12-wind rose was still being taught in the academies well into the 15th century, e.g. in Pierre d'Ailly's Ymago Mundo (using St. Isidore's version). Several scholastically constructed mappa mundi inserted the classical 12-winds. Among these, are the 8th-century Beatus of Liébana mappa mundi, the 10th-century Reichenau T-O map, the 12th-century 'Henry of Mainz' mappa mundi (c.1110), the 13th-century Ebstorf map, and the 14th-century Ranulf Higden world map. Many mariners' portolan charts tipped their hat to classical and clerical authority by inserting indicators of the 12 classical winds on their nautical charts – not, of course, on a compass rose, but rather cartographers might inscribe the names or initials of the classical winds on small colored disks or coins, scattering them along the edges of the map, well out of the way.

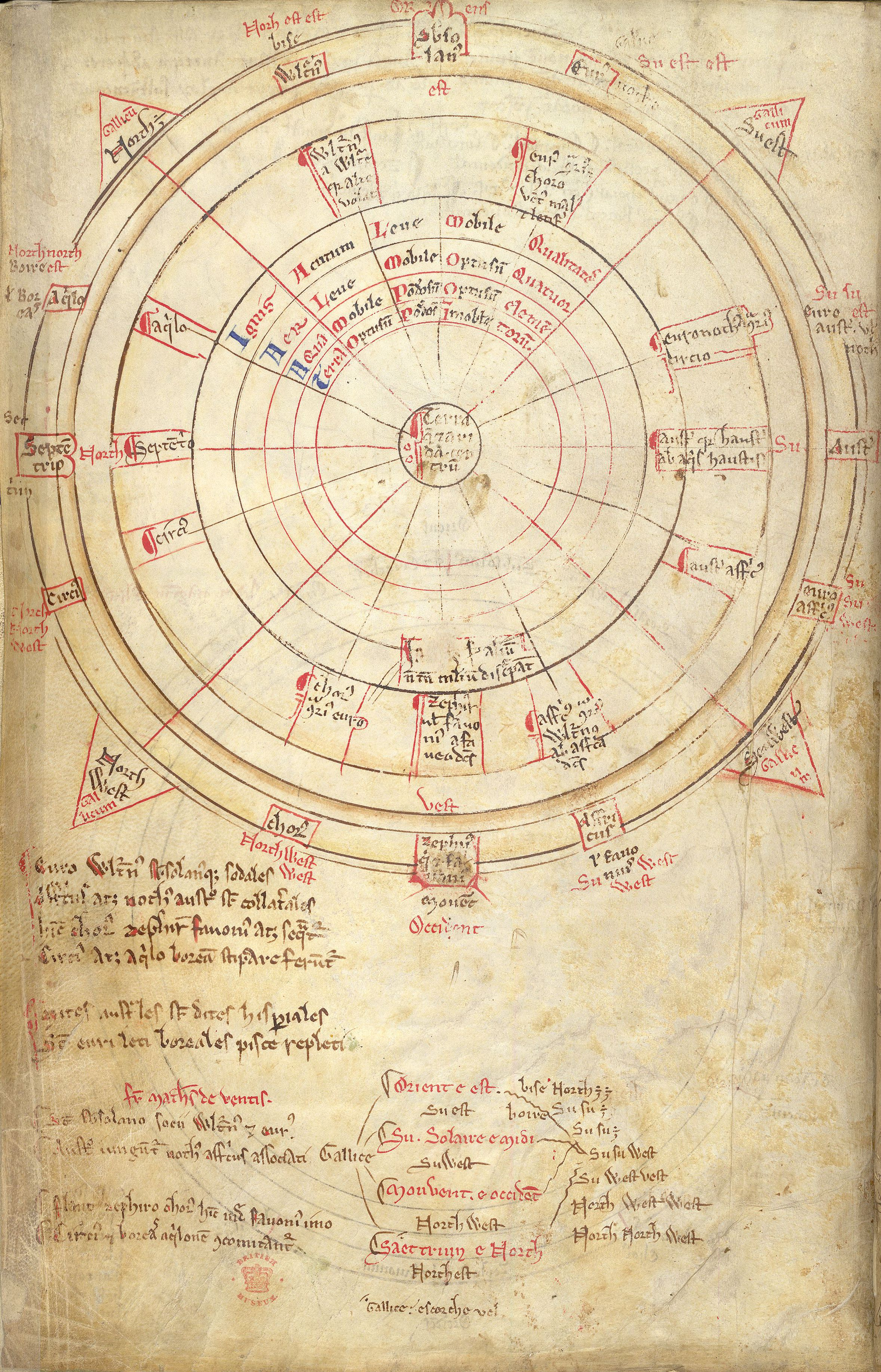
Attempt to fit the 12 classical winds on the 16-wind mariner's compass rose, by Matthew Paris, in his Liber Additamentorum (c. 1250)

As early as 1250, the English chronicler Matthew Paris attempted in his Liber Additamentorum to reconcile the classical 12 winds he was taught with the "new" Mediterranean wind rose. In one effort, Matthew Paris assigned the 12 classical names to N, E, S, W and the half-winds (NNE, ENE, ESE, etc.), leaving the principal diagonals NE, SE, SW and NW vacant. Thus Septentrio to N, Aquilo to NNE, Vulturnus to ENE, Subsolanus to E, Eurus to ESE, Euroauster to SSE, Auster to S, and so on. (Indeed, this assignment is frequently used by many authors (but not this article) to explain the classical 12-wind system in modern terms). In a second effort, he decided to conjure up 16 classical-sounding names for all 16 winds of the mariner's rose. In his construction (noted on a scribbled corner), he seemed to contemplate the following:

- (N) – Aquilo g.e. septentrio
- (NNE) – Boreas aquilonaris
- (NE) – Vulturnus borealis
- (ENE) – Boreas orientalis
- (E) – Subsolanus, calidus et siccus
- (ESE) – Eurus orientalis
- (SE) – Euro-nothus
- (SSE) – Euro-auster, Egipcius?
- (S) – Auster meridionalis
- (SSW) – Euroauster affricanus
- (SW) – Eurus procellosus
- (WSW) – Africus occidentalis
- (W) – Zephyrus blandus g.e. favonius
- (WNW) – Chorus occidentalis
- (NW) – Circius choralis
- (NNW) – Circius aquilonaris

But Paris did not go beyond jotting these names down on a corner of the manuscript.

In a note in his 1558 atlas, the Portuguese cartographer Diogo Homem made one final attempt to reconcile the classical twelve with the mariner's eight by assigning 8 of the 12 to the principal winds of the compass, and the remaining four to the half-winds NNW, NNE, SSE and SSW. In Homem's assignment:

- Septentrio = Tramontana (N)
- Aquilo or Boreas = Greco-Tramontana (NNE)
- Caecias or Hellespontus = Greco (NE)
- Subsolanus or Eurus = Levante (E)
- Vulturnus = Scirocco (SE)
- Euronotus = Ostro-Scirocco (SSE)
- Auster or Notus = Ostro (S)
- Libonotus = Ostro-Libeccio (SSW)
- Africus or Lips = Libeccio (SW)
- Favonius or Zephyrus = Ponente (W)
- Corus or Caurus = Maestro (NW)
- Circius = Maestro-Tramontana (NNW)

== Comparative table of classical winds ==
The following table summarizes the chronological evolution of the names of the winds in classical antiquity. Changes in name or position from the prior listing are highlighted in bold. Vitruvius's 24-wind list is omitted and does not fit the table.

Greek	N	NNE	NE	E	SE	SSE	S	SSW	SW	W	NW	NNW
Cardinal Points	**Arctos** (Ἄρκτος)			**Anatole** (Ἀνατολή)			**Mesembria** (Μεσημβρία)			**Dysis** (Δύσις)		
**Homer** (4-wind version)	**Boreas** (Βορέας)			**Eurus** (Εὖρος)			**Notos** (Νότος)			**Zephyrus** (Ζέφυρος)		
**Homer** (6-wind version)	Boreas		Eurus		Apeliotes		Notos		Agrestes		Zephyrus	
**Aristotle**	**Aparctias** or Boreas	**Meses**	**Caecias**	**Apeliotes**	**Eurus** or Euronoti	No wind (locally, **Phoenicias**)	Notos	No wind	**Lips**	Zephyrus	**Argestes**, (local **Olympias** or **Sciron**)	**Thrascias**
Aristotle (in Greek)	Ἀπαρκτίας, Βορέας	Μέσης	Καικίας	Ἀπηλιώτης	Εὖρος, Εὐρόνοτοι	(Φοινικίας)	Νότος		Λίψ	Ζέφυρος	Ἀργέστης, (Ὀλυμπίας, Σκίρων)	Θρασκίας
**Theophrastus**	Aparctias or Boreas	Meses	Caecias	Apeliotes	Eurus	(Phoenicias)	Notos		Lips	Zephyrus	Argestes	**Thrakias**
Ventorum Situs	Boreas	Meses	Caecias	Apeliotes	Eurus	**Orthonotos**	Notos	**Leuconotos**	Lips	Zephyrus	**Iapyx** or Argestes	**Thrakias**
**Timosthenes**	Aparctias	**Boreas**	Caecias	Apeliotes	Eurus	**Euronotos**	Notos	Leuconotos or **Libonotos**	Lips	Zephyrus	Argestes	Thrascias or **Circius**
De Mundo	Aparctias	Boreas	Caecias	Apeliotes	Eurus	Euronotos	Notos	Libonotos or **Libophoenix**	Lips	Zephyrus	Argestes or Iapyx, or Olympias	Thrascias or Circius
**Tower of the Winds**	**Boreas**		Caecias	Apeliotes	Eurus		Notos		Lips	Zephyrus	**Sciron**	
Roman	N	NNE	NE	E	SE	SSE	S	SSW	SW	W	NW	NNW
**Seneca**	**Septentrio**	**Aquilo**	Caecias	**Subsolanus**	**Vulturnus** or Eurus	Euronotus	**Auster** or Notus	Libonotus	**Africus**	**Favonius** or Zephyrus	**Corus** or Argestes	Thrascias
**Pliny**	Septentrio	Aquilo or **Boreas** or **Aparctias** (**Meses** at NW by N)	Caecias	Subsolanus	Vulturnus	**Phoenicias**	Auster	Libonotus	Africus	Favonius	Corus	Thrascias
**Aulus Gellius**	Septentrio; Aparctias		**Aquilo**; **Boreas**	**Eurus**; Apeliotes; Subsolanus	Vulturnus; **Euronotus**		Auster; Notus		Africus; Lips	Favonius; Zephyrus	**Caurus**; Argestes	
**Vatican Table**	Septentrio; **Aparkias** (Ἀπαρκίας)	Aquilo; Boreas (Βορέας)	**Vulturnus**; Caecias (Καικίας)	**Solanus**; **Apheliotes** (Ἀφηλιώτης)	**Eurus**; Eurus (Εὖρος)	**Euroauster**; Euronotos (Εὐρόνοτος)	Auster; Notos (Νότος)	**Austroafricus**; Libonotos (Λιβόνοτος)	Africus; Lips (Λίψ)	Favonius; Zephyrus (Ζέφυρος)	**Chorus**; **Iapyx** (Ἰᾶπυξ)	**Circius**; **Thrakias** (Θρακίας)
**Isidore of Seville**	Septentrio	Aquilo	Vulturnus	**Subsolanus**	Eurus	Euroauster	Auster	Austroafricus	Africus	Favonius	**Corus**	Circius
Medieval	N	NNE	NE	E	SE	SSE	S	SSW	SW	W	NW	NNW
Charlemagne	Nordroni	Nordostroni	Ostnordroni	Ostroni	Ostsundroni	Sundostroni	Sundroni	Sundvuestroni	Vuestsundroni	Vuestroni	Vuestnordroni	Nordvuestroni
Hunayn ibn Ishaq	šimāl	mis'	nis'	şaban	azyab	nu'āmā	janūb	hayf	hur jūj	dabūr	mahwa	jirbiyā
Diogo Homem	Tramontana	Greco-Tramontana	Greco	Levante	Scirocco	Ostro-Scirocco	Ostro	Ostro-Libeccio	Libeccio	Ponente	Maestro	Maestro-Tramontana

== See also ==
- Anemoi
- Cierzo, a wind in Spain. The name derives from cercius.
- Compass rose
- Boxing the compass

== Sources ==
Primary:

- Pierre d'Ailly (1410) Ymago Mundi (1930 French trans. E. Buron, Paris: Maisonnenve)
- Aulus Gellius (159 CE) Noctes Atticae, 1853 ed. Leipzig: Teubner, vol.1) (English: 1795 Below trans.The Attic nights of Aulus Gellius, London: Johnson vol.1)
- Agathemerus (c. 250 CE) Hypotyposis Geographiae in 1697 Geographica Antiqua, Leiden. p.178ff (For another version, see Geographiae Informatio in Müller (1861) Geographi Graeci Minores, vol. 2, Paris: Firmin-Didot p.471ff. See also Diller (1975).
- Anonymous (pseudo-Aristotle), De Mundo at Alexandrum, 1854 ed.Aristotelis Opera Omnia, Graece et Latine, Vol. 3, Paris: Firmin-Didot. p.627 (Engl. trans. E.S. Forster, 1914, in The Works of Aristotle vol. 3,online txt)
- Anonymous (pseudo-Aristotle), Ventorum Situs et Adpellationes, 1857 ed.Aristotelis Opera Omnia, Graece et Latine, Vol. IV Paris: Firmin-Didot. p.45-46. (Engl. trans. E.S. Forster, 1913, in The Works of Aristotle (vol. 6) online txt)
- Aristotle Meteorologia, 1854 ed.Aristotelis Opera Omnia, Graece et Latine, Vol. 3, Paris: Firmin-Didot. (p.588ff (Engl. E.B. Webster, online )(Engl. trans. E.S. Forster, 1914, in The Works of Aristotle vol. 3,online txt)
- Einhard (c. 830 CE) Vita Karoli Imperatoris (1882 ed., Freiburg: Mohr online; (S.E. Turner 1880 trans, Life of Charlemagne, New York: American Book Company. online)
- Georgius Agricola (1556) De re metallica 1657 edition, Basil: Konig. online (Hoover and Hoover 1912 translation, Mining Magazine, vol. 12. Reprinted Dover, 1950).
- Hesiod (c. 700 BCE) Theogonia (Paley ed. 1861, Epics of Hesiod, London: Bell online).
- Hippocrates, De aere, aquis et locis libellus, (Multi-language (Greek, Latin, French, English) translation, 1881 Hippocrates on Airs, Waters, Places. London: Wyman & Sons. online)
- Homer (c. 800 BCE) The Iliad (Greek & W.C. Green transl., 1884, London: Longmans, vol. 1, vol. 2)
- Homer (c. 800 BCE) The Odyssey (Bks I-XII, Greek & G.H. Palmer trans. 1895, Boston:Houghton Mifflin. online)
- Isidore of Seville (c. 620 CE), Etymologiarum, (Migne, 1850, editor, Patrologia: Sancti Isidori Hispalensis Episcopi opera omnia, vol.3 & 4, Paris. online (Eng. trans. P. Throop (2005) Isidore of Seville's Etymologies: Complete English Translation. Charlotte, Virginia: Medieval MS.)
- John of Damascus (8th century, CE) "Orthodoxou Pisteos/De Fide Orthodoxa" (As published in J.P. Migne, 1864, editors, Patrologiæ Graeca, vol. 94: Joannis Damascene. Paris. p.796ff
- Pliny the Elder (c. 77 CE) Naturalis Historiae. (Latin: Mayhoff ed., 1906, Leipzig: Teubner, vol. 1) (English: John Bostock and Henry Thomas Riley transl., 1855, The Natural History of Pliny. London: H.G. Bohn. vol 1. (Bks 1 – 5), vol.4 (Bks 18–23)
- Seneca the Younger (c. 65 CE) Naturales quaestiones, (Bks 1–7, 1819 ed., Göttingen: Vandenhoek. online(Trans., T. Lodge, 1620, Works, both Moral and Natural. London p.759ff)
- Strabo (c. 7 BCE) The Geography of Strabo (Hamilton and Falconer transl., 1856–57. London: Bohn. vol.1, vol.2, vol.3)
- Theophrastus (c. 300 BCE) De Signes and De Venti (J.G. Wood translation, 1894 in J.G. Wood and G.J. Symons, editor, Theophrastus of Eresus on Winds and Weather Signs. London: Stanford. online). For a different translation (with Greek text), "Concerning Weather Signs", in A. Hort trans. (Loeb edition), 1916,Theophrastus, Enquiry into Plants and Minor works on Odoùrs and Weather signs, Vol. II. p.391)
- Virgil (c. 29 BCE) Georgics (J.Martyn trans., 1811 ed., London: Dutton online)
- Vitruvius (c. 15 BCE) De Architectura Libri Decem (1892 ed., Leipzig: Holtze online) (M.H. Morgan 1914 translation as The Ten Books on Architecture, Cambridge, Mass: Harvard University Press. online)
- Müller, C.F.W. (1855–61) Geographi Graeci Minores. Paris: Firmin-Didot. vol.1, vol.2

Secondary:

- Aczel, A. D. (2001) The Riddle of the Compass: the invention that changed the world. New York: Harcourt.
- Brown, C.H. (1983) "Where do Cardinal Direction Terms Come From?", Anthropological Linguistics, Vol. 25 (2), p. 121-61.
- Brown, L.A. (1949) The Story of Maps. 1979 edition, New York: Dover.
- Bunbury, E.H. (1879) A History of Ancient Geography among the Greeks and Romans: from the earliest ages till the fall of the Roman Empire. New York: Murray. vol. 1, vol.2
- D'Avezac, M.A.P. (1874) Aperçus historiques sur la rose des vents: lettre à Monsieur Henri Narducci. Rome: Civelli online
- D'Avezac, M.A.P. (1888) "Le Ravennate et son exposé cosmographique", Bulletin de la Société Normande de Géographie. Rouen: Cagniard offprint
- Diller, A. (1975) "Agathemerus, Sketch of Geography", Greek, Roman and Byzantine Studies, Vol. 16, p. 60–66
- Falconer, T. (1811) "French Translation of Strabo" Quarterly Review, Vol. 5 (May), p.274-302
- Gosselin, M. (1805) "Observations préliminaires et générales", Géographie de Strabon, Vol. 1. Paris: Imperiale. online
- Humboldt, A.v. (1851) Cosmos: a sketch of a physical description of the universe London: Bohn. vol. 3
- Hutchison, G. (1843) A Treatise on the Causes and Principles of Meteorological Phenomena. Glasgow: Archibald & Fullarton. online
- Lais, P. Giuseppe (1894) "Monumento Greco-Latino di una Rosa Classical Dodecimale in Vaticano" Pubblicazioni della Specola Vaticana, vol. 4. Turin: Artigianelli. online
- Lettinck, P. (1999) Aristotle's 'Meteorology' and its reception in the Arab world: with an edition and translation of Ibn Suwār's 'Treatise on Meteorological Phenomena' and Ibn Bājja's 'Commentary on the Meteorology'. Leiden: Brill.
- Lorimer, W.L. (1925) Some Notes on the Text of pseudo-Aristotle "De Mundo" Oxford University Press.
- Malte-Brun, Conrad (1824) Universal Geography: Or a description of all parts of the world, Boston: Wells and Lilly. vol. 1, vol. 6
- Rosen, H.B. (1991) "Some Thoughts on the System of Designation of the Cardinal Points in Ancient Semitic Languages", in A.S. Kaye, editor, Semitic Studies: in honor of Wolf Leslau, Vol. II. Wiesbaden: Harrassowitz. p. 1337–44.
- Skeat, W.W. (1882)An Etymological Dictionary of the English language. Oxford: Clarendon. online
- Taylor, E.G. R. (1937) "The 'De Ventis' of Matthew Paris", Imago Mundi, vol. 2, p. 23–26.
- Thomson, J. Oliver (1948) History of Ancient Geography, Biblo & Tannen.
- Thompson, D'Arcy Wentworth (1918) "The Greek Winds", The Classical Review, Vol. 32 (3) p.49-55
- Uhden, R. (1936) "Die antiken Grundlagen de mittelalterlichen Seekarten", Imago Mundi, Vol. 1, (1935), pp. 1–19
- Valpy, F.E.J. (1852) A Manual of Latin Etymology as ultimately derived, with but few exceptions, from the Greek Language. 2nd ed., London: Longman. online
- Valpy, F.E.J. (1860) The Etymology of the words of the Greek language London: Longman, &tc. online
- Ward, C.R. (1894) "Current Notes: Names of the Winds", American Meteorological Journal, Vol. 11, p.67-69
- Wood, J.G. (1894) "Introduction and Appendix on the Number, Direction and Nomenclature of the Winds in Classical and Later Times" in Wood and Stanford, editors, Theophrastus of Eresus on Winds and Weather Signs. London: Stanford. p.77-97
