= The Situations and Names of Winds =

Spurious work attributed to Aristotle

The Situations and Names of Winds (Ancient Greek: Περὶ θέσεως ἀνέμων; Latin: Ventorum Situs) is a spurious fragment traditionally attributed to Aristotle. The brief text lists winds blowing from twelve different directions and their alternative names used in different places. According to the manuscript version of the work, The Situations and Names of Winds is an extract from a larger work entitled On Signs (De Signis) likely written by a pseudo-Aristotle of the peripatetic school. Situations is notable as an ancient text which reproduces the concepts of the Anemoi or "wind gods" and classical compass winds, both of which have been historical components of western culture.

== Synopsis ==
Situations is the shortest piece traditionally attributed to Aristotle as part of the Corpus Aristotelicum, occupying a single two-column page (973) in Bekker's standard reference edition of Aristotle's complete works.

The twelve winds, described in order in the text, are:

- Boreas (N)
- Meses (NNE)
- Caecias (NE)
- Eurus (E)
- Apeliotes (SE)
- Orthonotus (SSE)
- Notus (S)
- Leuconotus (SSW)
- Lips (SW)
- Zephyrus (W)
- Iapyx (NW)
- Thracias (NNW)

In addition to these primary names, the document also gives partial information on other traditional names for the same winds, and geographic associations tied to various places.

Although the document usually provides geographic context as opposed to cardinal directions, it is clear by comparing its scheme to other classical accounts that the listing starts in the north, and proceeds clockwise. In particular, the scheme presented in Situations is very similar to, but distinct from, the one given by Aristotle in his authentic text, Meteorology. A significant difference between the two texts is that Situations introduces the names Orthonotus and Leuconotus for the two southerly winds not treated in Meteorology. For another treatment of the text, see the "Theophrastus" section in the classical compass winds article, listed below.

The winds, as represented in Aristotle's Meteorology. Note that most, but not all names, agree with those given in Situations.

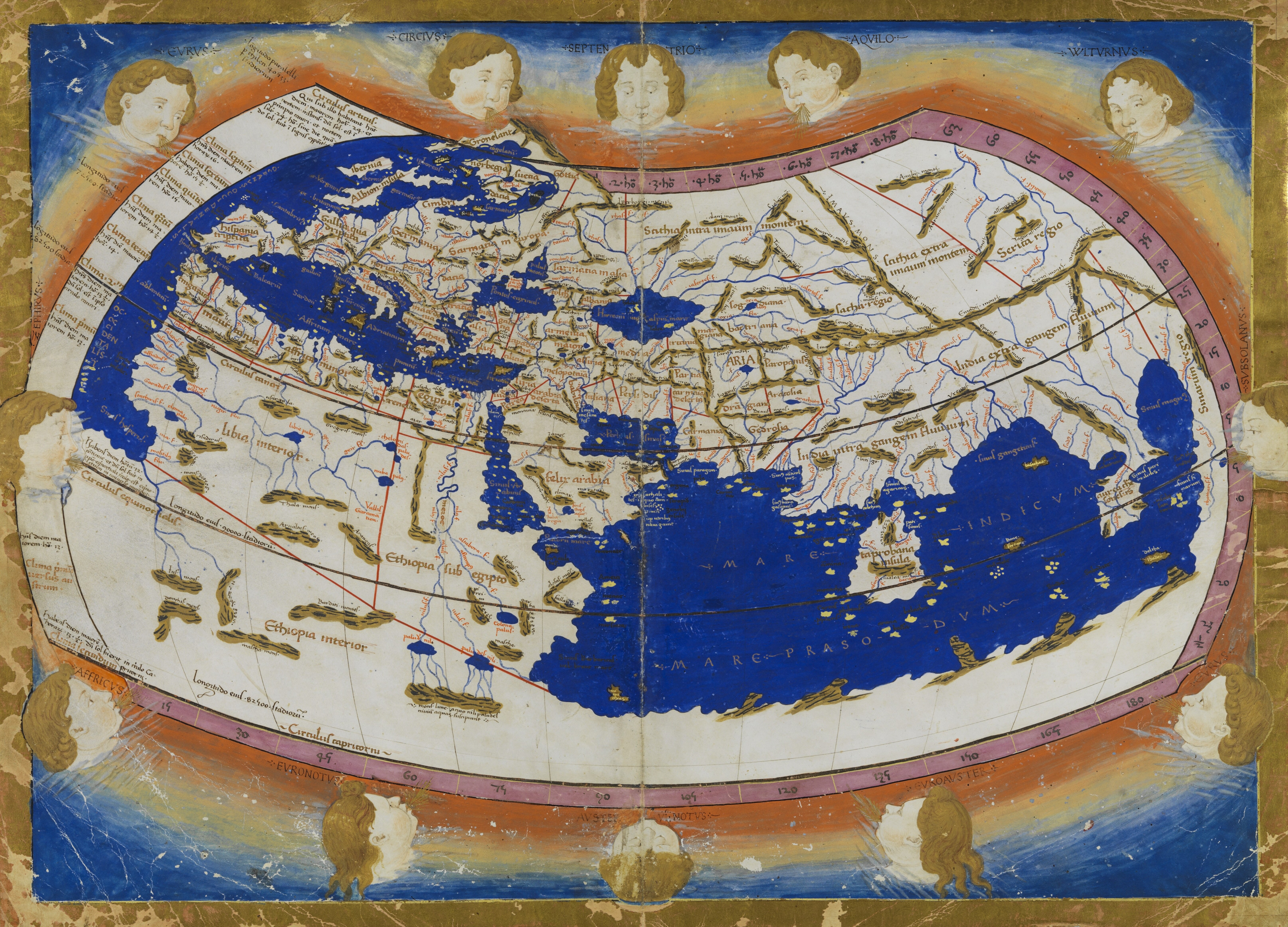
Nicolaus Germanus's 1467 manuscript copy of Ptolemy's world map. Note the Romanized names of the winds, very different from those stated in Situations, but in the same cultural tradition.

== See also ==
- Bekker numbering
- Classical compass winds (Theophrastus)
- Classical compass winds (Aristotle)
- Corpus Aristotelicum
- Meteorology (Aristotle)
