= Anemoi =

Group of Greek gods

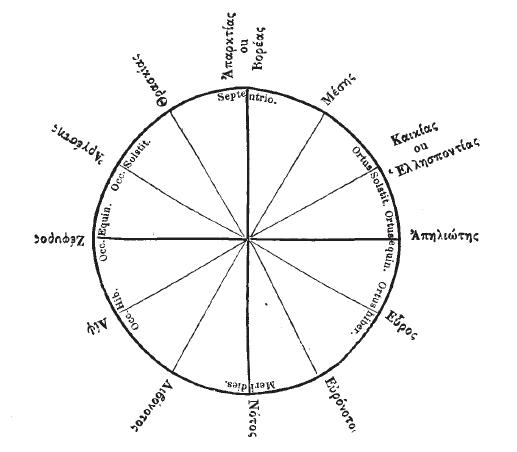
Wind rose of ancient Greece, created by the scholar Adamantios Korais around 1796

In ancient Greek religion and myth, the Anemoi (Ancient Greek: Ἄνεμοι, lit. 'Winds') were wind gods who were each ascribed a cardinal direction from which their respective winds came (see Classical compass winds), and were each associated with various nature, seasons and weather conditions. They were the progeny of the goddess of the dawn Eos and her husband, the god of the dusk, Astraeus.

== Etymology ==
The earliest attestation of the word in Greek and of the worship of the winds by the Greeks, are perhaps the Mycenaean Greek word-forms 𐀀𐀚𐀗𐀂𐀋𐀩𐀊, a-ne-mo-i-je-re-ja, 𐀀𐀚𐀗𐄀𐀂𐀋𐀩𐀊, a-ne-mo,i-je-re-ja, i.e. "priestess of the winds". These words, written in Linear B, are found on the KN Fp 1 and KN Fp 13 tablets.

== Mythology ==
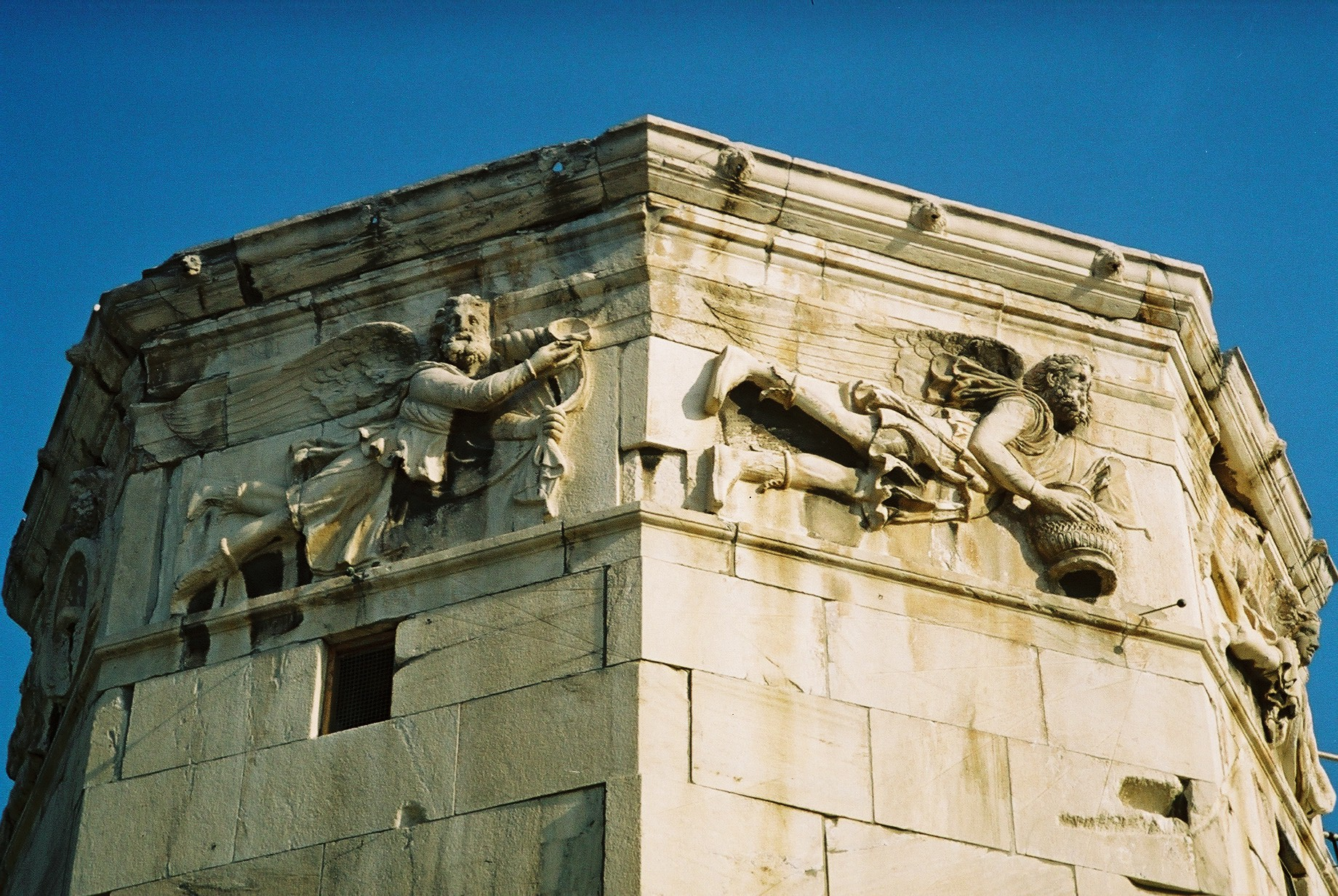
Tower of the Winds in ancient Athens, part of the frieze depicting the Greek wind gods Boreas (north wind, on the left) and Skiron (northwesterly wind, on the right)

The Anemoi are minor gods and are subject to Aeolus. They were sometimes represented as gusts of wind, and at other times were personified as winged men. They were also sometimes depicted as horses kept in the stables of the storm god Aeolus, who provided Odysseus with the Anemoi in the Odyssey. The Spartans were reported to sacrifice a horse to the winds on Mount Taygetus. Astraeus, the astrological deity (sometimes associated with Aeolus), and Eos/Aurora, the goddess of the dawn, were the parents of the Anemoi, according to the Greek poet Hesiod.

Of the four chief Anemoi, Boreas (Aquilo in Roman mythology) is the north wind and bringer of cold winter air, Zephyrus (Favonius in Latin) is the west wind and bringer of light spring and early-summer breezes, and Notus (Auster in Latin) is the south wind and bringer of the storms of late summer and autumn; Eurus, the southeast (or according to some, the east) wind, was not associated with any of the three Greek seasons, and is the only one of these four Anemoi not mentioned in Hesiod's Theogony or in the Orphic Hymns.

The deities equivalent to the Anemoi in Roman mythology were the Venti (Latin, "winds"). These gods had different names, but were otherwise very similar to their Greek counterparts, borrowing their attributes and being frequently conflated with them. Ptolemy's world map listed 12 winds: Septentrio (N), Aquilo (NNE), Vulturnus (NE), Subsolanus (E), Eurus (SE), Euroauster (SSE), Austeronotus (S), Euronotus (SSW), Africus (SW), Zephirus (W), Eurus (NW), Circius (NNW).

=== Boreas ===
Boreas is the god of the north wind and the harshest of the Anemoi. He is mostly known for his abduction of the Athenian princess Orithyia, by whom he became the father of the Boreads. In art, he is usually depicted as a bearded, older man. His Roman equivalent is called Aquilo.

=== Zephyrus ===
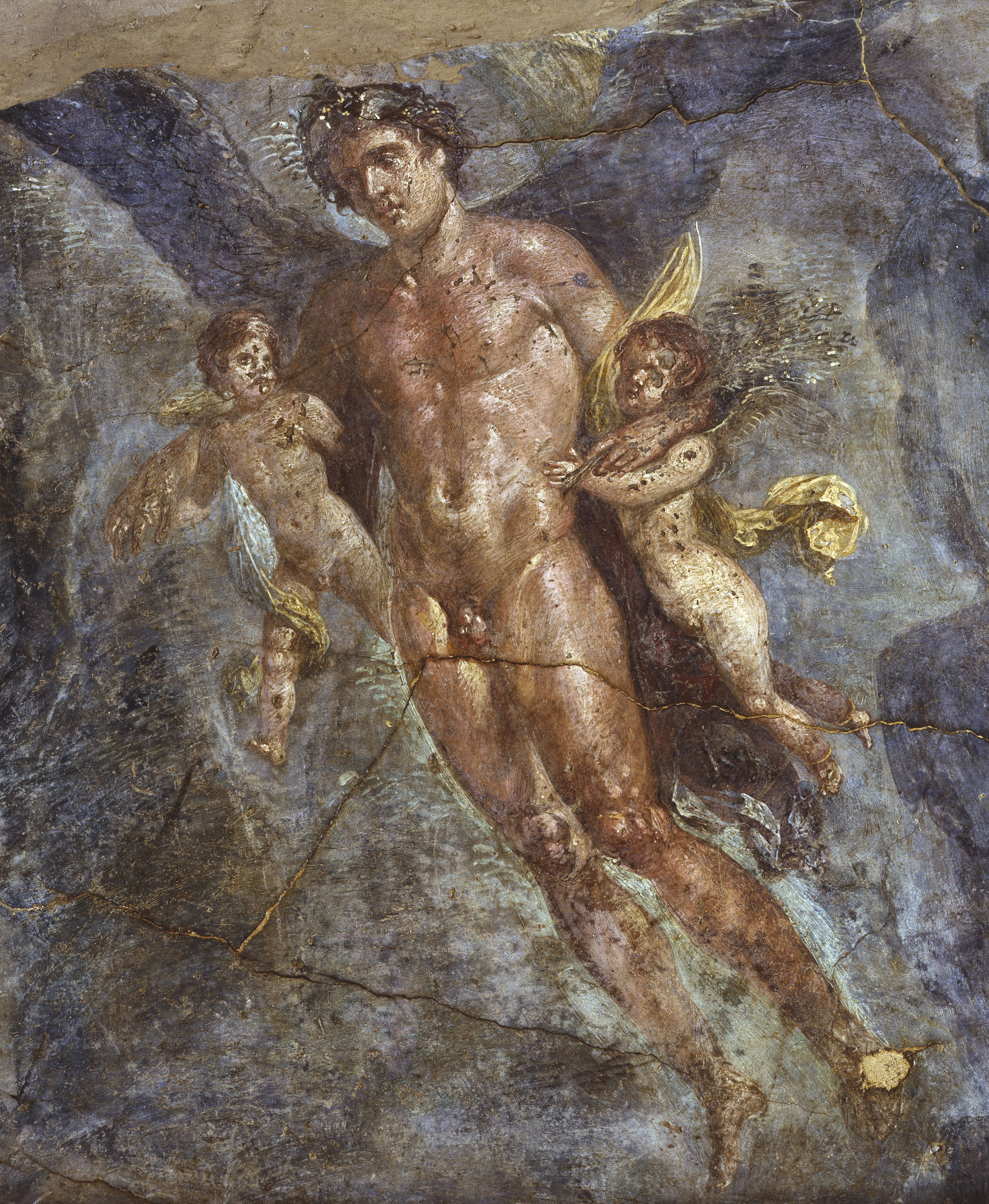
Zephyrus on an antique fresco in Pompeii

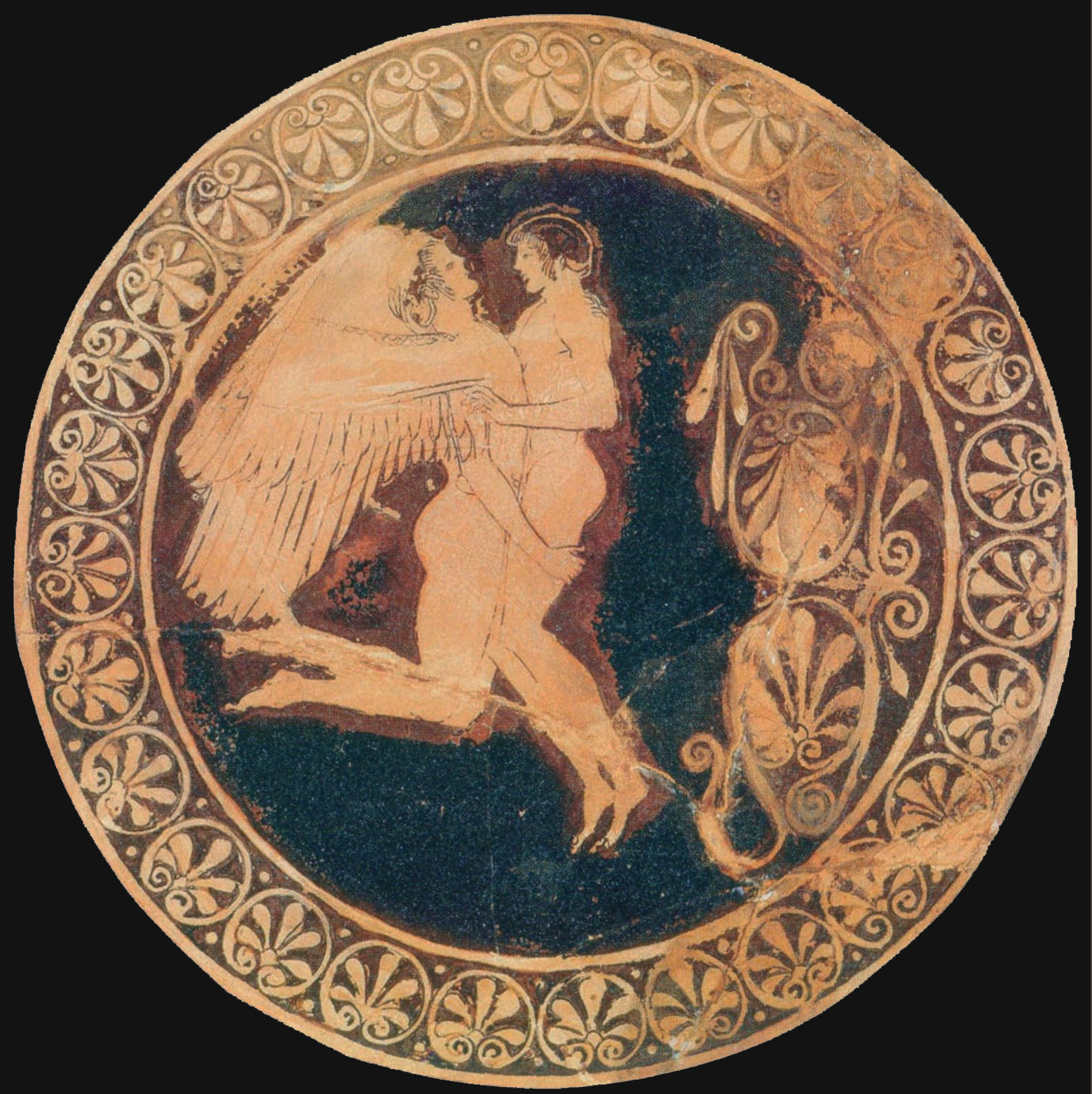
Zephyrus and Hyacinth; Attic red-figure cup from Tarquinia, c. 480 BCE, Museum of Fine Arts, Boston

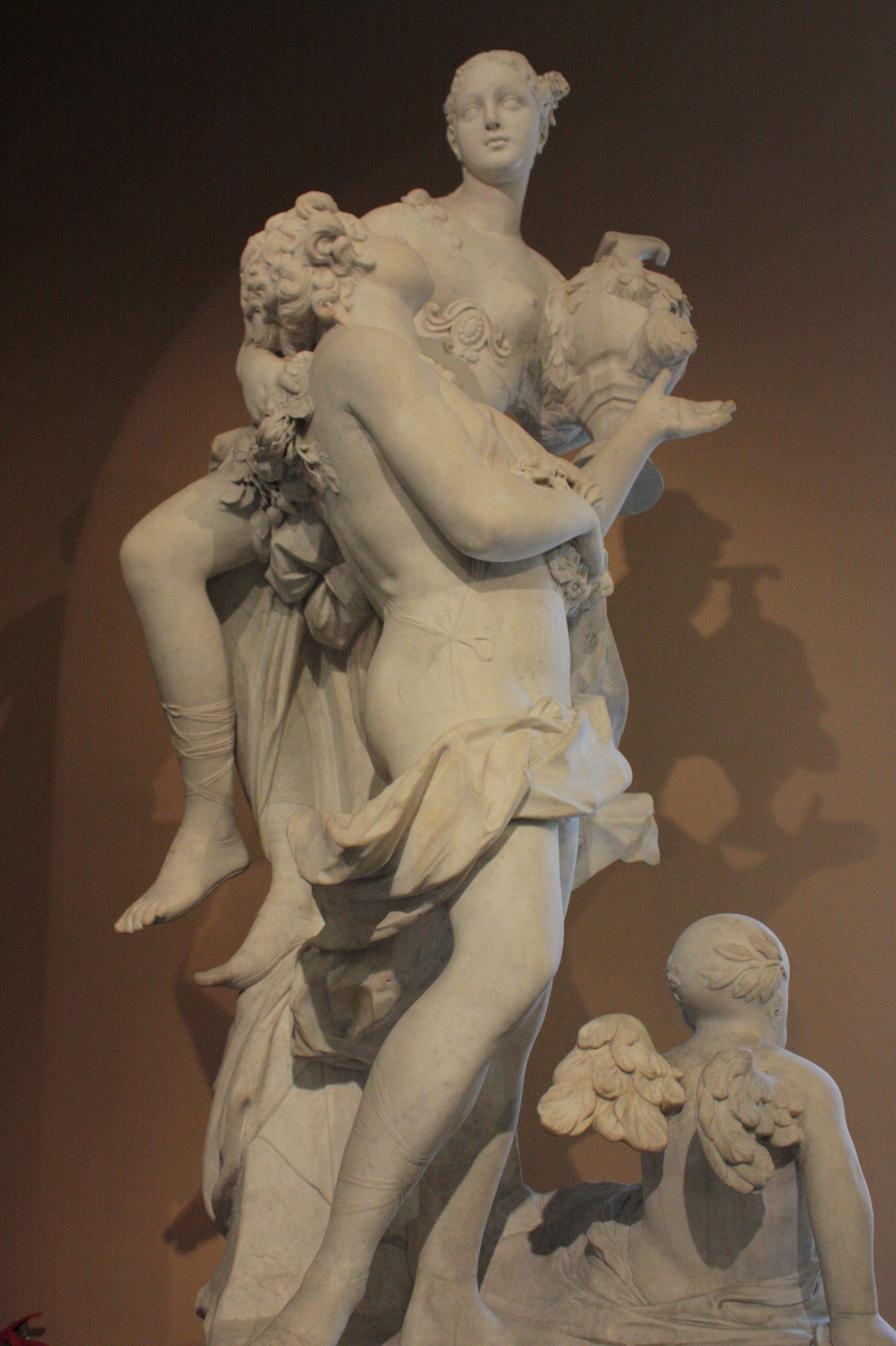
Zephyr and Flora, c. 1720, by Antonio Corradini, Victoria and Albert Museum

Zephyrus (Gk. Ζέφυρος [Zéphyros]), sometimes shortened in English to Zephyr, is the Greek god of the west wind. The gentlest of the winds, Zephyrus is known as the fructifying wind, the messenger of spring. It was thought that Zephyrus lived in a cave in Thrace.

Zephyrus was reported as having several wives in different stories. He was said to be the husband of Iris, goddess of the rainbow. He abducted the goddess Chloris, and gave her the domain of flowers. With Chloris, he fathered Karpos ('fruit'). He is said to have vied for Chloris's love with his brother Boreas, eventually winning her devotion. Additionally, with yet another sister and lover, the harpy Podarge (also known as Celaeno), Zephyrus was said to be the father of Balius and Xanthus, Achilles' horses.

In the story of Eros and Psyche, Zephyrus served Eros (or Cupid) by transporting Psyche to his abode.

Zephyrus was also claimed to have killed one of Apollo's many male lovers Hyacinth out of jealousy. Hyacinth was killed by a discus thrown by Apollo. Though according to some sources, his death was said to be an accident, others said that Zephyrus was the true culprit, having blown the discus off course.

=== Notus ===
Notus (Νότος, Nótos) was the Greek god of the south wind. He was associated with the desiccating hot wind of the rise of Sirius after midsummer, was thought to bring the storms of late summer and early autumn, and was feared as a destroyer of crops.

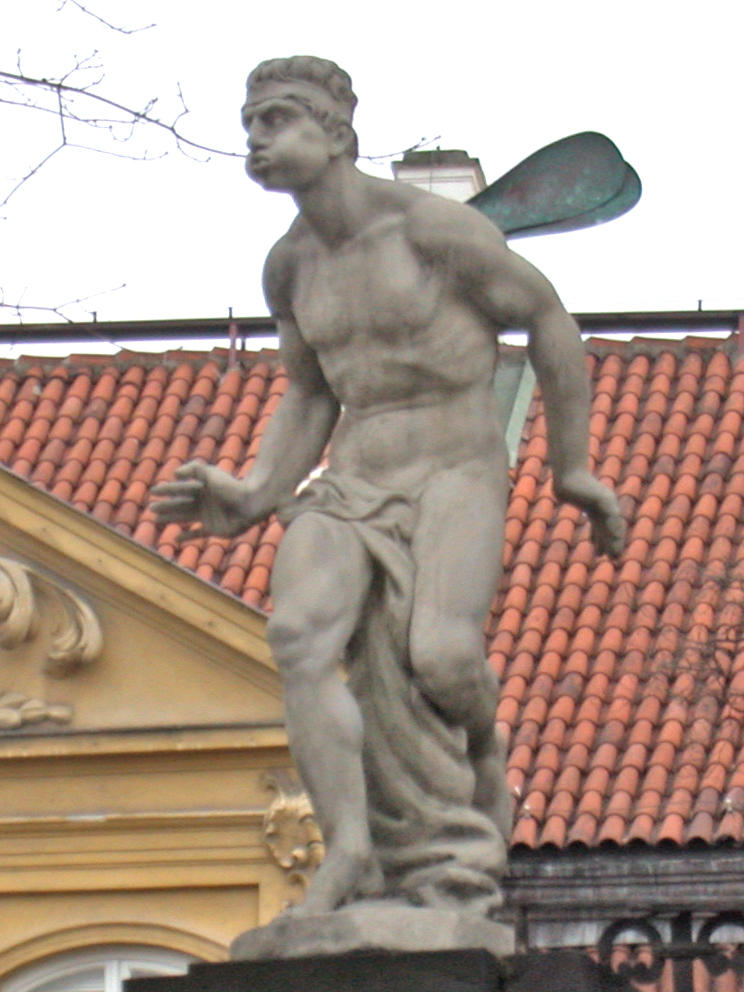
A statue of Notus

Notus' equivalent in Roman mythology was Auster, the embodiment of the sirocco wind, a southerly wind which brings cloudy weather, powerful winds and rain to southern Europe. Auster is related to names such as the compass point Australis and the country names Austria and Australia.) The Auster winds are mentioned in Virgil's Aeneid Book II, lines 304–307:

in segetem veluti cum flamma furentibus Austris incidit,
aut rapidus montano flumine torrens
sternit agros, sternit sata laeta boumque labores,
praecipitesque trahit silvas

Translation:

Just as when a flame falls on the standing grain while the South Winds rage,
or a rushing mountain stream lays low the fields,
lays low the glad crops and labors of oxen,
and drags down forests headlong.

Another Roman poet, Tibullus 1.1, lines 47–48, speaks of the pleasure of lying in bed on rainy winter days:

aut, gelidas hibernus aquas cum fuderit Auster,
securum somnos igne iuvante sequi

Translation:

or when the winter South Wind has poured out his cold waters,
to fall asleep carefree with the help of a fire.

The name Australia (the "southern land") is derived from Auster.

=== Eurus ===
Eurus (Εὖρος, Euros) according to some was the southeast wind, but according to others the east wind. On the Tower of the Winds in Athens, Eurus occupies the southeast side, while Apeliotes is in the east. However, it is widely accepted that Eurus is the east wind, while Apeliotes is the southeast wind.

Eurus' Roman counterpart is Vulturnus, according to Pliny the Elder; but for Aulus Gellius Volturnus was the equivalent of the southeast wind Euronotus. In the Latin poems, the name Eurus is generally used for the east or southeast wind, as in Greek.

Eurus is a wind of storm, described as a turbulent wind during storms and tossing ships on the sea. He is referred to as the "savior of Sparta" in a Homeric paean, or poem. Eurus is also called the "hot wind" by Nonnus in Dionysiaca. Eurus is closely related to Helios in passages of the Dionysiaca, being called from his place near Helios' palace, Phaethon, where the sun rose in the east.

== Lesser winds ==
Four lesser wind deities appear in a few ancient sources, such as at the Tower of the Winds in Athens:

Kaikias (or Caecius) is the Greek deity of the northeast wind. He is shown on the monument as a bearded man with a shield full of hailstones.

Apeliotes (or Apheliotes; the name means 'from the (rising) sun') is the Greek deity of the southeast wind. As this wind was thought to cause a refreshing rain particularly beneficial to farmers, he is often depicted wearing high boots and carrying fruit, draped in a light cloth concealing some flowers or grain. He is clean-shaven, with curly hair and a friendly expression. Because Apeliotes is a minor god, he was often syncretized with Eurus, the east wind. The Roman counterpart of Apeliotes is Subsolanus.

Skiron was the name used in Athens for the wind which blew from the Scironian rocks (a geographical feature near Kineta to the west of Athens). On the Tower of the Winds, however, he appears on the northwest side. His name is related to Skirophorion, the last of the three months of spring in the Attic calendar. He is depicted as a bearded man tilting a cauldron, representing the onset of winter. His Roman counterpart is Caurus or Corus. Caurus is also one of the oldest Roman wind-deities, and numbered among the di indigetes ('indigenous gods'), a group of abstract and largely minor numinous entities. The Roman poet Virgil writes when describing steppe winter weather near the Sea of Azov:

Semper hiemps, semper spirantes frigora cauri

Translation:

Always winter, always the northwest winds breathing cold

Lips is the Greek deity of the southwest wind, often depicted holding the stern of a ship. His Roman equivalent was Africus, due to the Roman province Africa being to the southwest of Italy. This name is thought to be derived from the name of a North African tribe, the Afri.

Friezes on the Clocktower of Andronicus Cyrrhestes (Tower of the Winds)
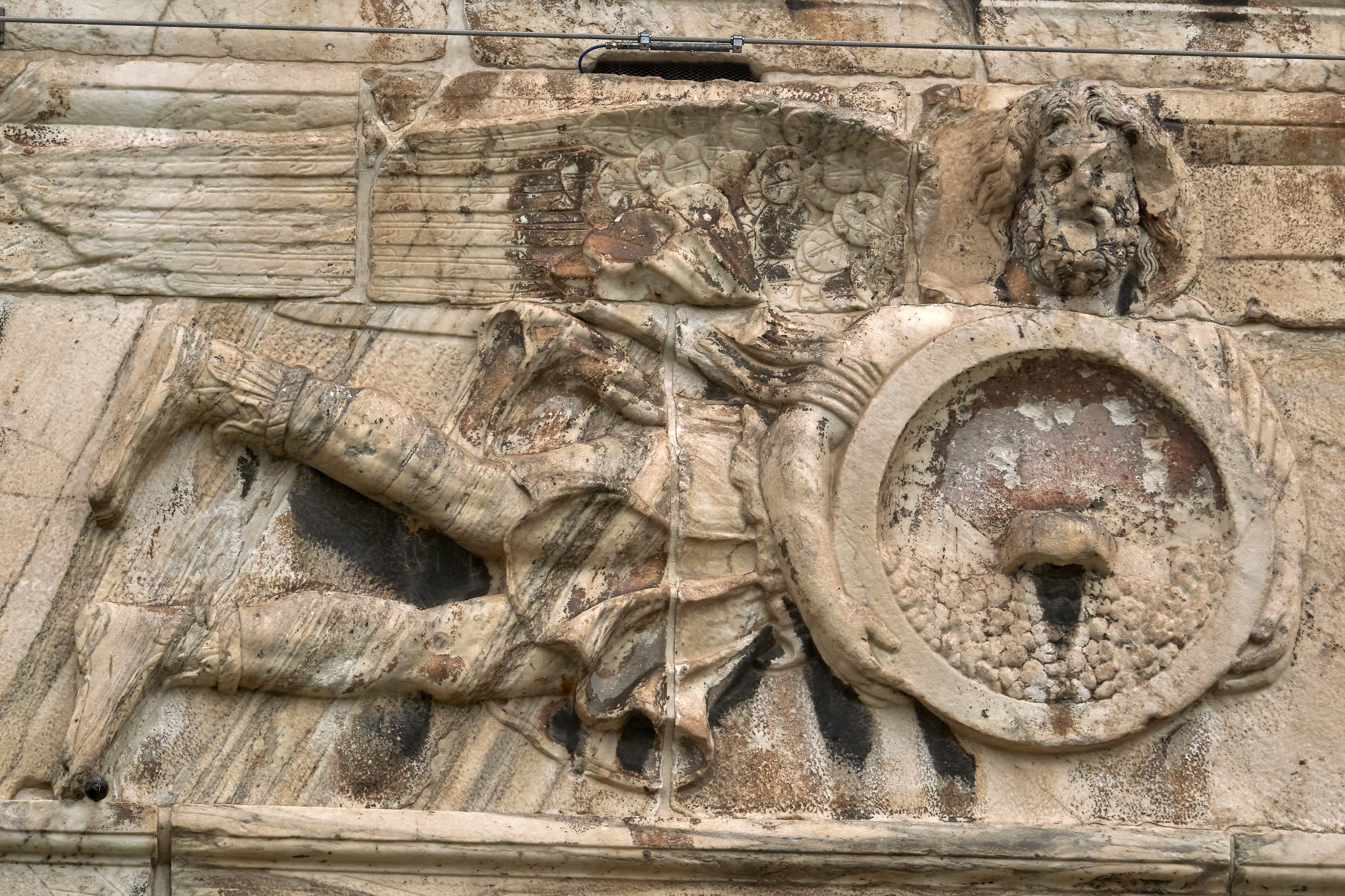
Kaikias

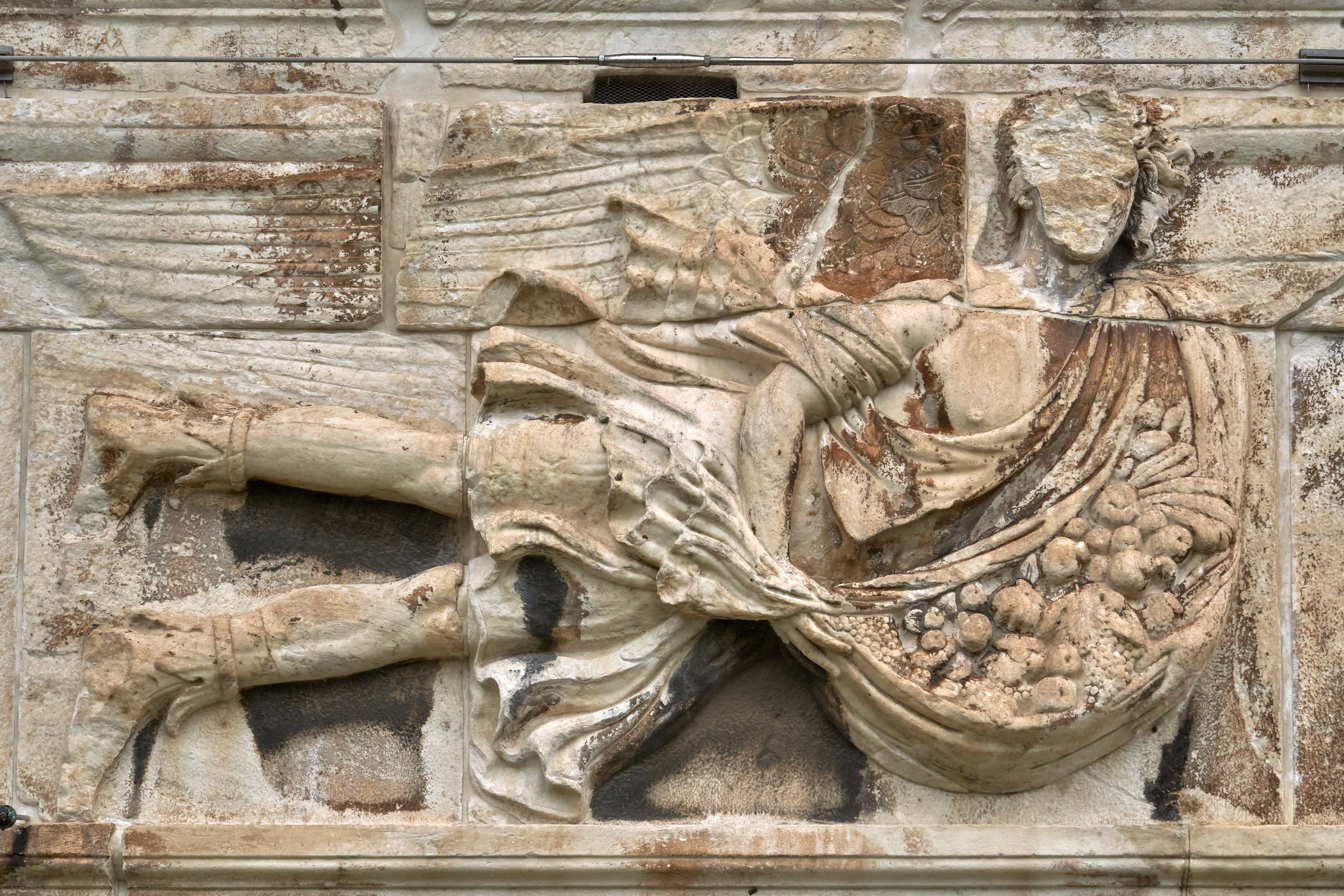
Apeliotes

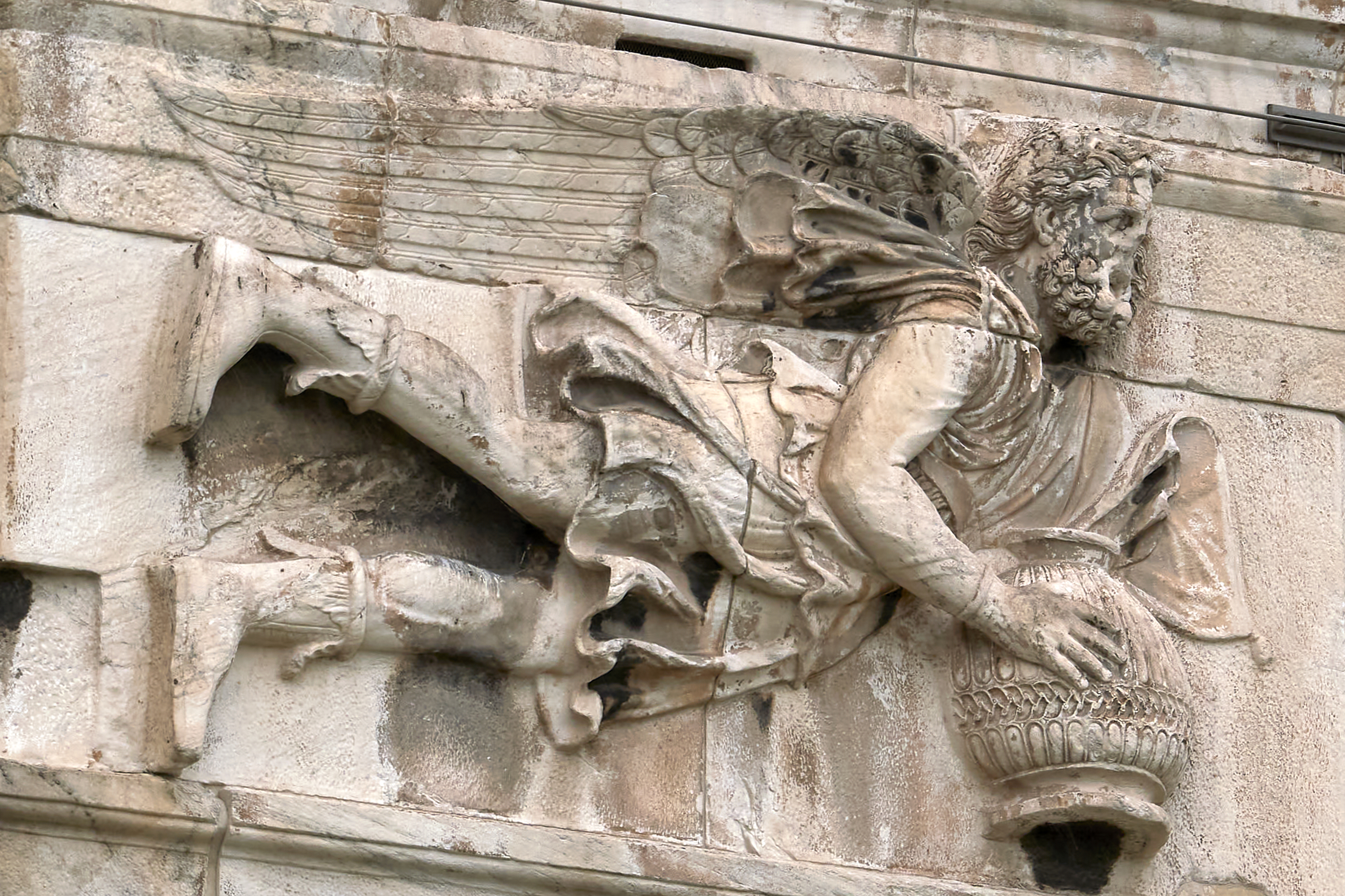
Skiron

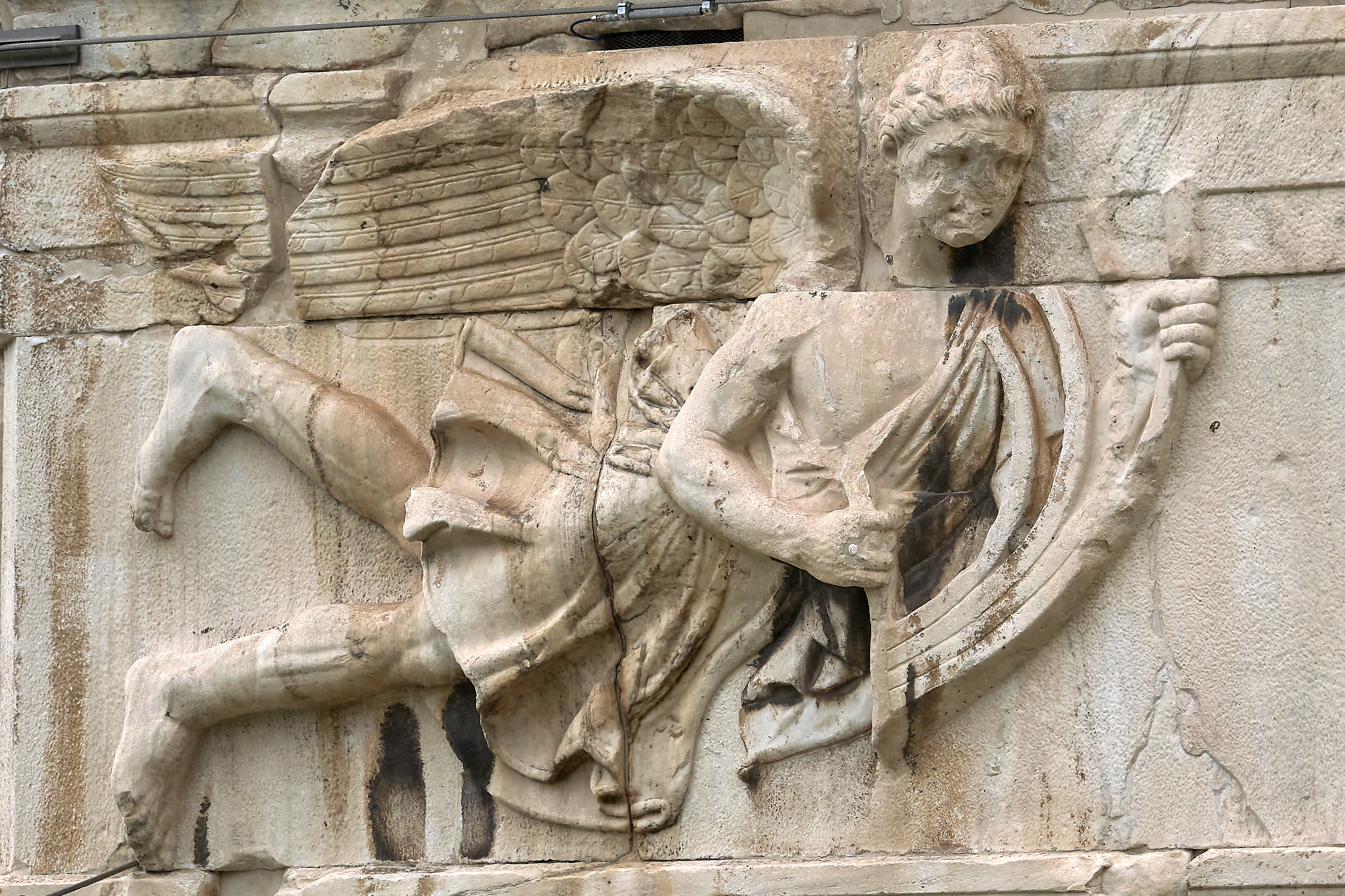
Lips

Other minor wind deities included:

- Argestes "clearing", a wind blowing from about the same direction as Skiron (Caurus), and probably another name for it
- Aparctias, sometimes called the north wind instead of Boreas
- Thrascias, the north-northwest wind (sometimes called in Latin Circius)
- Euronotus, the wind blowing from the direction, as its name suggests, between Euros and Notus, that is, a south-southeast wind (Euroauster to the Romans)
- Iapyx, the northwest wind about the same as Caurus. It was this wind, according to Virgil, that carried the fleeing Cleopatra home to Egypt after she was defeated at the battle of Actium.
- Libonotus, the south-southwest wind, known as Austro-Africus to the Romans
- Meses, another name for the northwest wind
- Olympias, apparently identified with Skiron/Argestes
- Phoenicias, another name for the southeast wind ('the one blowing from Phoenicia', due to this land lying to the southeast of Greece)

== See also ==
- Anemometer, modern device to measure wind
- Bacab
- Dáinn, Dvalinn, Duneyrr and Duraþrór
- Norðri, Suðri, Austri and Vestri
- Vayu
- List of wind deities
