= Periplus of Pseudo-Scylax =

Ancient Greek periplus

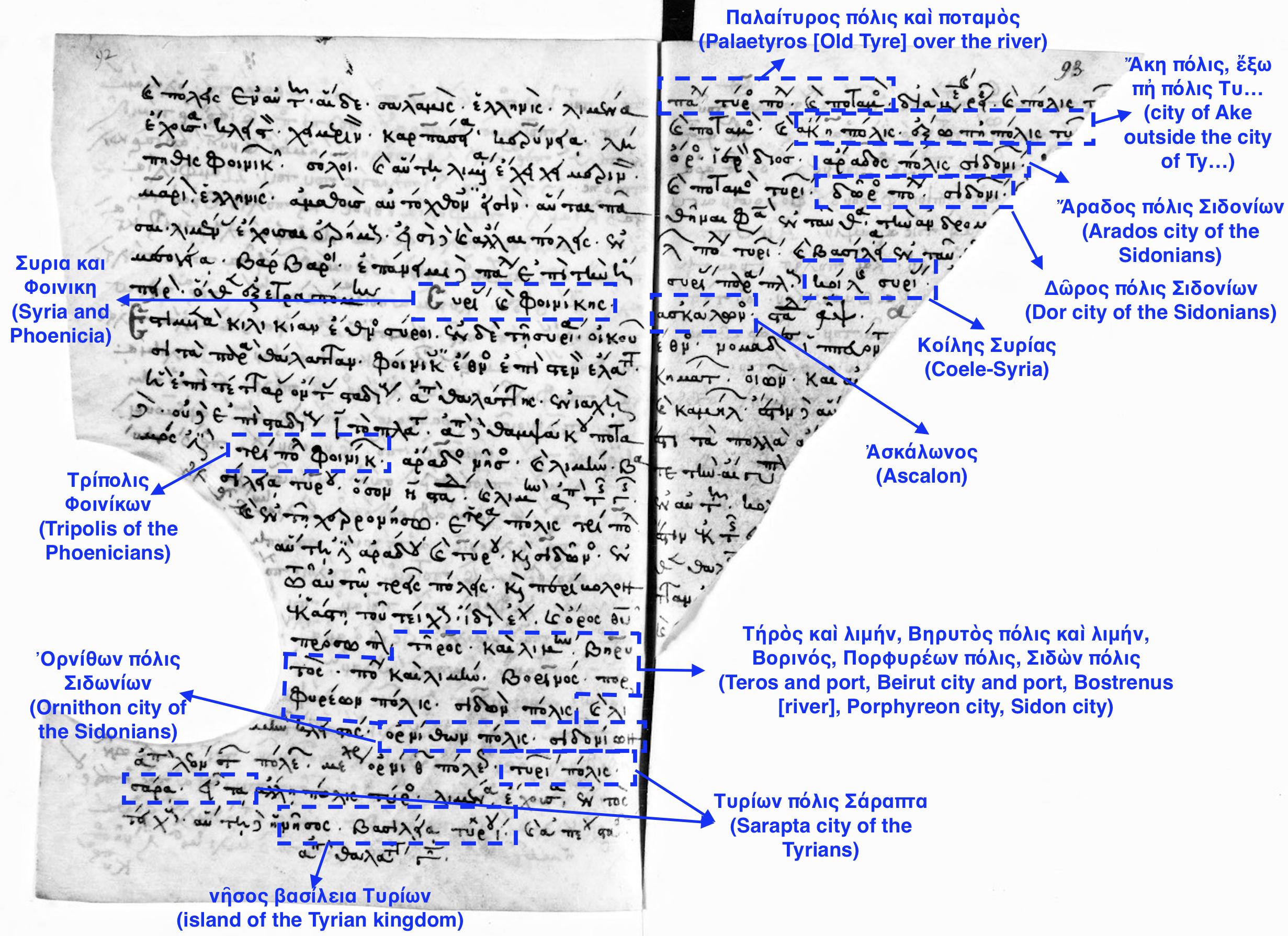
The 13th century surviving copy of the original Greek Pseudo-Scylax manuscript pages describing the coast of Syria and Phoenicia (annotated)

The Periplus of Pseudo-Scylax is an ancient Greek periplus (περίπλους períplous, 'circumnavigation') describing the sea route around the Mediterranean and Black Sea. It probably dates from the mid-4th century BC, specifically the 330s, and was probably written at or near Athens. Its author is often included among the ranks of 'minor' Greek geographers. There is only one manuscript available, which postdates the original work by over 1500 years.

The author's name is written Pseudo-Scylax or Pseudo-Skylax, often abbreviated as Ps.-Scylax or Ps.-Skylax.

== Author ==
The only extant, medieval manuscript names the author as "Scylax"' (or "Skylax"), but scholars have proven that this attribution is to be treated as a so-called "pseudepigraphical appeal to authority": Herodotus mentions a Scylax of Caryanda, a Greek navigator who in the late sixth century BC explored the coast of the Indian Ocean on behalf of the Persians. Many details in the work, however, reflect fourth-century BC knowledge of the world; since it cannot be by the sixth-century Scylax, its author is habitually referred to as Pseudo-Scylax.

== Text ==
=== Manuscript ===
There remains one primary manuscript, Parisinus suppl. gr. (Supplément grec) 443 (also known as the Pithou MS after its 16th-century owner, Pierre Pithou); it dates to the thirteenth century AD and is the original of those upon which the first printed edition of 1600 was based. Two later copies of this manuscript, which is notoriously corrupt, add nothing of substance. The principal manuscript was inaccessible to scholars for over two centuries until the 1830s, when it was bought by the Bibliothèque Nationale of France.

=== Content ===
The narrative attributed to this "Pseudo-Scylax" simulates a clockwise circumnavigation of the Mediterranean and Black Sea, starting in Iberia and ending in West Africa, beyond the Pillars of Hercules, that mark the Straits of Gibraltar.

The NW African section is sometimes claimed to have been derived from the earlier Periplus of Hanno the Navigator, but a close comparison makes the differences between the two texts apparent. Rather than the record of a voyage like Hanno's, or a compilation of eye-witness accounts of voyages, the Periplus of Pseudo-Scylax is probably an attempt at a quasi-scientific geographical account of the parts of the world accessible to Greeks in the 4th century BC. It can plausibly be associated with philosophical and scientific activities at Athens under Plato's successors in the Academy; the author was perhaps directly in contact with Plato's successors and with Aristotle and Theophrastos, in the years leading up to the foundation of Aristotle's school, the Peripatos or Lyceum. One of the aims of the work seems to be to calculate a total sailing length for the coasts of the Mediterranean and Black Sea, a geographical undertaking in which Aristotle's pupil Dikaiarchos of Messana went further, perhaps explicitly building upon the work of our unknown author.

== Early printing history ==
The Periplus of Scylax, along with other minor ancient Greek geographers, was first published in Augsburg in 1600 by David Hoeschel. In Amsterdam, the Periplus was published by Gerardus Vossius in 1639 and then by John Hudson in his Geographi Graeci Minores. In Paris, the Periplus was published in 1826 by Jean François Gail and in Berlin it was published in 1831 by Rudolf Heinrich Klausen.

== Modern editions ==
The Greek texts of Karl Müller (1855) and B. Fabricius (pseudonym of Heinrich Theodor Dittrich, 2nd edition 1878) have been superseded by P. Counillon Pseudo-Skylax: le périple du Pont-Euxin: texte, traduction, commentaire philologique et historique. (Bordeaux, 2004) and G. Shipley, Pseudo-Scylax's Periplus: Text, Translation, and Commentary (Exeter, 2011).

== Bibliography ==
=== Primary sources ===
- The manuscript
- Wikisource - The original Greek text, based on Müller, Paris 1855–61 – Περίπλους τῆς θαλάσσης τῆς οἰκουμένης Εὐρώπης καὶ Ἀσίας καὶ Λιβύης
- English translation by Brady Kiesling from the 1878 Greek edition of B. Fabricius.
- Geographica antiqua, Johann Friedrich Gronovius (ed.), Lugduni Batavorum, apud Jordanum Luchtmans, 1697, pp. 1–132.
- Geographi graeci minores, Karl Müller, Paris, editoribus Firmin-Didot et sociis, 1882, vol. 1 pp. 15–96.
- Hecataei Milesii fragmenta. Scylacis caryandensis periplus, Rudolf Heinrich Klausen (ed.), Berolini, impensis G. Reimeri, 1831, pp. 1–132.
- Fragments des poemes géographiques de Scymnus de Chio et du faux Dicéarque, M. Letronne (ed.), Paris, Librairie de Gide, 1840
- Anonymi vulgo Scylacis Caryandensis periplum maris interni, B. Fabricius (pseudonym of H. T. Dittrich), Lipsiae, typis et sumtibus B. G. Teubneri, 1878.

=== Secondary sources ===
- Patrick Counillon, Pseudo-Skylax, Le Périple du Pont-Euxin (Bordeaux, 2004).
- Graham Shipley, Pseudo-Skylax's Periplous: The Circumnavigation of the Inhabited World. Text, Translation and Commentary (Exeter: Bristol Phoenix Press/The Exeter Press), 2011. ISBN 978-1-904675-82-2 hardback, 978-1-904675-83-9 paperback. For details see http://www.liverpooluniversitypress.co.uk/index.php?option=com_wrapper&view=wrapper&Itemid=11&AS1=shipley
- D. Graham J. Shipley, ‘Pseudo-Skylax and the natural philosophers’, Journal of Hellenic Studies, vol. 132 (2012). Pre-print published in FirstView by Cambridge University Press on 6 Sept. 2012. doi:10.1017/S0075426912000092
- Galling, Kurt (1938). "Die syrisch-palästinische Küste nach der Beschreibung bei Pseudo-Skylax". Zeitschrift des Deutschen Palästina-Vereins. 61 (1/2). Deutscher Verein zur Erforschung Palästinas: 66–96. ISSN 2192-3124. JSTOR 27930190.
- Elayi, Josette (1982). "Studies in Phoenician Geography during the Persian Period". Journal of Near Eastern Studies. 41 (2). University of Chicago Press: 83–110. ISSN 0022-2968. JSTOR 544660.
- Lipiński, E. (2004). Itineraria Phoenicia. Orientalia Lovaniensia analecta. Uitgeverij Peeters en Departement Oosterse Studies. p. 273. ISBN 978-90-429-1344-8.
- Shipley, G. (2011). Pseudo-Skylax's Periplous: The Circumnavigation of the Inhabited World : Text, Translation and Commentary. Liverpool University Press Series. Bristol Phoenix Press. p. 180. ISBN 978-1-904675-82-2.
