= Scymnus of Chios =

Ancient Greek geographer

Scymnus of Chios (Ancient Greek: Σκύμνος ὁ Xῖος; fl. c. 185 BC) was a Greek geographer from the island of Chios. It was thought he was the author of the Periodos to Nicomedes, a work on geography written in Classical Greek. It is an account of the world (περιήγησις, periegesis) in 'comic' iambic trimeters which is dedicated to a King Nicomedes of Bithynia. This is either Nicomedes II Epiphanes who reigned from 149 BC for an unknown number of years or his son, Nicomedes III Euergetes.

== Attribution and publication of the Periegesis ==
It was first published at Augsburg in 1600. Because it was found together with the Epitomes of Marcianus of Heraclea it was first published under his name. Because this was clearly a mistake Lucas Holstenius and Isaac Vossius were the first to attribute it to Scymnus of Chios because he was cited more than once by late grammarians as the author of a Periegesis. It continued to pass under his name until 1846 when Augustus Meineke, in republishing the extant fragments, showed clearly that there were no grounds for ascribing them to that Scymnus. The real work of Scymnus of Chios appears to have been in prose and the few statements cited from him have no resemblance to the Periodos to Nicomedes. Since then work has been attributed to Pseudo-Scymnus.
