= Agathemerus =

Ancient Greek writer

Agathemerus (Ancient Greek: Ἀγαθήμερος) was a Greek geographer who during the Roman Greece period published a small two-part geographical work titled A Sketch of Geography in Epitome (τῆς γεωγραφίας ὑποτυπώσεις ἐν ἐπιτομῇ), addressed to his pupil Philon. The son of Orthon, Agathemerus is speculated to have lived in the 3rd century. Although little is known about Agathemerus historically, he lived after Ptolemy, whom he often quotes, and before the formation of Constantinople on the site of Byzantium by Constantine the Great in 328 AD, as he only refers to the city as Byzantium. From his speaking of Albion ἐν ᾗ στρατόπεδα ἵδρυται, it has been thought that he wrote not very long after the erection of the Wall of Severus. This is probably true, but the language is scarcely definite enough to establish the point.

Agathemerus's work consists chiefly of extracts from Ptolemy, Artemidorus Ephesius and other earlier writers. In his work, he gives a short account of the various forms assigned to the Earth by previous geographers. He calculated the distances between land masses and seas, and then laid down important distances on the inhabited part of the Earth using the stadiametric method.
