= Marcian of Heraclea =

Greek geographer

Marcian of Heraclea (Ancient Greek: Μαρκιανὸς Ἡρακλεώτης, Markianòs Hērakleṓtēs; Latin: Marcianus Heracleënsis; fl. c. 4th century AD) was a minor Greek geographer from Heraclea Pontica in Late Antiquity.

His known works are:

- Periplus of the Outer Sea (Greek: Περιπλοισ τησ εΞω Θαλασσησ). It mentions places from the Atlantic ocean to China.
- An epitome of Menippus of Pergamon.
- An epitome of Artemidorus Ephesius:
- On the Distances of Cities from Rome.

Artemidorus and Menippus both likely wrote around the 1st century AD. Only little survives of the epitomes, through citations in the work of Stephanus of Byzantium, but in the case of Menippus there is also some manuscript material. From it, it seems Marcian had not improved much upon Menippus. Early in its publication history, the work of Pseudo-Scymnus had been attributed to Marcian. Apart from his writings, philologists believe that an annotated collection Marcian made of his sources in geography formed the basis of today's extant manuscripts of these earlier works.

The date of Marcian can only be inferred. He was earlier than Stephen of Byzantium, by whom he is quoted, and later than Ptolemy, upon whose work his own depends. Salmasius in his Exercitationes Plinianae placed him about the time of Synesius, who speaks of a Marcian in his "Epistola C" to the Heracleote rhetor Pylaemenes. But there is danger of error in assuming this to be the same Marcian. Müller places him about A.D.400.

== Manuscripts and Publication History ==
The text of Markianos/Marcian is preserved in 3 medieval manuscripts:

- Codex Parisinus Supplément grec 443 (12th century)
- Codex Vaticanus Palatinus graecus 142 (15th century)
- Codex Monacensis 566 (16th century)

The publication history is:

- Hoeshelius, Augsberg (1600) (Editio princeps)
- Dodwell's Hudson, Oxford (1798)
- Zosimiadon, Vienna (1807)
- E. Muller, Paris (1839)
- Hoffman, Leipzig (1841)
- C. Muller, Paris (1853) (textus receptus for Schoff's 1927 English translation)
