= Pseudo-Scymnus =

Ancient Greek geographer

Pseudo-Scymnus is the name given by Augustus Meineke to the unknown author of a work on geography written in Classical Greek, the Periodos to Nicomedes. It is an account of the world (periegesis) in 'comic' iambic trimeters which is dedicated to a King Nicomedes of Bithynia. This is either Nicomedes II Epiphanes who reigned from 149 BC for an unknown number of years or his son, Nicomedes III Euergetes. The author explicitly takes for his model Apollodorus of Athens, whose chronography in trimeters was dedicated to King Attalus II Philadelphus of Pergamum.

== Attribution of authorship ==
The Periodos to Nicomedes was first published at Augsburg in 1600. Because it was found together with the Epitomes of Marcianus of Heraclea it was first published under his name. Because this was clearly a mistake Lucas Holstenius and Isaac Vossius were the first to attribute it to Scymnus of Chios, a writer cited more than once by late grammarians as the author of a periegesis. It continued to pass under his name until 1846 when Augustus Meineke, in republishing the extant fragments, showed clearly that there were no grounds for ascribing them to that writer. The real work of Scymnus of Chios appears to have been in prose and the few statements cited from him are not in accordance with those of Pseudo-Scymnus.

In 1955, Aubrey Diller determined that Pseudo-Scymnus was most likely Pausanias of Damascus. If this is true, he would have lived in Bithynia around 100 BC. In 2004 Konstantin Boshnakov argued for Semos of Delos, and consequently for a somewhat later date than is usually offered.

== Content of the Periodos to Nicomedes ==
The standard text, with a French translation, is now Didier Marcotte, Pseudo-Scymnos, Circuit de la terre (Paris, 2000). The work contains material on the coasts of Spain, Liguria, the Euxine (Black Sea), data on various Greek colonies, as well as information about the ancient Umbrians, Celts, Liburnians and other peoples.
