= Saba (wind) =

The Ṣabā (Arabic: الصبا, romanized: aṣ-Ṣabā [asˤˈsˤabaː]) is an east wind that blows in the west of the Arabian peninsula. Because of its gentleness (riqqa) and pleasant breeze, it was especially popular among the Arabs, and was called "Wind of the lovers" (rīḥ al-ʿuššāq). The Ṣabā was considered the wind that gathers the clouds and brings rain and, unlike the west and south winds, does not cause dryness (haif). The Arabs living in the Desert are said to have set up their tents in a way that they could capture the Ṣabā with their openings. In classical Arabic lyrical poetry, the wind is highly praised and plays a role similar to the Zephyrus of the Greco-Roman world. Since there is a canonical Hadith stating that Muhammad is said to have enjoyed the support of the Ṣabā wind, it holds religious significance in Islam as well. In Arabic-Islamic meteorology, the term "Ṣabā" later became a general term, independent of its local occurrence, to refer to the east wind which, alongside the north wind (šimāl), south wind (janūb), and west wind (dabūr), constitutes one of the four cardinal winds of the wind rose.

== Etymology ==
According to the Arabic encyclopedist al-Nuwayri, the Ṣabā wind is said to be named so because the people are fond of it due to its pleasant breeze and air (taṣbū ilaihā). The Arabic word "ṣabwa" indeed means "affection, desire".

== The Ṣabā-wind as a motif in literature ==
=== Significance in classical arabic poetry ===
According to Jaroslaw Stekevych, he is "as bearer of perfumed messages from the beloved" the wind of love memories, and the messenger of joyful tidings. As such, he also appears in the poetry of Imru' al-Qais. In his Muʿallaqat, he reminisces about the journey of two former lovers with the words:

إِذَا قَامَتَا تَضَوَّعَ المِسْكُ مِنْهُمَـا
نَسِيْمَ الصَّبَا جَاءَتْ بِرَيَّا القَرَنْفُلِ

Iḏā qāmatā taḍauwaʿa l-misku minhumā
Nasīm aṣ-Ṣabā ǧāʾat bi-raiyā l-qurunful

When they rose, musk fragrance emanated from them,
Just as the Ṣabā breeze carries the scent of cloves.

While there are some instances in which the Ṣabā appears as a wind that is harsh and relentless, the image of the "gentle, erotic, rain-bringing, and fertilizing" Ṣabā was predominant in pre-Islamic Arabic poetry and would continue to be one of the most enduring and intensely charged words of the Arabic lyric poetry, serving as a mood indicator even later. From the Umayyad period onward, the Ṣabā was considered a wind that originates in Najd, thus giving Najd a similar symbolic significance as the Greek region of Arcadia. In a verse attributed to Layla and Majnun that actually comes from the late Umayyad poet Ibn Dumaina, it is said:

أَلاَ يَا صَبَا نَجْدٍ مَتى هِجْتِ مِنْ نَجْدٍ
لَقَدْ زَادَني مَسـراكِ وَجْداً عَلى وَجْدِ

A-lā yā Ṣabā naǧdin matā hiǧti min Naǧd
La-qad zādanī masrāki waǧdan ʿalā waǧd

Oh, Ṣabā of the highland, when will you rise from the Najd?
Your nocturnal journey always makes me lovesick.

ʿAlī ibn al-Djahm, the courtly poet of Baghdad, maintains the image of Ṣabā as a rain- and fertility-bestowing wind, comparing it to an old woman who brings the poet a young woman:

وَسارِيَةٍ تَرتادُ أَرضاً تَجودُها
شَغَلتُ بِها عَيناً قَليلاً هُجودُها
أَتَتنا بِها ريحُ الصَبا وَكَأَنَّها
فَتاةٌ تُزَجّيها عَجوزٌ تَقودُها

Wa-sāriyatin tartādu arḍan taǧūduhā
Šaġaltu bihā ʿainan qalīlan huǧūduhā
Atatnā bihā rīḥ aṣ-Ṣabā
Fatātun tuzaǧǧīhā ʿaǧūzun taqūduhā

A night cloud searching for a land to bestow its rain upon,
With it, I occupied my sleepless eyes,
The Ṣabā wind brought it, as if it were
A young maiden, propelled and guided by an old woman.

As-Sanaubarī, a librarian and poet at the court of Sayf al-Dawla, in one of his poems, compares the cypresses in the nightly garden, moved by the Ṣabā wind, to playful girls:

وكأنَّ إِحداهنَّ من نفح الصَّبَا
خودٌ تلاعبُ مَوْهِناً أترابَها
والنهرُ قد هَزَّتْهُ أرواحُ الصَّبَا
طرباً وَجَرَّتْ فَوْقَه أهدابَها

Wa-ka-anna iḥdāhunna min nafḥi ṣ-Ṣabā
Ḫūdun tulāʿibu mauhinan atrābahā
Wa-n-nahru qad hazzathu arwāḥu ṣ-Ṣabā
ṭaraban wa-ǧarrat fauqahū ahdābahā

As if each of them, moved by the breath of Ṣabā,
were a young girl, playing at night with her peers.
The Ṣabā whispers have turned the river into joyful waves
and raised their hems above it.

=== As a motif in modern literature ===
The motif of the Ṣabā wind is also taken up by modern Arab poets like Ahmed Shawqi. Furthermore, it has also found resonance outside the Arab world among admirers of Arabic poetry. Johann Wolfgang von Goethe, in his West-eastern Divan, associates it with the ultimate locus amoenus of the Islamic paradise. In his poem titled Deserving Men, which describes the afterlife fate of the Muslim martyrs of the Battle of Badr, he has the Ṣabā wind, referred to as the 'Eastern Wind' by him, bring a host of heavenly virgins:

And now a sweet wind from the east brings
A host of heavenly maidens, led here;
With your eyes, you begin to savor,
Just the sight alone satisfies completely.

The motif of the Ṣabā wind has also found its way into modern Malay literature. Thus, Sayyid Shaykh al-Hadi in his love novel 'Hikayat Faridah Hanom' employs this motif when describing the first night's encounter of the lovers, writing that Faridah Hanom hurried there "like an Ashoka branch blown by the Ṣabā wind" (seumpama dahan angsoka yang ditiup oleh angin rih al-saba).

== Religious significance in Islam ==
The Ṣabā wind is also attributed religious significance in Islam due to a Hadith transmitted by Ibn Abbas, in which Muhammad is reported to have said: "I was granted victory by the Ṣabā, and the ʿĀd were destroyed by the Dabūr" (nuṣirtu bi-ṣ-Ṣabā wa-uhlikat ʿĀd bi-d-Dabūr). According to al-Qalqashandi, this statement referred to the 'Day of the Confederates' (yaum al-aḥzāb), which was the Battle of the Trench. According to a gloss transmitted by Ibn Abbas, the wind in the Quranic statement 'Then we sent a wind and hordes that you did not see' (Quran 33:9) refers to the Ṣabā. Ibn Hajar al-ʿAsqalānī later followed this interpretation in his commentary on Sahīh al-Bukhārī as well.

An-Nuwairī quotes a tradition stating that no prophet was ever called without the support of the Ṣabā (mā buʿiṯa nabīy illā waṣ-Ṣabā maʿahū). As well as the wind that was made obedient to Solomon according to Surah 34:12 is said to be the Ṣabā wind.

== Other Names ==
According to al-Qalqashandi, the Ṣabā wind was also called Qabūl because it blows against one who faces east. In Egypt, this wind was simply referred to as 'the Eastern' (aš-šarqīya).

== Literature ==
- Abū ʿAlī al-Marzūqī (gest. 1030): Kitāb al-Azmina wa-l-amkina. Ed. Ḫalīl al-Manṣūr. Dār al-kutub al-ʿilmīya, Beirut 1996. Digitalisat
- Jaroslav Stetkevych: The Zephyrs of Najd. The Poetics of Nostalgia in the Classical Arabic Nasīb. The University of Chicago Press, Chicago/London 1993.
