= Ehecatotontli =

Group of gods from Aztec mythology

Ehecatotontli is an Aztec group of gods that are forms of Ehecatl. The Ehecatotontli are Mictlanpachecatl, Cihuatecayotl, Tlalocayotl, and Huitztlampaehecatl.
