= Cihuatecayotl =

Aztec god of the West Wind

In Aztec mythology, Cihuatecayotl (roughly pronounced 'see-wah-teh-kye-olth') is the god of the West wind. His brothers are Mictlanpachecatl, Tlalocayotl, and Huitztlampaehecatl, who personify the winds from the north, east, and south respectively.

== See also ==
- Zephyrus/Favonius
