= Tlalocayotl =

Aztec god of the East wind

In Aztec mythology, Tlalocayotl (pronounced '*Tlah-low-kye-ottle') is the god of the East wind. His brothers are Cihuatecayotl, Mictlanpachecatl, and Huitztlampaehecatl, who personify the winds from the west, north, and south, respectively.

== See also ==
- Eurus
- Subsolanus
