= Huitztlampaehecatl =

Aztec god of the south wind

- God of the South Wind
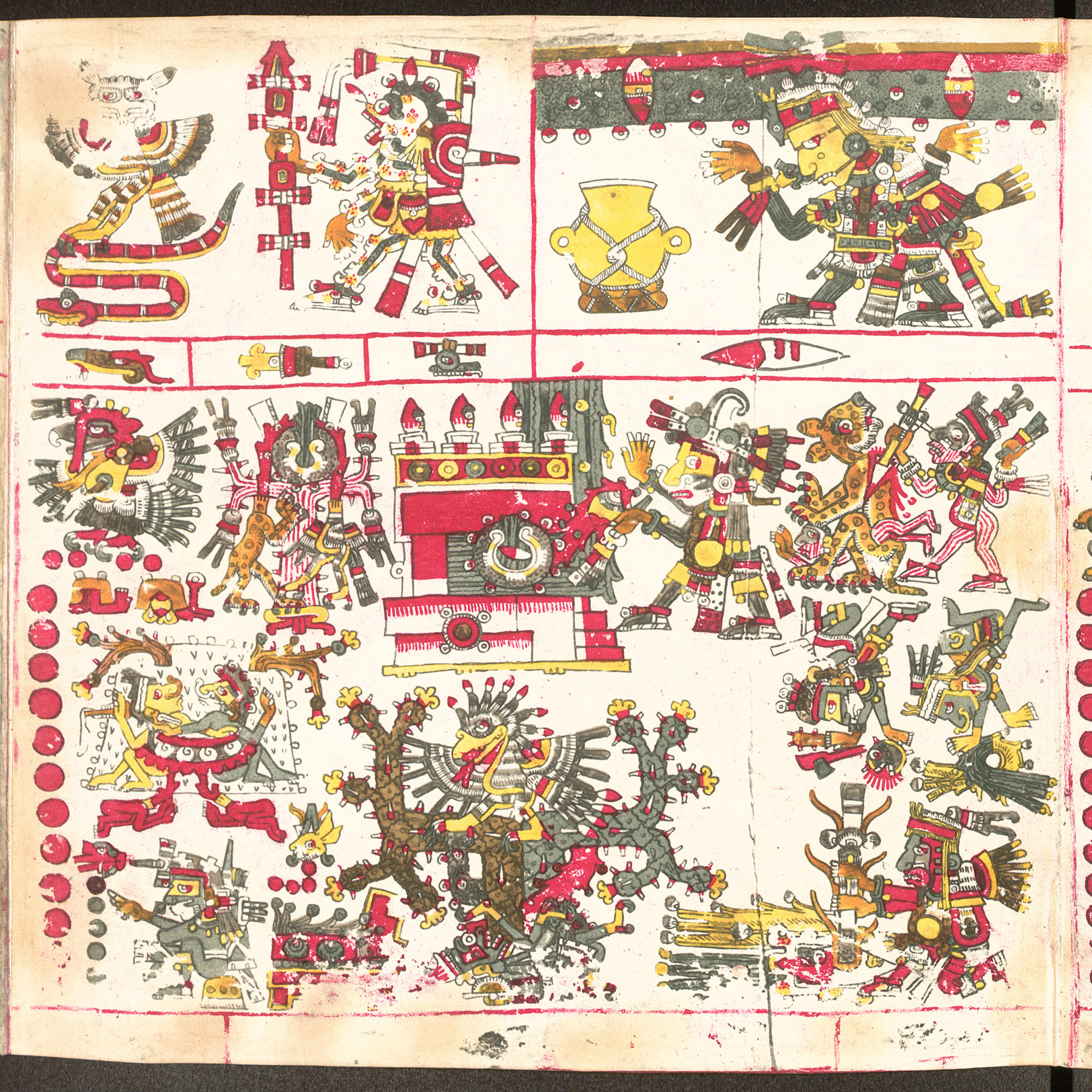
- A page of the Codex Borgia

Genealogy
- Siblings: Cihuatecayotl, Tlalocayotl, and Mictlanpachecatl

In Aztec mythology Huitztlampaehecatl (Nahuatl pronunciation: [witstɬaːmpaeʔekatɬ]) is the god of the South wind. His brothers are Cihuatecayotl, Tlalocayotl, and Mictlanpachecatl, who personify the winds from the west, east, and north respectively.

== See also ==
- Notus
- Auster
