= Mictlanpachecatl =

Aztec god of the north wind

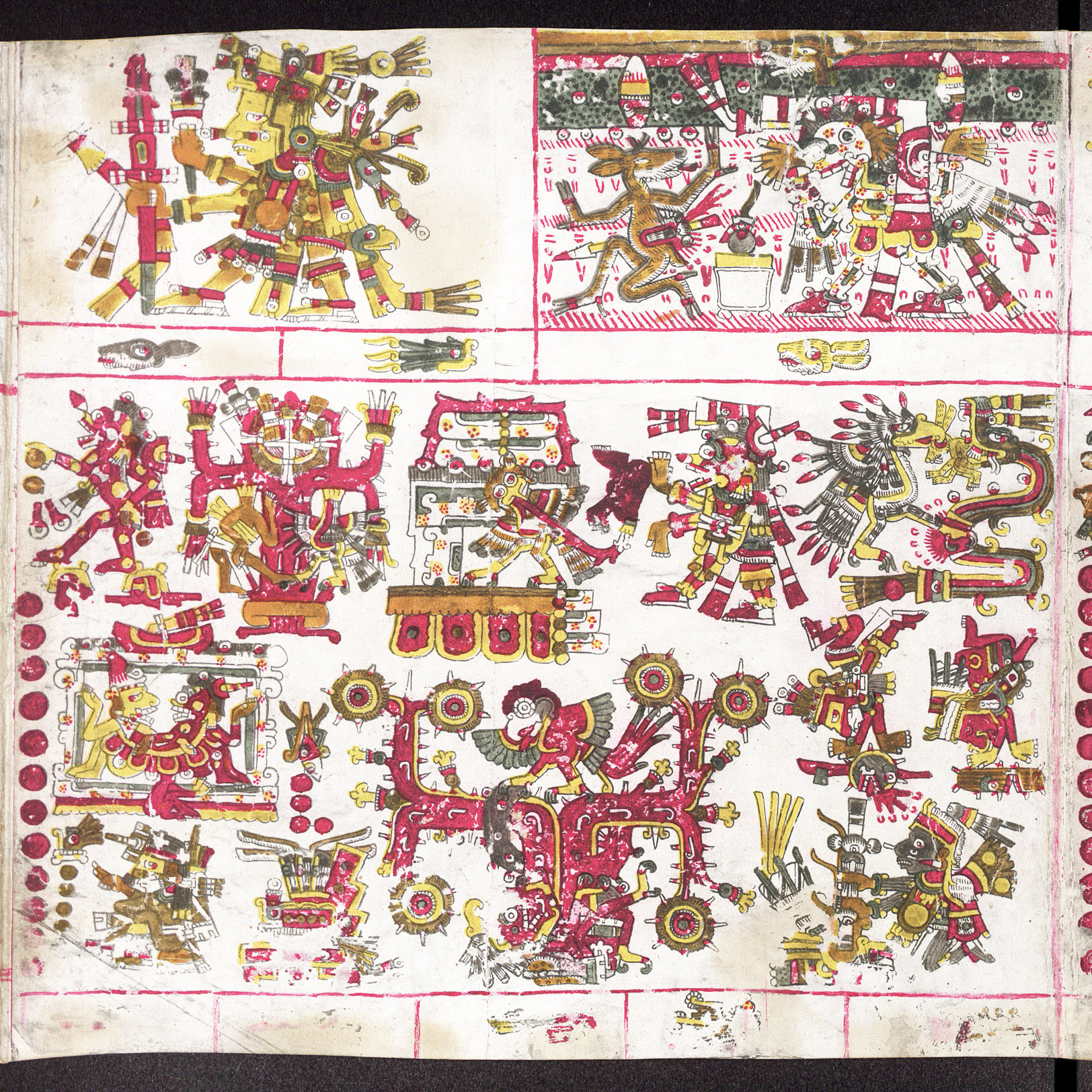
The north, as illustrated in the Codex Borgia

In Aztec mythology, Mictlanpachecatl (pronounced: mikt-*lawn-pah-che-kot) is the god of the North wind. His brothers are Cihuatecayotl, Tlalocayotl, and Huitztlampaehecatl, who personify the winds from the west, east, and south respectively.

== See also ==
- Boreas
- Septentrio
