= Mata Upola =

Polynesian wind god

In Polynesian mythology, Mata Upola or Marangai was the third wind that Maui took control of. He represented the east wind.
