= Ponente =

West wind in Mediterranean sea

The winds of the Mediterranean

The Ponente (/pəʊˈnɛnti/; poh-NEN-tee; Italian: Ponente; French: Ponant; Spanish: Poniente; Catalan: Ponent; Sicilian: Punenti; Corsican: Punenti; Croatian: Pulenat; Aragonese: Ponient; Lombard: Punant; Macedonian: Пуленат; Greek: πουνέντες) is a west wind in the Mediterranean Sea. It blows from the Atlantic through the Strait of Gibraltar and is one of the prevailing winds in the western Mediterranean.

== Etymology ==
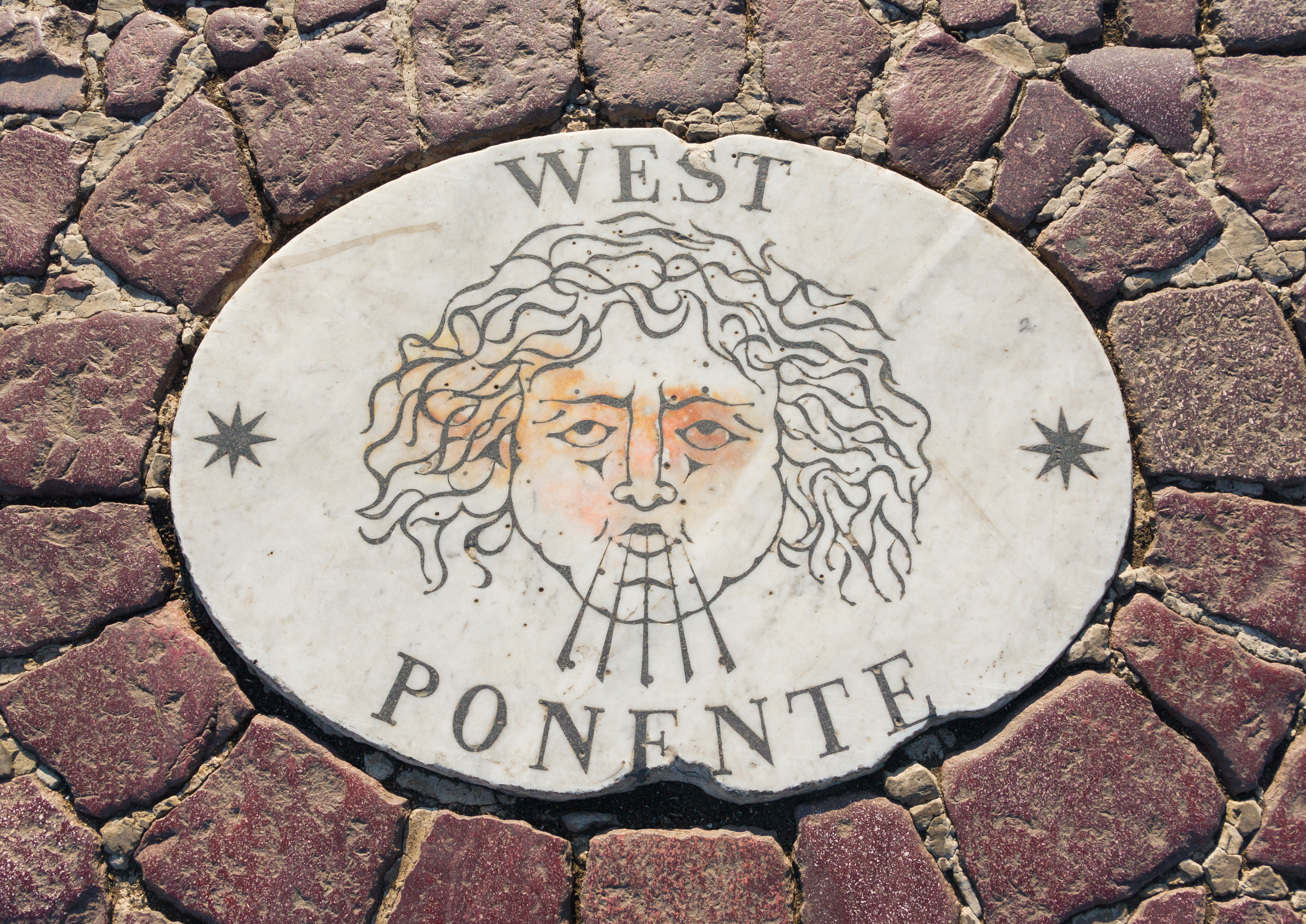
Plaque indicating the westerly direction on St. Peter's Square

Ponente originates from Latin pōnō meaning "to place, put". In Italian the word was also used to refer to the setting sun and became synonymous with the west, similarly to how Levant ("to raise") refers to the east. With the spread of the Mediterranean Lingua Franca the term got established as both a wind and a traditional mediterranean compass point though the region, as well as the Atlantic Ocean. In 1852 Pope Pius IX added these traditional winds to the wind rose of St. Peter's Square.

== Meteorology ==
Flow of the Ponente in winter

In the west the Ponente has two different characters depending on the season. The first is a monsoon-like seasonal wind that mostly blows from November to March. This is due to the Iberian landmass being colder than the water, combined with a High-pressure area over the Maghreb leading to a strong flow from the Atlantic through the Strait of Gibraltar into the western mediterranean. This is reinforced by the Atlantic Low-pressure area moving towards the Bay of Biscay. The effect is reinforced by the Venturi effect caused by the Sierra Nevada and the Atlas Mountains. This results in stormy rain showers and strong gusts across the whole western mediterranean with windspeeds between 4 to 7 Beaufort. These strong gusts are also known as Vendavales.

Flow of the Ponente in summer

During the summer the Ponente is usually created by the Azores High over the atlantic and the Genoan Low over the mediterranean. Thermals further strengthen the effect, leading to a strong cool and dry wind with few gusts with a speed of up to 7 Beaufort. These characteristics are ideal for sailing and bring refreshments on the southern Spanish coast. Either variation often switches with the easterly levant, the Ponente being more prevalent in winter.

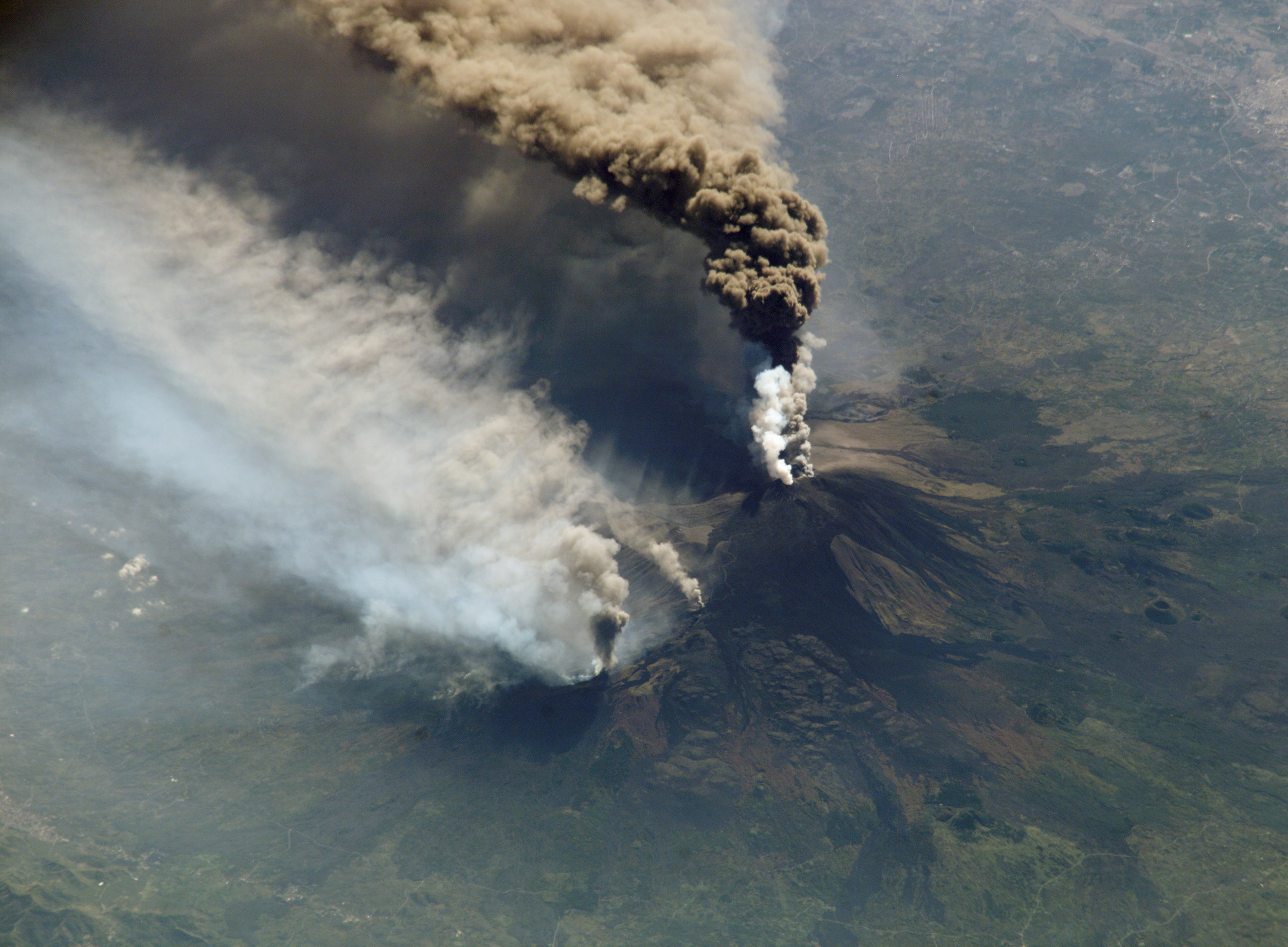
Mount Etna eruption in 2002 with the plume being blown eastward by the Ponente.

Moving eastwards, the Ponente becomes less intensive. The corresponding greek and roman winds Zephyrus and Favonius are described as gentle and favourable and are associated with a tender breeze. This characteristic is also observed in France and Adriatic countries. In Italy and particularly Sicily the Ponente is temperate and responsible for good weather and clearing air pollution. Even further east, towards Turkey, the Etesian is sometimes misidentified as a Ponente, due to their similar directions.
