= Negafook =

Inuit deity

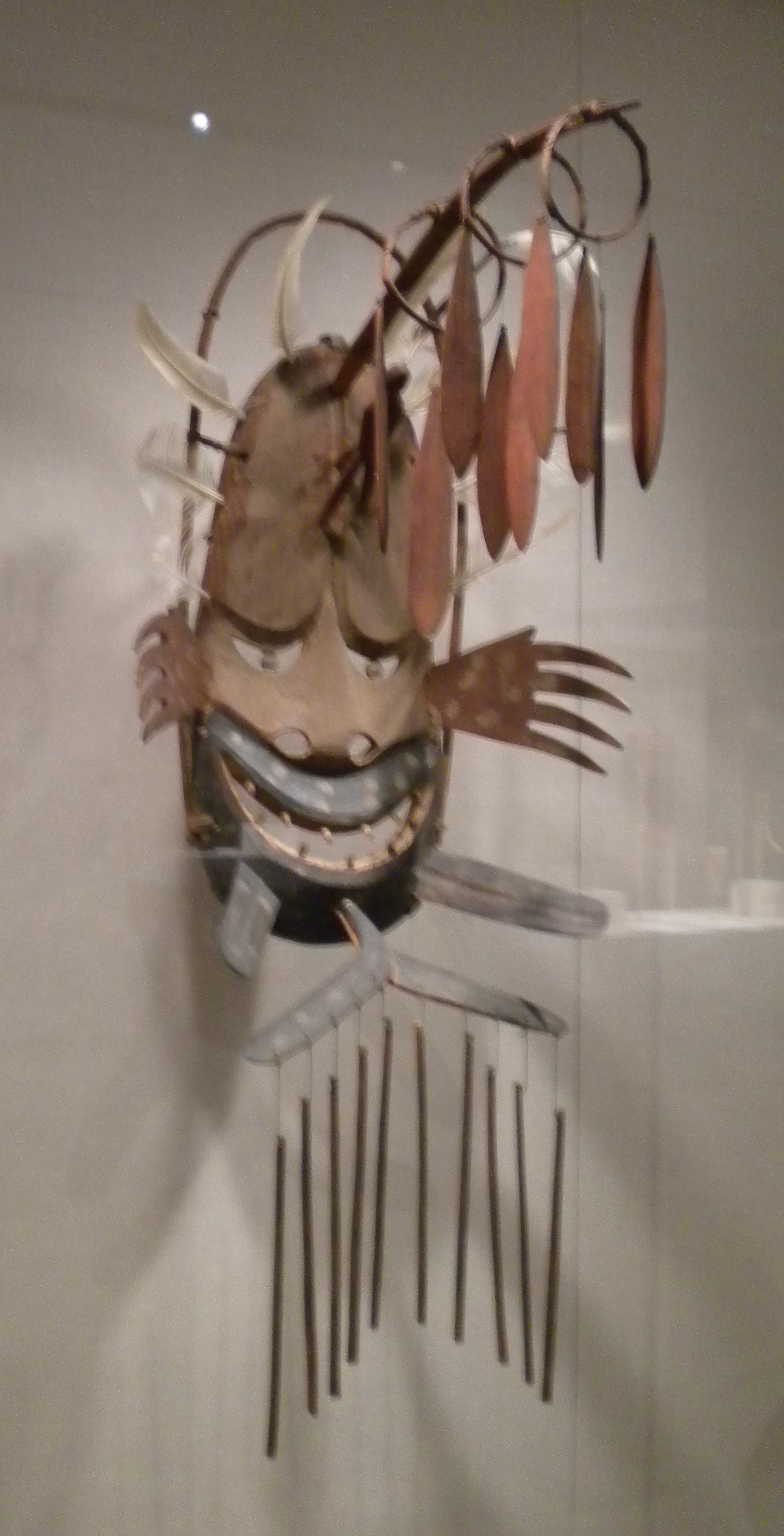
Negafook (negeqvaruaq in Central Yup'ik) depicted in a Yup'ik mask

In the Inuit religion of the Yup'ik the Negafook (or Negagfok) represents "the North Wind" or "the spirit that likes cold and stormy weather."

A mask representing Negafok is held by the Metropolitan Museum of Art in New York City. It was created for use in ceremonies, along with masks that represented the other winds, and commemorates a "weather event" in the early 20th century.
