= Egoi =

Minor divinity of the South Wind

Egoi is a minor divinity among the Basques associated with the south wind. Egoi creates windstorms.
