= Wind =

Natural movement of air or other gases relative to a planet's surface

Cherry tree moving with the wind blowing about 22 m/sec (about 79 km/h or 49 mph)

Sound of wind blowing in a pine forest at around 25 m/sec, with gust alterations

Wind is the natural movement of air or other gases relative to a planet's surface. Winds occur on a range of scales, from thunderstorm flows lasting tens of minutes, to local breezes generated by heating of land surfaces and lasting a few hours, to global winds resulting from the difference in absorption of solar energy between the climate zones on Earth. The study of wind is known as anemology.

The two main causes of large-scale atmospheric circulation are the differential heating between the equator and the poles, and the rotation of the planet, which is called the Coriolis effect. Within the tropics and subtropics, thermal low circulations over terrain and high plateaus can drive monsoon circulations. In coastal areas the sea breeze/land breeze cycle can define local winds; in areas that have variable terrain, mountain and valley breezes can prevail.

Winds are commonly classified by their spatial scale, their speed and direction, the forces that cause them, the regions in which they occur, and their effect. Winds have various defining aspects such as velocity (wind speed), the density of the gases involved, and energy content or wind energy. In meteorology, winds are often referred to according to their strength, and the direction from which the wind is blowing. The convention for directions refer to where the wind comes from; therefore, a 'western' or 'westerly' wind blows from the west to the east, a 'northern' wind blows south, and so on. This is sometimes counter-intuitive.

Short bursts of high speed wind are termed gusts. Strong winds of intermediate duration (around one minute) are termed squalls. Long-duration winds have various names associated with their average strength, such as breeze, gale, storm, and hurricane.

In outer space, solar wind is the movement of gases or charged particles from the Sun through space, while planetary wind is the outgassing of light chemical elements from a planet's atmosphere into space. The strongest observed winds on a planet in the Solar System occur on Neptune and Saturn.

In human civilization, the concept of wind has been explored in mythology, influenced the events of history, expanded the range of transport and warfare, and provided a power source for mechanical work, electricity, and recreation. Wind powers the voyages of sailing ships across Earth's oceans. Hot air balloons use the wind to take short trips, and powered flight uses it to increase lift and reduce fuel consumption. Areas of wind shear caused by various weather phenomena can lead to dangerous situations for aircraft. When winds become strong, trees and human-made structures can be damaged or destroyed.

Winds can shape landforms, via a variety of aeolian processes such as the formation of fertile soils, for example loess, and by erosion. Dust from large deserts can be moved great distances from its source region by the prevailing winds; winds that are accelerated by rough topography and associated with dust outbreaks have been assigned regional names in various parts of the world because of their significant effects on those regions. Wind also affects the spread of wildfires. Winds can disperse seeds from various plants, enabling the survival and dispersal of those plant species, as well as flying insect and bird populations. When combined with cold temperatures, the wind has a negative impact on livestock. Wind affects animals' food stores, as well as their hunting and defensive strategies.

== Causes ==
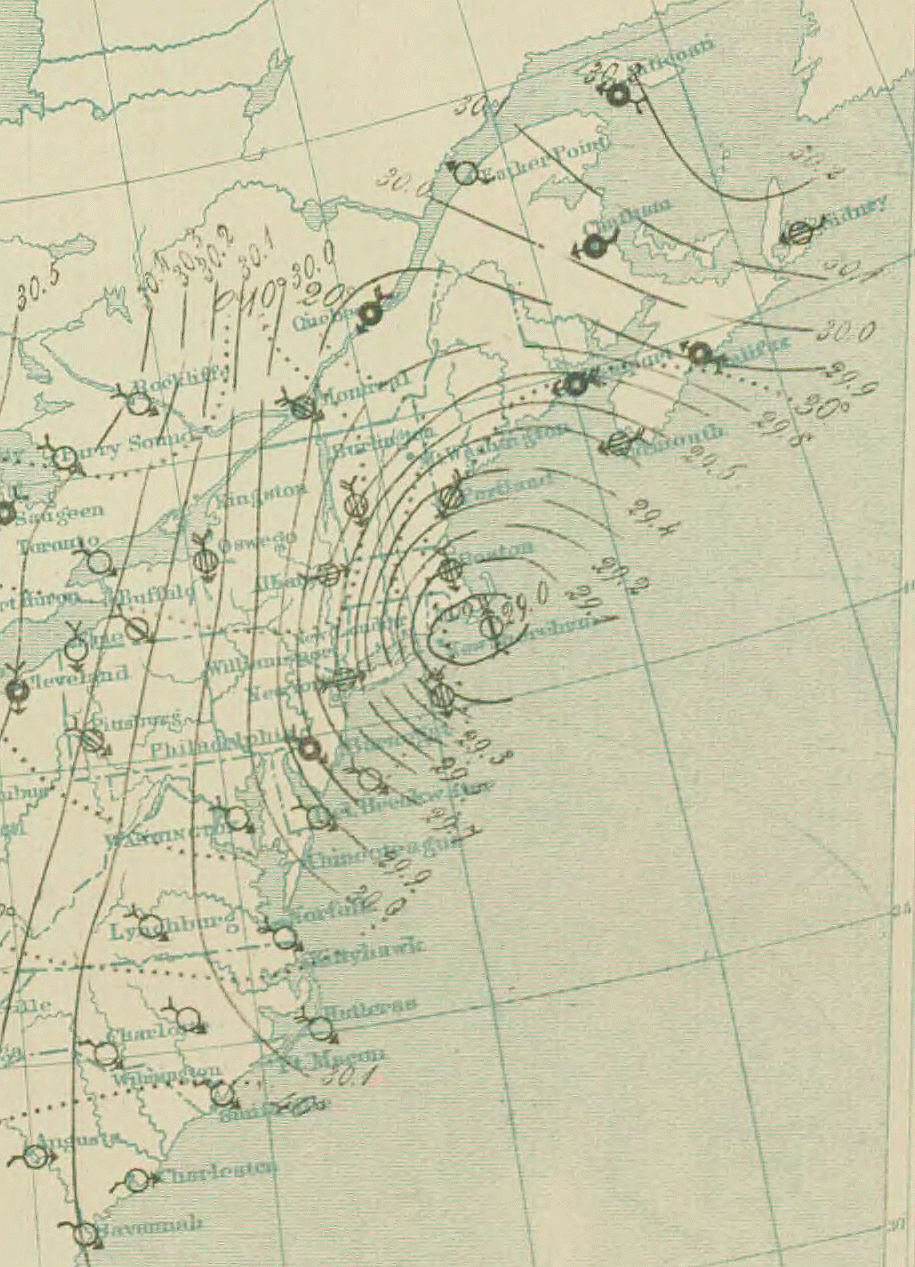
Surface analysis of the Great Blizzard of 1888. Areas with greater isobaric packing indicate higher winds.

Wind is caused by differences in atmospheric pressure, which are primarily due to temperature differences. When a difference in atmospheric pressure exists, air moves from the higher to the lower pressure area, resulting in winds of various speeds. On a rotating planet, air will also be deflected by the Coriolis effect, except exactly on the equator. Globally, the two major driving factors of large-scale wind patterns (the atmospheric circulation) are the differential heating between the equator and the poles (difference in absorption of solar energy leading to buoyancy forces) and the rotation of the planet. Outside the tropics and aloft from frictional effects of the surface, the large-scale winds tend to approach geostrophic balance. Near the Earth's surface, friction causes the wind to be slower than it would be otherwise. Surface friction also causes winds to blow more inward into low-pressure areas.

Winds defined by an equilibrium of physical forces are used in the decomposition and analysis of wind profiles. They are useful for simplifying the atmospheric equations of motion and for making qualitative arguments about the horizontal and vertical distribution of horizontal winds. The geostrophic wind component is the result of the balance between Coriolis force and pressure gradient force. It flows parallel to isobars and approximates the flow above the atmospheric boundary layer in the midlatitudes. The thermal wind is the difference in the geostrophic wind between two levels in the atmosphere. It exists only in an atmosphere with horizontal temperature gradients. The ageostrophic wind component is the difference between actual and geostrophic wind, which is responsible for air "filling up" cyclones over time. The gradient wind is similar to the geostrophic wind but also includes centrifugal force (or centripetal acceleration).

== Measurement ==
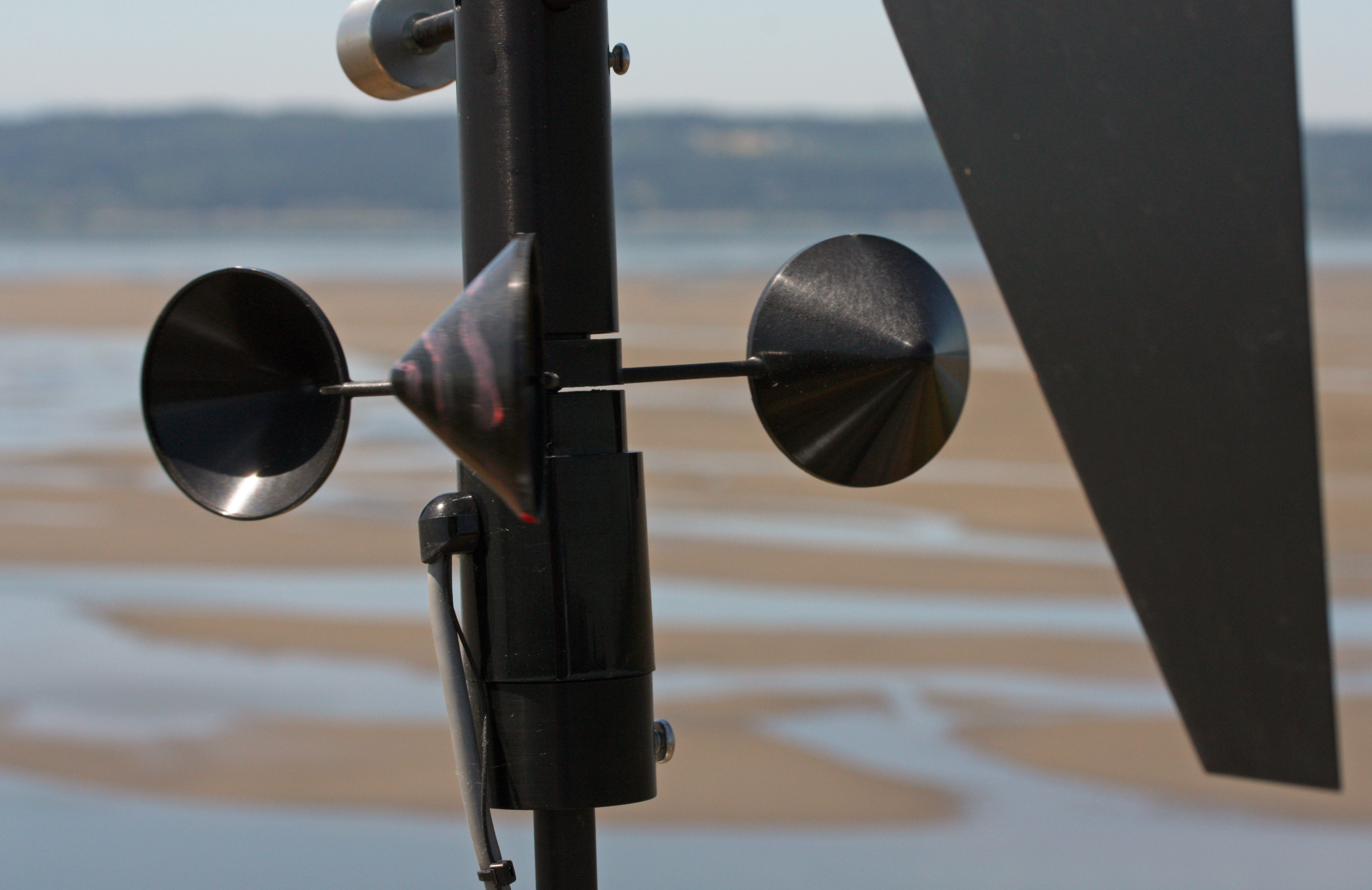
Cup-type anemometer on a remote meteorological station

Wind direction is usually expressed in terms of the direction from which it originates. For example, a northerly wind blows from the north to the south. Weather vanes pivot to indicate the direction of the wind. At airports, windsocks indicate wind direction, and can also be used to estimate wind speed by the angle of hang. Wind speed is measured by anemometers, most commonly using rotating cups or propellers. When a high measurement frequency is needed (such as in research applications), wind can be measured by the propagation speed of ultrasound signals or by the effect of ventilation on the resistance of a heated wire. Another type of anemometer uses pitot tubes that take advantage of the pressure differential between an inner tube and an outer tube that is exposed to the wind to determine the dynamic pressure, which is then used to compute the wind speed.

Sustained wind speeds are reported globally at a 10-meter (33 ft) height and are averaged over a 10‑minute time frame. The United States reports winds over a 1‑minute average for tropical cyclones, and a 2‑minute average within weather observations. India typically reports winds over a 3‑minute average. Knowing the wind sampling average is important, as the value of a one-minute sustained wind is typically 14% greater than a ten-minute sustained wind. A short burst of high speed wind is termed a wind gust; one technical definition of a wind gust is: the maxima that exceed the lowest wind speed measured during a ten-minute time interval by 10 knots (19 km/h; 12 mph) for periods of seconds. A squall is an increase of the wind speed above a certain threshold, which lasts for a minute or more.

To determine winds aloft, radiosondes determine wind speed by GPS, radio navigation, or radar tracking of the probe. Alternatively, movement of the parent weather balloon position can be tracked from the ground visually using theodolites. Remote sensing techniques for wind include SODAR, Doppler lidars and radars, which can measure the Doppler shift of electromagnetic radiation scattered or reflected off suspended aerosols or molecules, and radiometers and radars can be used to measure the surface roughness of the ocean from space or airplanes. Ocean roughness can be used to estimate wind velocity close to the sea surface over oceans. Geostationary satellite imagery can be used to estimate the winds at cloud top based upon how far clouds move from one image to the next. Wind engineering describes the study of the effects of the wind on the built environment, including buildings, bridges and other artificial objects.

== Models ==
Models can provide spatial and temporal information about airflow. Spatial information can be obtained through the interpolation of data from various measurement stations, allowing for horizontal data calculation. Alternatively, profiles, such as the logarithmic wind profile, can be utilized to derive vertical information.

Temporal information is typically computed by solving the Navier-Stokes equations within numerical weather prediction models, generating global data for General Circulation Models or specific regional data. The calculation of wind fields is influenced by factors such as radiation differentials, Earth's rotation, and friction, among others. Solving the Navier-Stokes equations is a time-consuming numerical process, but machine learning techniques can help expedite computation time.

Numerical weather prediction models have significantly advanced understanding of atmospheric dynamics and have become critical tools in weather forecasting and climate research.

== Wind force scale ==
Historically, the Beaufort wind force scale, created by Francis Beaufort, provides an empirical description of wind speed based on observed sea conditions. Originally it was a 13-level scale (0–12), but during the 1940s, the scale was expanded to 18 levels (0–17). There are general terms that differentiate winds of different average speeds such as a breeze, a gale, a storm, or a hurricane. Within the Beaufort scale, gale-force winds lie between 28 knots (52 km/h) and 55 knots (102 km/h) with preceding adjectives such as moderate, fresh, strong, and whole used to differentiate the wind's strength within the gale category. A storm has winds of 56 knots (104 km/h) to 63 knots (117 km/h). The terminology for tropical cyclones differs from one region to another globally. Most ocean basins use the average wind speed to determine the tropical cyclone's category. Below is a summary of the classifications used by Regional Specialized Meteorological Centers worldwide:

| General wind classifications | | | Tropical cyclone classifications (all winds are 10-minute averages) | | | | | | |
| Beaufort scale | 10-minute sustained winds | | General term | N Indian Ocean IMD | SW Indian Ocean MF | Australian region South Pacific BoM, BMKG, FMS, MSNZ | NW Pacific JMA | NW Pacific JTWC | NE Pacific & N Atlantic NHC & CPHC |
| Beaufort scale | (knots) | (km/h) | General term | N Indian Ocean IMD | SW Indian Ocean MF | Australian region South Pacific BoM, BMKG, FMS, MSNZ | NW Pacific JMA | NW Pacific JTWC | NE Pacific & N Atlantic NHC & CPHC |
|---|---|---|---|---|---|---|---|---|---|
| 0 | <1 | <2 | Calm | Low Pressure Area | Tropical disturbance | Tropical low Tropical Depression | Tropical depression | Tropical depression | Tropical depression |
| 1 | 1–3 | 2–6 | Light air | Low Pressure Area | Tropical disturbance | Tropical low Tropical Depression | Tropical depression | Tropical depression | Tropical depression |
| 2 | 4–6 | 7–11 | Light breeze | Low Pressure Area | Tropical disturbance | Tropical low Tropical Depression | Tropical depression | Tropical depression | Tropical depression |
| 3 | 7–10 | 13–19 | Gentle breeze | Low Pressure Area | Tropical disturbance | Tropical low Tropical Depression | Tropical depression | Tropical depression | Tropical depression |
| 4 | 11–16 | 20–30 | Moderate breeze | Low Pressure Area | Tropical disturbance | Tropical low Tropical Depression | Tropical depression | Tropical depression | Tropical depression |
| 5 | 17–21 | 31–39 | Fresh breeze | Depression | Tropical disturbance | Tropical low Tropical Depression | Tropical depression | Tropical depression | Tropical depression |
| 6 | 22–27 | 41–50 | Strong breeze | Depression | Tropical disturbance | Tropical low Tropical Depression | Tropical depression | Tropical depression | Tropical depression |
| 7 | 28–29 | 52–54 | Moderate gale | Deep depression | Tropical depression | Tropical low Tropical Depression | Tropical depression | Tropical depression | Tropical depression |
| 7 | 30–33 | 56–61 | Moderate gale | Deep depression | Tropical depression | Tropical low Tropical Depression | Tropical depression | Tropical depression | Tropical depression |
| 8 | 34–40 | 63–74 | Fresh gale | Cyclonic storm | Moderate tropical storm | Tropical cyclone (1) | Tropical storm | Tropical storm | Tropical storm |
| 9 | 41–47 | 76–87 | Strong gale | Cyclonic storm | Moderate tropical storm | Tropical cyclone (1) | Tropical storm | Tropical storm | Tropical storm |
| 10 | 48–55 | 89–102 | Whole gale | Severe cyclonic storm | Severe tropical storm | Tropical cyclone (2) | Severe tropical storm | Tropical storm | Tropical storm |
| 11 | 56–63 | 104–117 | Storm | Severe cyclonic storm | Severe tropical storm | Tropical cyclone (2) | Severe tropical storm | Tropical storm | Tropical storm |
| 12 | 64–72 | 119–133 | Hurricane | Very severe cyclonic storm | Tropical cyclone | Severe tropical cyclone (3) | Typhoon | Typhoon | Hurricane (1) |
| 13 | 73–85 | 135–157 | Hurricane | Very severe cyclonic storm | Tropical cyclone | Severe tropical cyclone (3) | Typhoon | Typhoon | Hurricane (2) |
| 14 | 86–89 | 159–165 | Hurricane | Very severe cyclonic storm | Tropical cyclone | Severe tropical cyclone (4) | Typhoon | Typhoon | Major hurricane (3) |
| 15 | 90–99 | 167–183 | Hurricane | Very severe cyclonic storm | Intense tropical cyclone | Severe tropical cyclone (4) | Typhoon | Typhoon | Major hurricane (3) |
| 16 | 100–106 | 185–196 | Hurricane | Very severe cyclonic storm | Intense tropical cyclone | Severe tropical cyclone (4) | Typhoon | Typhoon | Major hurricane (4) |
| 17 | 107–114 | 198–211 | Hurricane | Very severe cyclonic storm | Intense tropical cyclone | Severe tropical cyclone (5) | Typhoon | Typhoon | Major hurricane (4) |
| 17 | 115–119 | 213–220 | Hurricane | Very severe cyclonic storm | Very intense tropical cyclone | Severe tropical cyclone (5) | Typhoon | Super typhoon | Major hurricane (4) |
| 17 | >120 | >222 | Hurricane | Super cyclonic storm | Very intense tropical cyclone | Severe tropical cyclone (5) | Typhoon | Super typhoon | Major hurricane (5) |

=== Enhanced Fujita scale ===
The Enhanced Fujita Scale (EF Scale) rates the strength of tornadoes by using damage to estimate wind speed. It has six levels, from visible damage to complete destruction. It is used in the United States and in some other countries, including Canada and France, with small modifications.

=== Station model ===
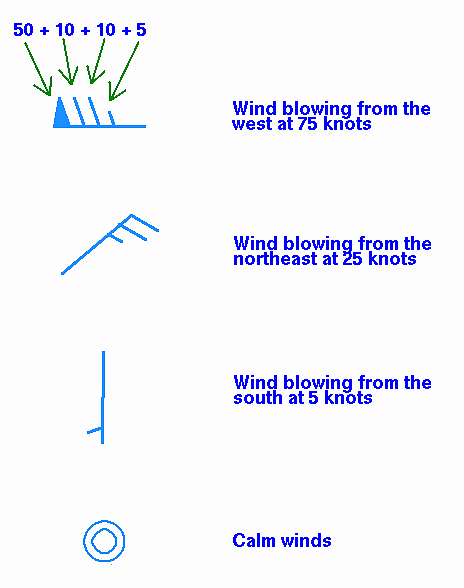
Wind plotting within a station model

The station model plotted on surface weather maps uses a wind barb to show both wind direction and speed. The wind barb shows the speed using "flags" on the end.

- Each half of a flag depicts 5 knots (9.3 km/h; 5.8 mph) of wind.
- Each full flag depicts 10 knots (19 km/h; 12 mph) of wind.
- Each pennant (filled triangle) depicts 50 knots (93 km/h; 58 mph) of wind.

Winds are depicted as blowing from the direction the barb is facing. Therefore, a northeast wind will be depicted with a line extending from the cloud circle to the northeast, with flags indicating wind speed on the northeast end of this line. Once plotted on a map, an analysis of isotachs (lines of equal wind speeds) can be accomplished. Isotachs are particularly useful in diagnosing the location of the jet stream on upper-level constant pressure charts, and are usually located at or above the 300 hPa level.

== Global climatology ==
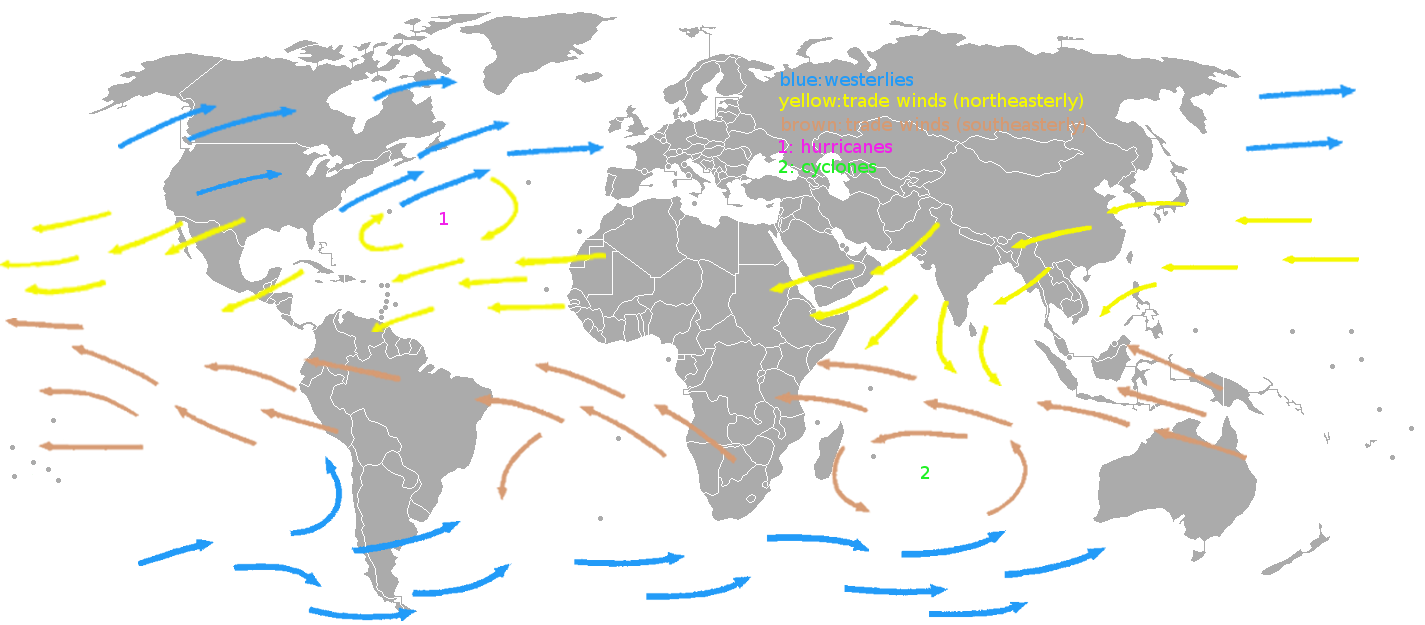
The westerlies and trade winds

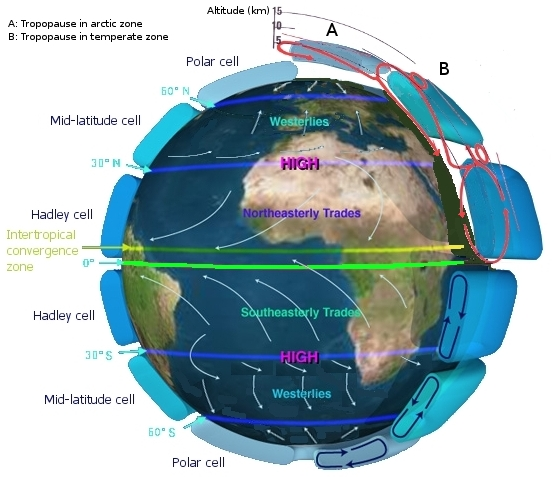
Winds are part of Earth's atmospheric circulation

Easterly winds, on average, dominate the flow pattern across the poles, westerly winds blow across the mid-latitudes of the Earth, polewards of the subtropical ridge, while easterlies again dominate the tropics.

Directly under the subtropical ridge are the doldrums, or horse latitudes, where winds are lighter. Many of the Earth's deserts lie near the average latitude of the subtropical ridge, where descent reduces the relative humidity of the air mass. The strongest winds are in the mid-latitudes where cold polar air meets warm air from the tropics.

=== Tropics ===
The trade winds (also called trades) are the prevailing pattern of easterly surface winds found in the tropics towards the Earth's equator. The trade winds blow predominantly from the northeast in the Northern Hemisphere and from the southeast in the Southern Hemisphere. The trade winds act as the steering flow for tropical cyclones that form over the world's oceans. Trade winds also steer African dust westward across the Atlantic Ocean into the Caribbean, as well as portions of southeast North America.

A monsoon is a seasonal prevailing wind that lasts for several months within tropical regions. The term was first used in English in India, Bangladesh, Pakistan, and neighboring countries to refer to the big seasonal winds blowing from the Indian Ocean and Arabian Sea in the southwest bringing heavy rainfall to the area. Its poleward progression is accelerated by the development of a heat low over the Asian, African, and North American continents during May through July, and over Australia in December.

=== Westerlies and their impact ===
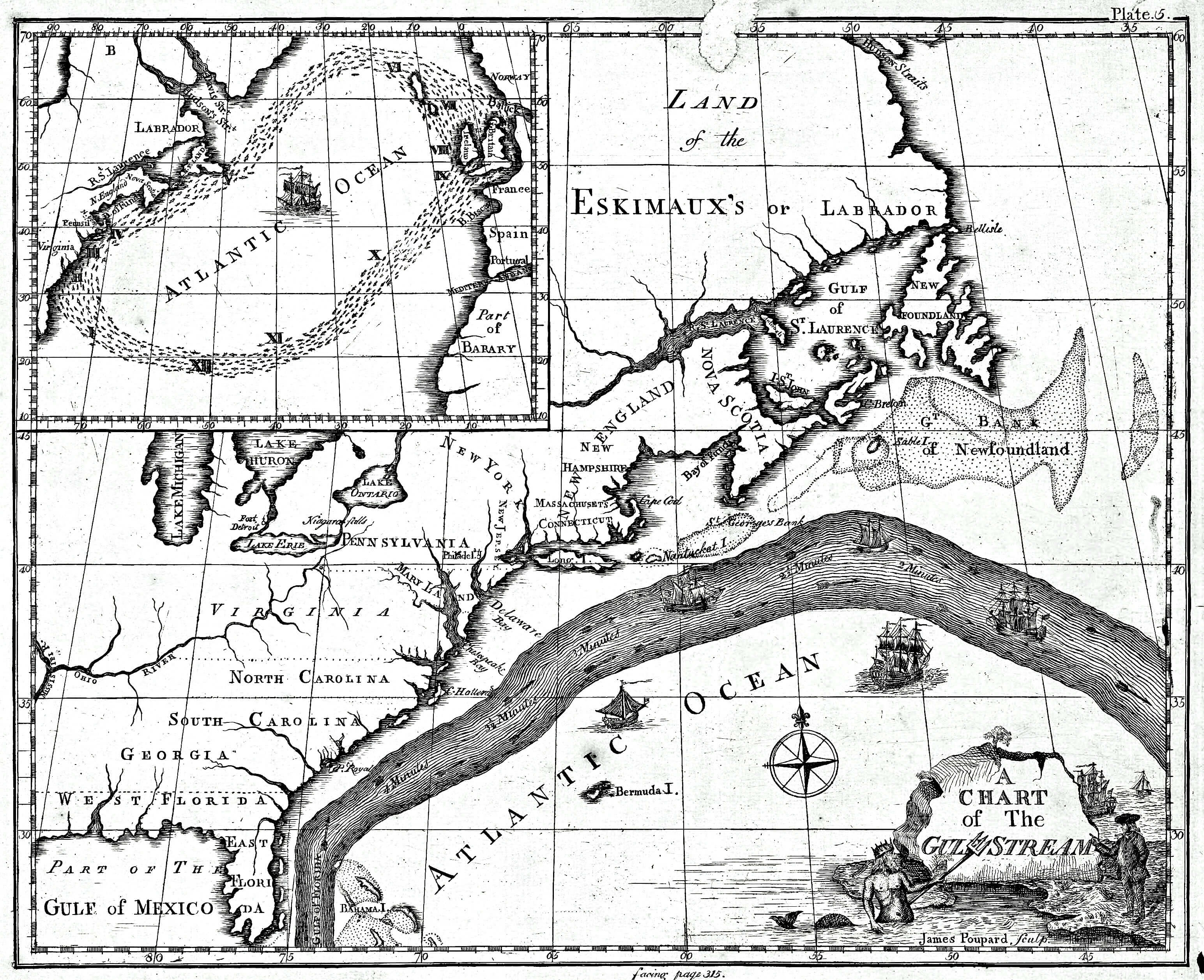
Benjamin Franklin's map of the Gulf Stream

The Westerlies or the Prevailing Westerlies are the prevailing winds in the middle latitudes between 35 and 65 degrees latitude. These prevailing winds blow from the west to the east, and steer extratropical cyclones in this general manner. The winds are predominantly from the southwest in the Northern Hemisphere and from the northwest in the Southern Hemisphere. They are strongest in the winter when the pressure is lower over the poles, and weakest during the summer and when pressures are higher over the poles.

Together with the trade winds, the westerlies enabled a round-trip trade route for sailing ships crossing the Atlantic and Pacific Oceans, as the westerlies lead to the development of strong ocean currents on the western sides of oceans in both hemispheres through the process of western intensification. These western ocean currents transport warm, sub-tropical water polewards toward the polar regions. The westerlies can be particularly strong, especially in the southern hemisphere, where there is less land in the middle latitudes to cause the flow pattern to amplify, which slows the winds down. The strongest westerly winds in the middle latitudes are within a band known as the Roaring Forties, between 40 and 50 degrees latitude south of the equator. The Westerlies play an important role in carrying the warm, equatorial waters and winds to the western coasts of continents, especially in the southern hemisphere because of its vast oceanic expanse.

=== Polar easterlies ===
The polar easterlies, also known as Polar Hadley cells, are dry, cold prevailing winds that blow from the high-pressure areas of the polar highs at the north and South Poles towards the low-pressure areas within the Westerlies at high latitudes. Unlike the Westerlies, these prevailing winds blow from the east to the west, and are often weak and irregular. Because of the low sun angle, cold air builds up and subsides at the pole creating surface high-pressure areas, forcing an equatorward outflow of air; that outflow is deflected westward by the Coriolis effect.

== Local considerations ==
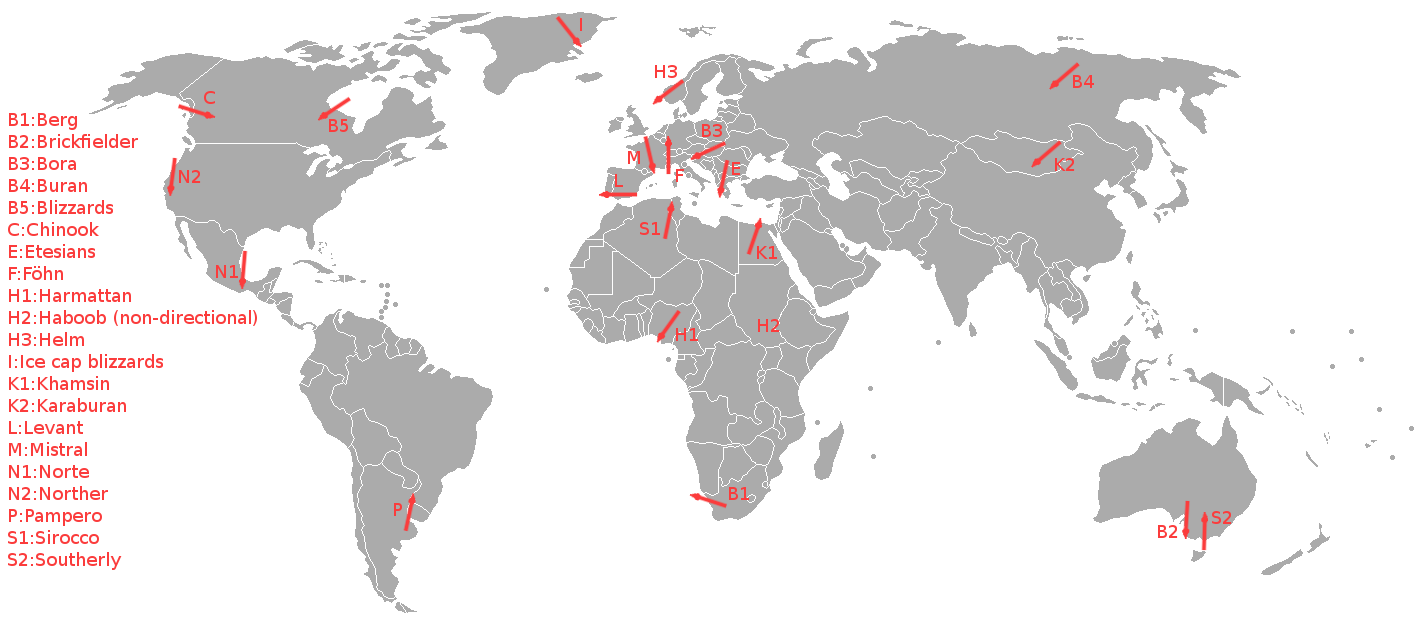
Local winds around the world. These winds are formed through the heating of land (from mountains or flat terrain)

=== Sea and land breezes ===
A: Sea breeze (occurs at daytime) B: Land breeze (occurs at nighttime)

In coastal regions, sea breezes and land breezes can be important factors in a location's prevailing winds. The sea is warmed by the sun more slowly because of water's greater specific heat compared to land. As the temperature of the surface of the land rises, the land heats the air above it by conduction. The warm air is less dense than the surrounding environment and so it rises. The cooler air above the sea, now with higher sea level pressure, flows inland into the lower pressure, creating a cooler breeze near the coast. A background along-shore wind either strengthens or weakens the sea breeze, depending on its orientation with respect to the Coriolis force.

At night, the land cools off more quickly than the ocean because of differences in their specific heat values. This temperature change causes the daytime sea breeze to dissipate. When the temperature onshore cools below the temperature offshore, the pressure over the water will be lower than that of the land, establishing a land breeze, as long as an onshore wind is not strong enough to oppose it.

=== Near mountains ===
Mountain wave schematic. The wind flows towards a mountain and produces a first oscillation (A). A second wave occurs further away and higher. The lenticular clouds form at the peak of the waves (B).

Over elevated surfaces, heating of the ground exceeds the heating of the surrounding air at the same altitude above sea level, creating an associated thermal low over the terrain and enhancing any thermal lows that would have otherwise existed, and changing the wind circulation of the region. In areas where there is rugged topography that significantly interrupts the environmental wind flow, the wind circulation between mountains and valleys is the most important contributor to the prevailing winds. Hills and valleys substantially distort the airflow by increasing friction between the atmosphere and landmass by acting as a physical block to the flow, deflecting the wind parallel to the range just upstream of the topography, which is known as a barrier jet. This barrier jet can increase the low-level wind by 45%. Wind direction also changes because of the contour of the land.

If there is a pass in the mountain range, winds will rush through the pass with considerable speed because of Bernoulli's principle that describes an inverse relationship between speed and pressure. The airflow can remain turbulent and erratic for some distance downwind into the flatter countryside. These conditions are dangerous to ascending and descending airplanes. Cool winds accelerating through mountain gaps have been given regional names. In Central America, examples include the Papagayo wind, the Panama wind, and the Tehuano wind. In Europe, similar winds are known as the Bora, Tramontane, and Mistral. When these winds blow over open waters, they increase mixing of the upper layers of the ocean that elevates cool, nutrient rich waters to the surface, which leads to increased marine life.

In mountainous areas, local distortion of the airflow becomes severe. Jagged terrain combines to produce unpredictable flow patterns and turbulence, such as rotors, which can be topped by lenticular clouds. Strong updrafts, downdrafts, and eddies develop as the air flows over hills and down valleys. Orographic precipitation occurs on the windward side of mountains and is caused by the rising air motion of a large-scale flow of moist air across the mountain ridge, also known as upslope flow, resulting in adiabatic cooling and condensation. In mountainous parts of the world subjected to relatively consistent winds (for example, the trade winds), a more moist climate usually prevails on the windward side of a mountain than on the leeward or downwind side. Moisture is removed by orographic lift, leaving drier air on the descending and generally warming, leeward side where a rain shadow is observed.

Winds that flow over mountains down into lower elevations are known as downslope winds. These winds are warm and dry. In Europe downwind of the Alps, they are known as foehn. In Poland, an example is the halny wiatr. In Argentina, the local name for down sloped winds is zonda. In Java, the local name for such winds is koembang. In New Zealand, they are known as the Nor'west arch, and are accompanied by the cloud formation they are named after that has inspired artwork over the years. In the Great Plains of the United States, these winds are known as a chinook. Downslope winds also occur in the foothills of the Appalachian mountains of the United States, and they can be as strong as other downslope winds and unusual compared to other foehn winds in that the relative humidity typically changes little due to the increased moisture in the source air mass. In California, downslope winds are funneled through mountain passes, which intensify their effect, and examples include the Santa Ana and sundowner winds. Wind speeds during downslope wind effect can exceed 160 kilometers per hour (99 mph).

== Shear ==
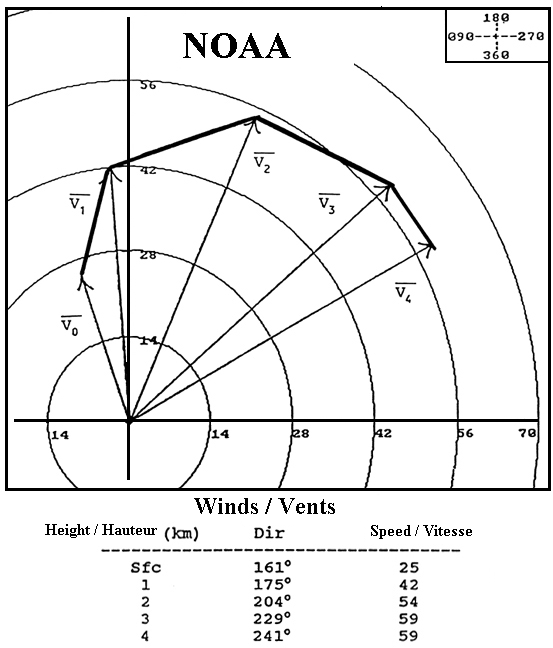
Hodograph plot of wind vectors at various heights in the troposphere, which is used to diagnose vertical wind shear

Wind shear, sometimes referred to as wind gradient, is a difference in wind speed and direction over a relatively short distance in the Earth's atmosphere. Wind shear can be broken down into vertical and horizontal components, with horizontal wind shear seen across weather fronts and near the coast, and vertical shear typically near the surface, though also at higher levels in the atmosphere near upper level jets and frontal zones aloft.

Wind shear itself is a microscale meteorological phenomenon occurring over a very small distance, but it can be associated with mesoscale or synoptic scale weather features such as squall lines and cold fronts. It is commonly observed near microbursts and downbursts caused by thunderstorms, weather fronts, areas of locally higher low level winds referred to as low level jets, near mountains, radiation inversions that occur because of clear skies and calm winds, buildings, wind turbines, and sailboats. Wind shear has a significant effect on the control of aircraft during take-off and landing, and was a significant cause of aircraft accidents involving large loss of life within the United States.

Sound movement through the atmosphere is affected by wind shear, which can bend the wave front, causing sounds to be heard where they normally would not, or vice versa. Strong vertical wind shear within the troposphere also inhibits tropical cyclone development, but helps to organize individual thunderstorms into living longer life cycles that can then produce severe weather. The thermal wind concept explains how differences in wind speed with height are dependent on horizontal temperature differences, and explains the existence of the jet stream.

== In civilization ==
=== Religion ===
As a natural force, the wind was often personified as one or more wind gods or as an expression of the supernatural in many cultures. Vayu is the Vedic and Hindu God of Wind. The Greek wind gods include Boreas, Notus, Eurus, and Zephyrus. Aeolus, in varying interpretations the ruler or keeper of the four winds, has also been described as Astraeus, the god of dusk who fathered the four winds with Eos, goddess of dawn. The ancient Greeks also observed the seasonal change of the winds, as evidenced by the Tower of the Winds in Athens. Venti are the Roman gods of the winds. Fūjin is the Japanese wind god and is one of the eldest Shinto gods. According to legend, he was present at the creation of the world and first let the winds out of his bag to clear the world of mist. In Norse mythology, Njörðr is the god of the wind. There are also four dvärgar (Norse dwarves), named Norðri, Suðri, Austri and Vestri, and probably the four stags of Yggdrasil, personify the four winds, and parallel the four Greek wind gods. Stribog is the name of the Slavic god of winds, sky and air. He is said to be the ancestor (grandfather) of the winds of the eight directions. In Māori mythology, Tāwhirimātea (or Tāwhiri) is the god of weather, including thunder and lightning, wind, clouds and storms. In the Yoruba pantheon, Ọya (also known as Iansã) is the orisha of winds, lightning, and storms.

=== History ===
Kamikaze is a Japanese word, usually translated as divine wind, believed to be a gift from the gods. The term is first known to have been used as the name of a pair or series of typhoons that are said to have saved Japan from two Mongol fleets under Kublai Khan that attacked Japan in 1274 and again in 1281. Protestant Wind is a name for the storm that deterred the Spanish Armada from an invasion of England in 1588 where the wind played a pivotal role, or the favorable winds that enabled William of Orange to invade England in 1688. During Napoleon's Egyptian Campaign, the French soldiers had a hard time with the khamsin wind: when the storm appeared "as a blood-stint in the distant sky", the Ottomans went to take cover, while the French "did not react until it was too late, then choked and fainted in the blinding, suffocating walls of dust". During the North African campaign of the World War II, "allied and German troops were several times forced to halt in mid-battle because of sandstorms caused by khamsin... Grains of sand whirled by the wind blinded the soldiers and created electrical disturbances that rendered compasses useless."

=== Transportation ===
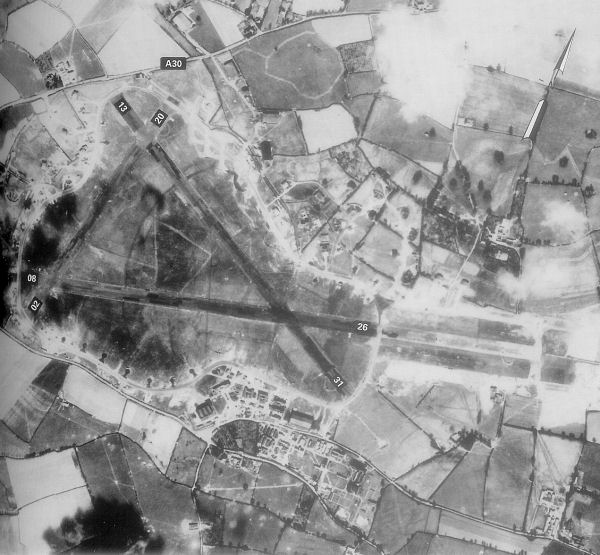
RAF Exeter airfield on 20 May 1944, showing the layout of the runways that allow aircraft to take off and land into the wind

There are many different forms of sailing ships, but they all have certain basic things in common. Except for rotor ships using the Magnus effect, every sailing ship has a hull, rigging and at least one mast to hold up the sails that use the wind to power the ship. Ocean journeys by sailing ship can take many months, and a common hazard is becoming becalmed because of lack of wind, or being blown off course by severe storms or winds that do not allow progress in the desired direction. A severe storm could lead to shipwreck, and the loss of all hands. Sailing ships can only carry a certain quantity of supplies in their hold, so they have to plan long voyages carefully to include appropriate provisions, including fresh water.

For aerodynamic aircraft which operate relative to the air, winds affect groundspeed, and in the case of lighter-than-air vehicles, wind may play a significant or solitary role in their movement and ground track. The velocity of surface wind is generally the primary factor governing the direction of flight operations at an airport, and airfield runways are aligned to account for the common wind direction(s) of the local area. While taking off with a tailwind may be necessary under certain circumstances, a headwind is generally desirable. A tailwind increases takeoff distance required and decreases the climb gradient.

=== Power source ===
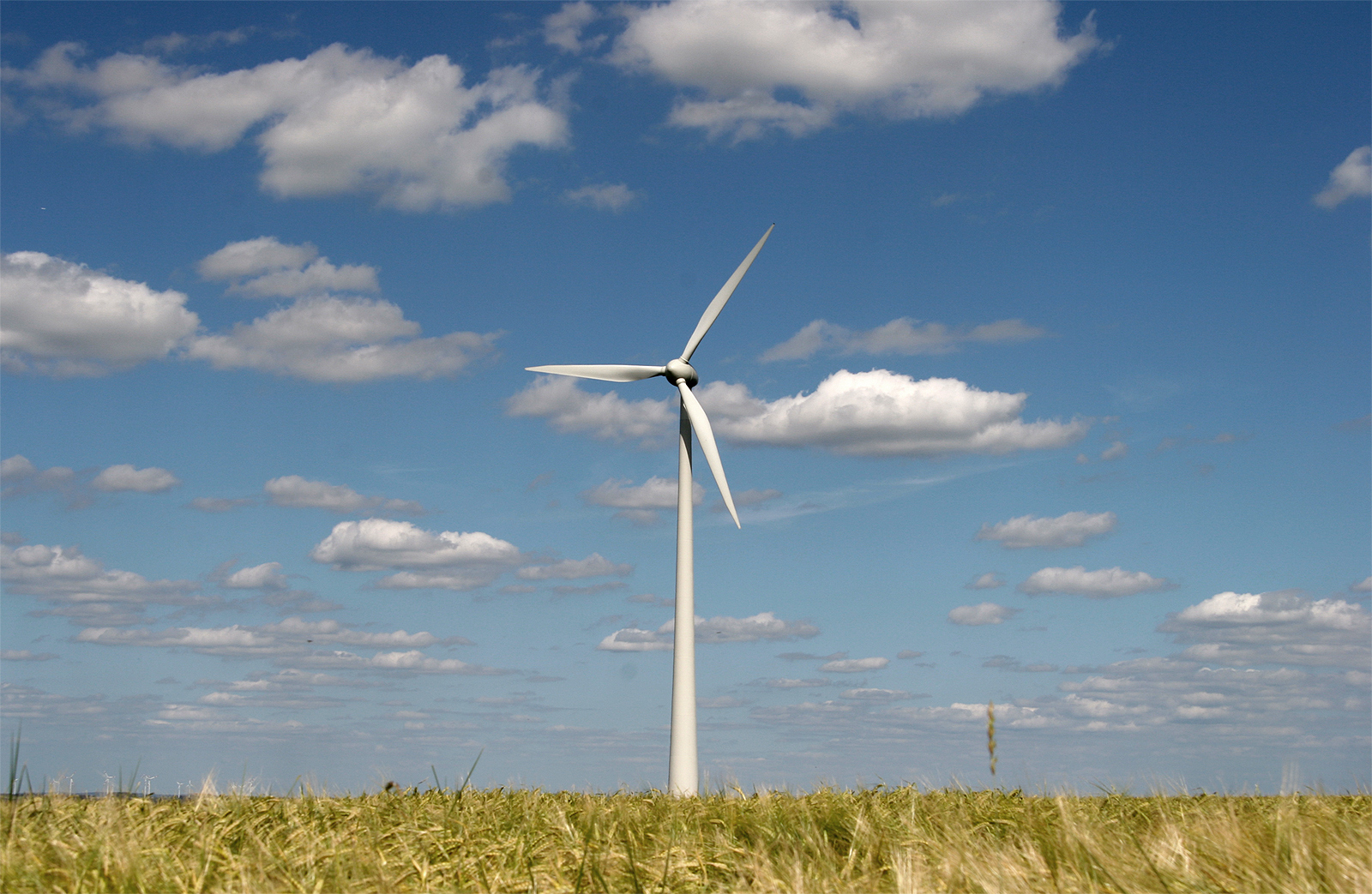
This wind turbine generates electricity from wind power.

The ancient Sinhalese of Anuradhapura and in other cities around Sri Lanka used the monsoon winds to power furnaces as early as 300 BCE. The furnaces were constructed on the path of the monsoon winds to bring the temperatures inside up to 1,200 °C (2,190 °F). A rudimentary windmill was used to power an organ in the first century CE. Windmills were later built in Sistan, Afghanistan, from the 7th century CE. These were vertical-axle windmills, with sails covered in reed matting or cloth material. These windmills were used to grind corn and draw up water, and were used in the gristmilling and sugarcane industries. Horizontal-axle windmills were later used extensively in Northwestern Europe to grind flour beginning in the 1180s, and many Dutch windmills still exist.

Wind power is now one of the main sources of renewable energy, and its use is growing rapidly, driven by innovation and falling prices. Most of the installed capacity in wind power is onshore, but offshore wind power offers a large potential as wind speeds are typically higher and more constant away from the coast. Wind energy the kinetic energy of the air, is proportional to the third power of wind velocity. Betz's law described the theoretical upper limit of what fraction of this energy wind turbines can extract, which is about 59%.

=== Metallurgy ===
In Pre-Hispanic times and historically wind has been used in the Andean huayra furnaces to drive the combustion used in metal smelting.

=== Recreation ===
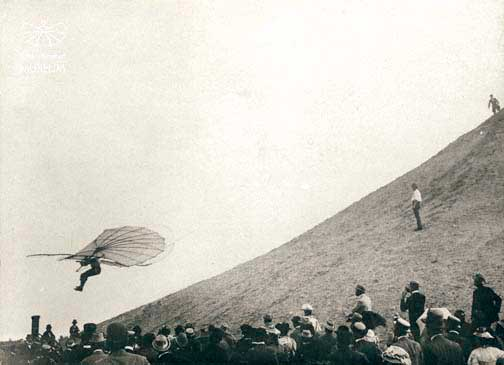
Otto Lilienthal in flight

Wind figures prominently in several popular sports, including recreational hang gliding, hot air ballooning, kite flying, snowkiting, kite landboarding, kite surfing, paragliding, sailing, and windsurfing. In gliding, wind gradients just above the surface affect the takeoff and landing phases of flight of a glider. Wind gradient can have a noticeable effect on ground launches, also known as winch launches or wire launches. If the wind gradient is significant or sudden, or both, and the pilot maintains the same pitch attitude, the indicated airspeed will increase, possibly exceeding the maximum ground launch tow speed. The pilot must adjust the airspeed to deal with the effect of the gradient. When landing, wind shear is also a hazard, particularly when the winds are strong. As the glider descends through the wind gradient on final approach to landing, airspeed decreases while sink rate increases, and there is insufficient time to accelerate prior to ground contact. The pilot must anticipate the wind gradient and use a higher approach speed to compensate for it.

== In the natural world ==
In arid climates, the main source of erosion is wind. The general wind circulation moves small particulates such as dust across wide oceans thousands of kilometers downwind of their point of origin, which is known as deflation. Westerly winds in the mid-latitudes of the planet drive the movement of ocean currents from west to east across the world's oceans. Wind has a very important role in aiding plants and other immobile organisms in dispersal of seeds, spores, pollen, etc. Although wind is not the primary form of seed dispersal in plants, it provides dispersal for a large percentage of the biomass of land plants.

=== Erosion ===
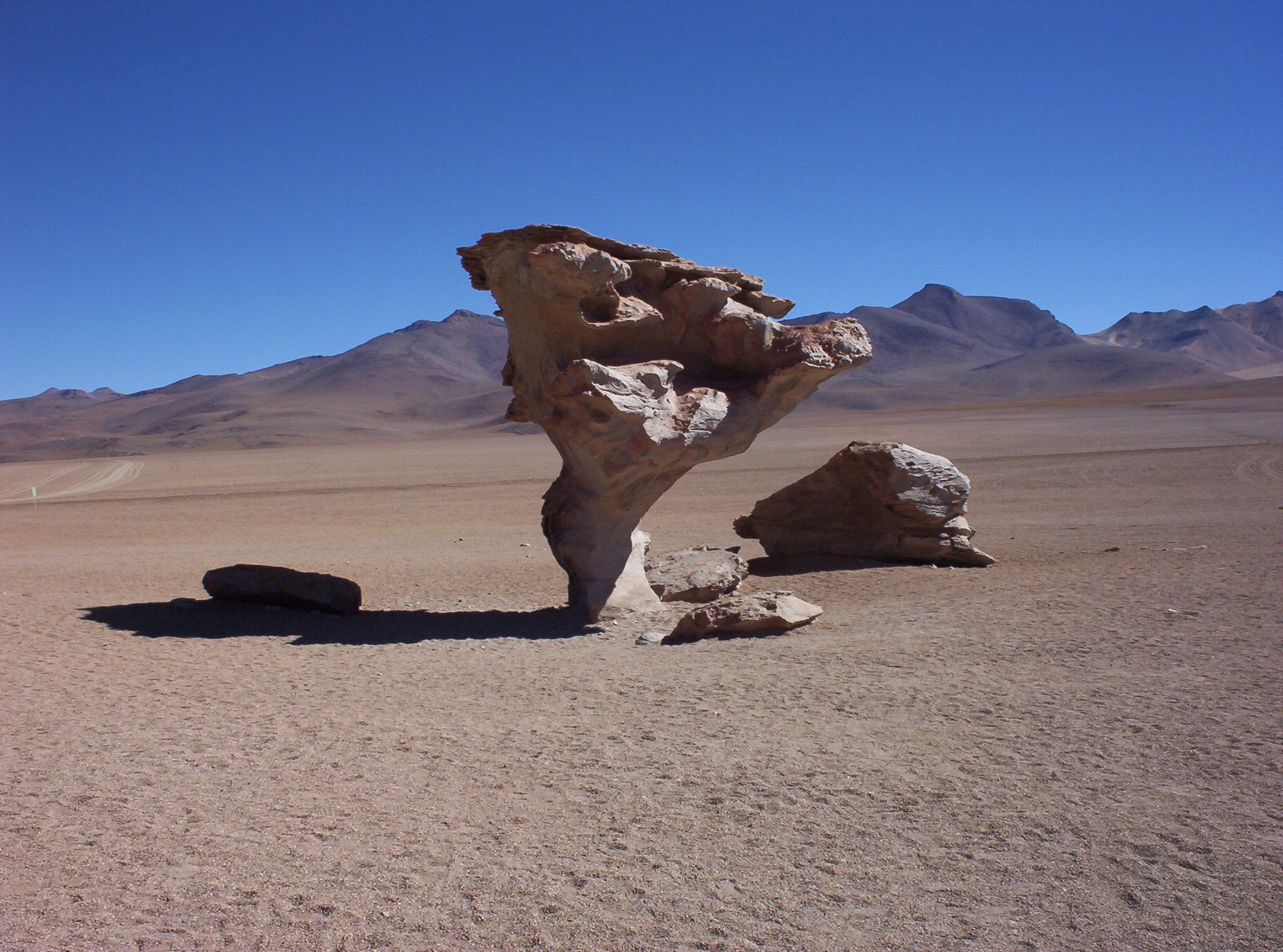
A rock formation in the Altiplano, Bolivia, sculpted by wind erosion

Erosion can be the result of material movement by the wind. There are two main effects. First, wind causes small particles to be lifted and therefore moved to another region. This is called deflation. Second, these suspended particles may impact on solid objects causing erosion by abrasion (ecological succession). Wind erosion generally occurs in areas with little or no vegetation, often in areas where there is insufficient rainfall to support vegetation. An example is the formation of sand dunes, on a beach or in a desert. Loess is a homogeneous, typically nonstratified, porous, friable, slightly coherent, often calcareous, fine-grained, silty, pale yellow or buff, windblown (Aeolian) sediment. It generally occurs as a widespread blanket deposit that covers areas of hundreds of square kilometers and tens of meters thick. Loess often stands in either steep or vertical faces. Loess tends to develop into highly rich soils. Under appropriate climatic conditions, areas with loess are among the most agriculturally productive in the world. Loess deposits are geologically unstable by nature, and will erode very readily. Therefore, windbreaks (such as big trees and bushes) are often planted by farmers to reduce the wind erosion of loess.

=== Desert dust migration ===
During mid-summer (July in the northern hemisphere), the westward-moving trade winds south of the northward-moving subtropical ridge expand northwestward from the Caribbean into southeastern North America. When dust from the Sahara moving around the southern periphery of the ridge within the belt of trade winds moves over land, rainfall is suppressed and the sky changes from a blue to a white appearance, which leads to an increase in red sunsets. Its presence negatively impacts air quality by adding to the count of airborne particulates. Over 50% of the African dust that reaches the United States affects Florida. Since 1970, dust outbreaks have worsened because of periods of drought in Africa. There is a large variability in the dust transport to the Caribbean and Florida from year to year. Dust events have been linked to a decline in the health of coral reefs across the Caribbean and Florida, primarily since the 1970s. Similar dust plumes originate in the Gobi Desert, which combined with pollutants, spread large distances downwind, or eastward, into North America.

There are local names for winds associated with sand and dust storms. The Calima carries dust on southeast winds into the Canary Islands. The Harmattan carries dust during the winter into the Gulf of Guinea. The Sirocco brings dust from north Africa into southern Europe because of the movement of extratropical cyclones through the Mediterranean. Spring storm systems moving across the eastern Mediterranean Sea cause dust to carry across Egypt and the Arabian Peninsula, which are locally known as Khamsin. The Shamal is caused by cold fronts lifting dust into the atmosphere for days at a time across the Persian Gulf states.

=== Effect on plants ===
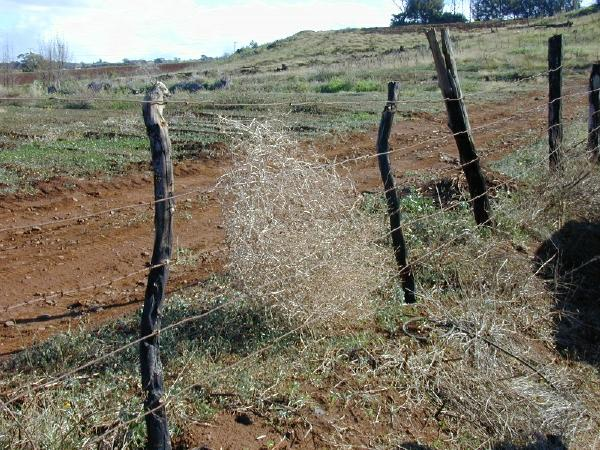
Tumbleweed blown against a fence

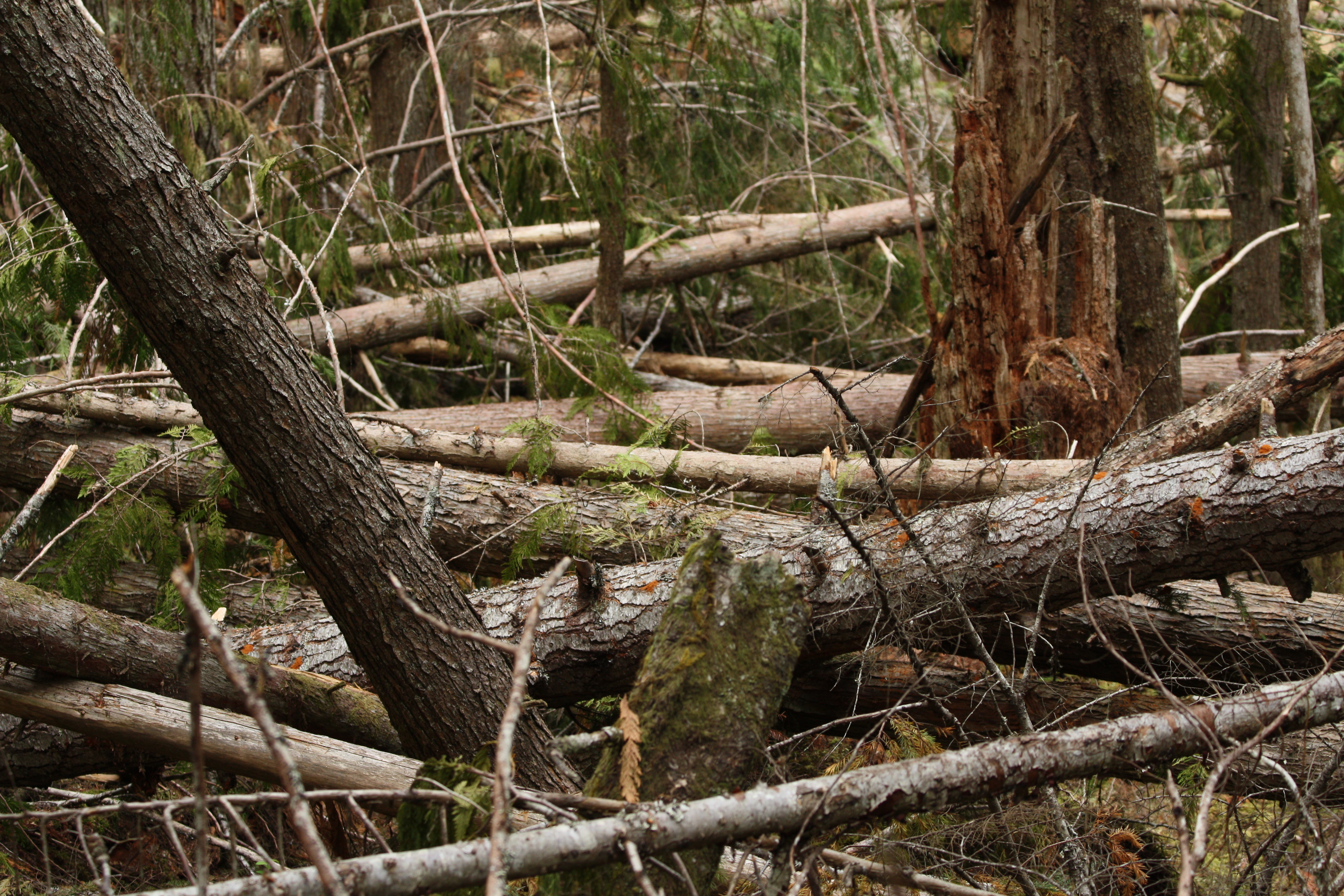
In the montane forest of Olympic National Park, windthrow opens the canopy and increases light intensity on the understory.

Wind dispersal of seeds, or anemochory, is one of the more primitive means of dispersal. Wind dispersal can take on one of two primary forms: seeds can float on the breeze or alternatively, they can flutter to the ground. The classic examples of these dispersal mechanisms include dandelions (Taraxacum spp., Asteraceae), which have a feathery pappus attached to their seeds and can be dispersed long distances, and maples (Acer (genus) spp., Sapindaceae), which have winged seeds and flutter to the ground. An important constraint on wind dispersal is the need for abundant seed production to maximize the likelihood of a seed landing in a site suitable for germination. There are also strong evolutionary constraints on this dispersal mechanism. For instance, species in the Asteraceae on islands tended to have reduced dispersal capabilities (i.e., larger seed mass and smaller pappus) relative to the same species on the mainland. Reliance upon wind dispersal is common among many weedy or ruderal species. Unusual mechanisms of wind dispersal include tumbleweeds. A related process to anemochory is anemophily, which is the process where pollen is distributed by wind. Large families of plants are pollinated in this manner, which is favored when individuals of the dominant plant species are spaced closely together.

Wind also limits tree growth. On coasts and isolated mountains, the tree line is often much lower than in corresponding altitudes inland and in larger, more complex mountain systems, because strong winds reduce tree growth. High winds scour away thin soils through erosion, as well as damage limbs and twigs. When high winds knock down or uproot trees, the process is known as windthrow. This is most likely on windward slopes of mountains, with severe cases generally occurring to tree stands that are 75 years or older. Plant varieties near the coast, such as the Sitka spruce and sea grape, are pruned back by wind and salt spray near the coastline.

Wind can also cause plants damage through sand abrasion. Strong winds will pick up loose sand and topsoil and hurl it through the air at speeds ranging from 25 miles per hour (40 km/h) to 40 miles per hour (64 km/h). Such windblown sand causes extensive damage to plant seedlings because it ruptures plant cells, making them vulnerable to evaporation and drought. Using a mechanical sandblaster in a laboratory setting, scientists affiliated with the Agricultural Research Service studied the effects of windblown sand abrasion on cotton seedlings. The study showed that the seedlings responded to the damage created by the windblown sand abrasion by shifting energy from stem and root growth to the growth and repair of the damaged stems. After a period of four weeks, the growth of the seedling once again became uniform throughout the plant, as it was before the windblown sand abrasion occurred.

Besides plant gametes (seeds) wind also helps plants' enemies: Spores and other propagules of plant pathogens are even lighter and able to travel long distances. A few plant diseases are known to have been known to travel over marginal seas and even entire oceans. Humans are unable to prevent or even slow down wind dispersal of plant pathogens, requiring prediction and amelioration instead.

=== Effect on animals ===
Cattle and sheep are prone to wind chill caused by a combination of wind and cold temperatures, when winds exceed 40 kilometers per hour (25 mph), rendering their hair and wool coverings ineffective. Although penguins use both a layer of fat and feathers to help guard against coldness in both water and air, their flippers and feet are less immune to the cold. In the coldest climates such as Antarctica, emperor penguins use huddling behavior to survive the wind and cold, continuously alternating the members on the outside of the assembled group, which reduces heat loss by 50%. Flying insects, a subset of arthropods, are swept along by the prevailing winds, while birds follow their own course taking advantage of wind conditions, in order to either fly or glide. As such, fine line patterns within weather radar imagery, associated with converging winds, are dominated by insect returns. Bird migration, which tends to occur overnight within the lowest 7,000 feet (2,100 m) of the Earth's atmosphere, contaminates wind profiles gathered by weather radar, particularly the WSR-88D, by increasing the environmental wind returns by 15 knots (28 km/h) to 30 knots (56 km/h).

Pikas use a wall of pebbles to store dry plants and grasses for the winter in order to protect the food from being blown away. Cockroaches use slight winds that precede the attacks of potential predators, such as toads, to survive their encounters. Their cerci are very sensitive to the wind, and help them survive half of their attacks. Elk have a keen sense of smell that can detect potential upwind predators at a distance of 0.5 miles (800 m). Increases in wind above 15 kilometers per hour (9.3 mph) signals glaucous gulls to increase their foraging and aerial attacks on thick-billed murres.

== Related damage ==
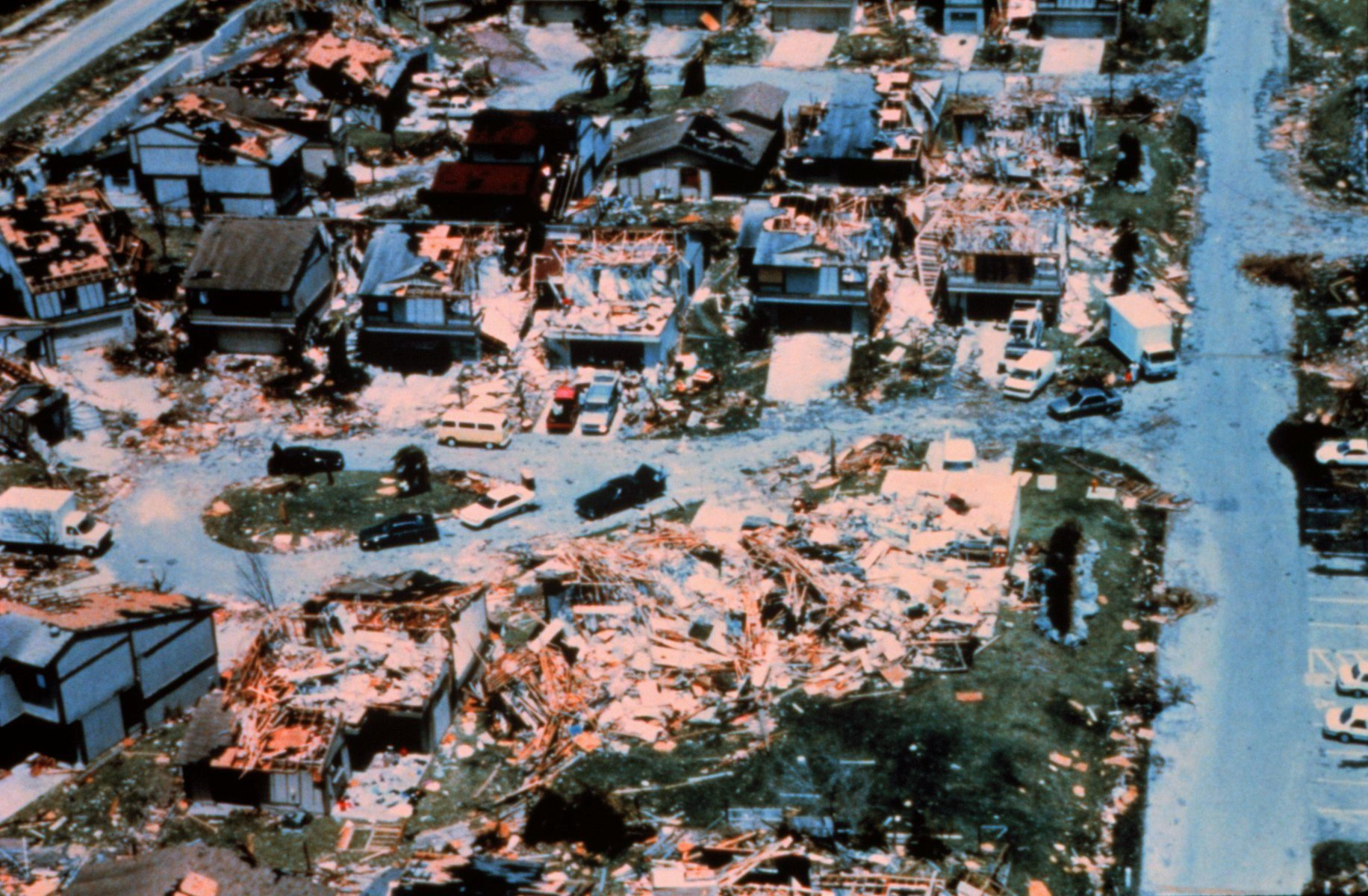
Damage from Hurricane Andrew

High winds are known to cause damage, depending upon the magnitude of their velocity and pressure differential. Wind pressures are positive on the windward side of a structure and negative on the leeward side. Infrequent wind gusts can cause poorly designed suspension bridges to sway. When wind gusts are at a similar frequency to the swaying of the bridge, the bridge can be destroyed more easily, such as what occurred with the Tacoma Narrows Bridge in 1940. Wind speeds as low as 23 knots (43 km/h) can lead to power outages due to tree branches disrupting the flow of energy through power lines. While no species of tree is guaranteed to stand up to hurricane-force winds, those with shallow roots are more prone to uproot, and brittle trees such as eucalyptus, sea hibiscus, and avocado are more prone to damage. Hurricane-force winds cause substantial damage to mobile homes, and begin to structurally damage homes with foundations. Winds of this strength due to downsloped winds off terrain have been known to shatter windows and sandblast paint from cars. Once winds exceed 135 knots (250 km/h), homes completely collapse, and significant damage is done to larger buildings. Total destruction to artificial structures occurs when winds reach 175 knots (324 km/h). The Saffir–Simpson scale and Enhanced Fujita scale were designed to help estimate wind speed from the damage caused by high winds related to tropical cyclones and tornadoes, and vice versa.

Australia's Barrow Island holds the record for the strongest wind gust, reaching 408 km/h (253 mph) during tropical Cyclone Olivia on 10 April 1996, surpassing the previous record of 372 km/h (231 mph) set on Mount Washington (New Hampshire) on the afternoon of 12 April 1934.

Wildfire intensity increases during daytime hours. For example, burn rates of smoldering logs are up to five times greater during the day because of lower humidity, increased temperatures, and increased wind speeds. Sunlight warms the ground during the day and causes air currents to travel uphill, and downhill during the night as the land cools. Wildfires are fanned by these winds and often follow the air currents over hills and through valleys. United States wildfire operations revolve around a 24-hour fire day that begins at 10:00 a.m. because of the predictable increase in intensity resulting from the daytime warmth.

== In outer space ==
The solar wind is quite different from a terrestrial wind, in that its origin is the Sun, and it is composed of charged particles that have escaped the Sun's atmosphere. Similar to the solar wind, the planetary wind is composed of light gases that escape planetary atmospheres. Over long periods of time, the planetary wind can radically change the composition of planetary atmospheres.

The fastest wind ever recorded came from the accretion disc of the IGR J17091-3624 black hole. Its speed is 20,000,000 miles per hour (32,000,000 km/h), which is 3% of the speed of light.

=== Planetary wind ===
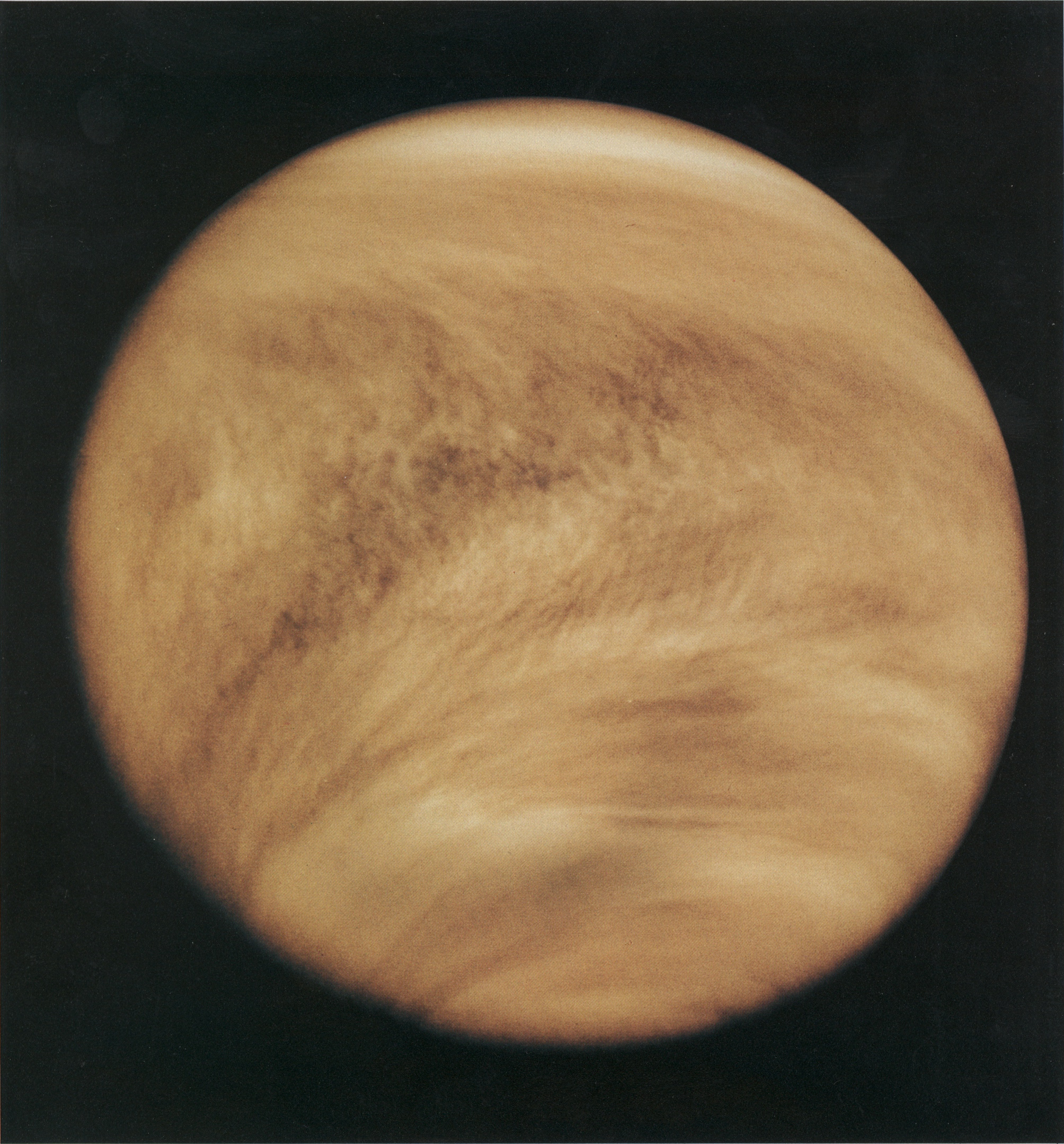
A possible future for Earth due to the planetary wind: Venus

The hydrodynamic wind within the upper portion of a planet's atmosphere allows light chemical elements such as hydrogen to move up to the exobase, the lower limit of the exosphere, where the gases can then reach escape velocity, entering outer space without impacting other particles of gas. This type of gas loss from a planet into space is known as planetary wind. Such a process over geologic time causes water-rich planets such as the Earth to evolve into planets like Venus. Additionally, planets with hotter lower atmospheres could accelerate the loss rate of hydrogen.

=== Solar wind ===
Rather than air, the solar wind is a stream of charged particles—a plasma—ejected from the upper atmosphere of the Sun at a rate of 400 kilometers per second (890,000 mph). It consists mostly of electrons and protons with energies of about 1 keV. The stream of particles varies in temperature and speed with the passage of time. These particles are able to escape the Sun's gravity, in part because of the high temperature of the corona, but also because of high kinetic energy that particles gain through a process that is not well understood. The solar wind creates the Heliosphere, a vast bubble in the interstellar medium surrounding the Solar System. Planets require large magnetic fields in order to reduce the ionization of their upper atmosphere by the solar wind. Other phenomena caused by the solar wind include geomagnetic storms that can knock out power grids on Earth, the aurorae such as the Northern Lights, and the plasma tails of comets that always point away from the Sun.

== On other planets ==
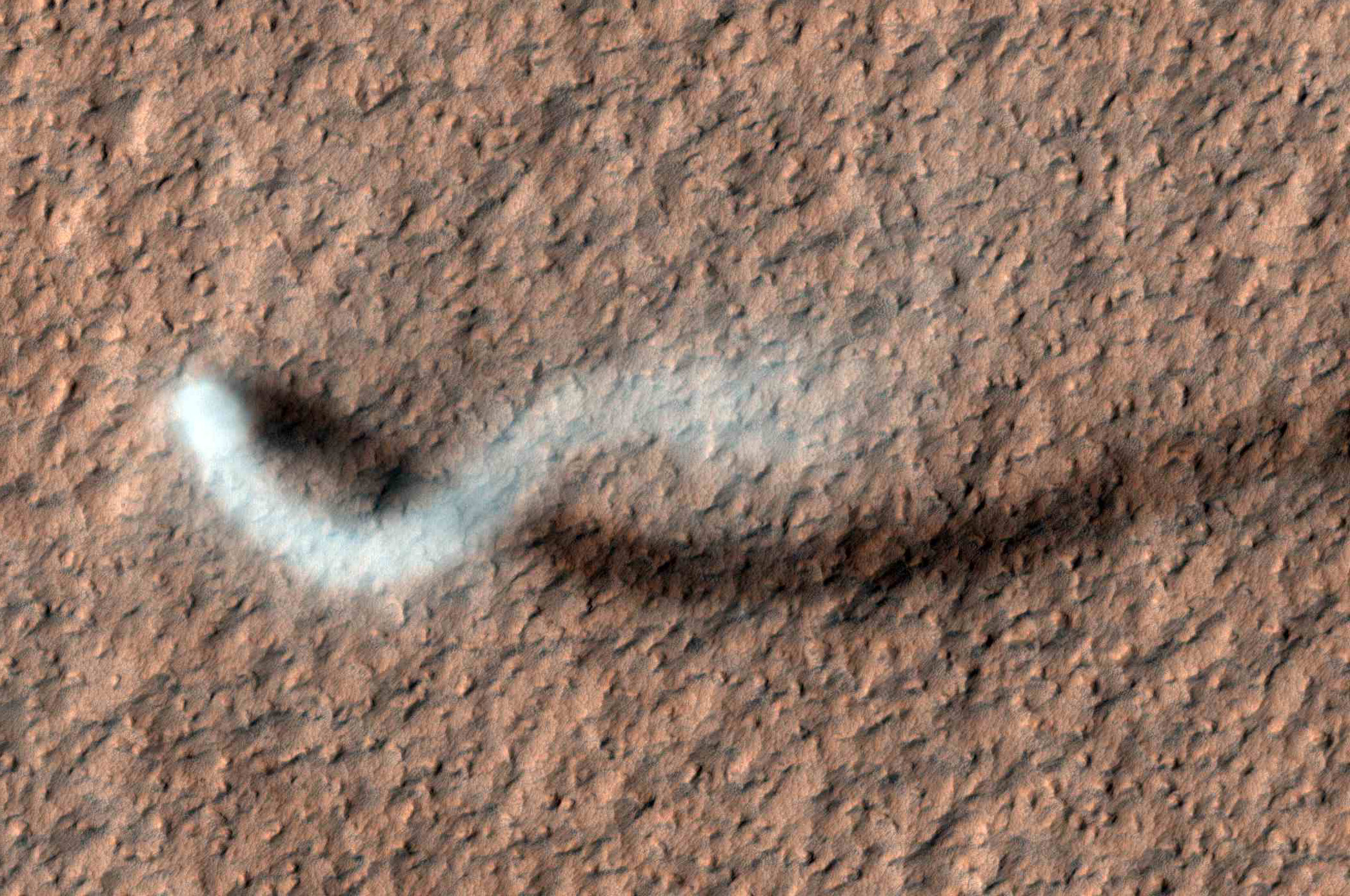
A dust devil on Mars captured by NASA's HiRISE camera

Martian wind recorded by the Perseverance rover

Strong 300 kilometers per hour (190 mph) winds at Venus's cloud tops circle the planet every four to five Earth days. When the poles of Mars are exposed to sunlight after their winter, the frozen CO_{2} sublimates, creating significant winds that sweep off the poles as fast as 400 kilometers per hour (250 mph), which subsequently transports large amounts of dust and water vapor over its landscape. Other Martian winds have resulted in cleaning events and dust devils. On Jupiter, wind speeds of 100 meters per second (220 mph) are common in zonal jet streams. Saturn's winds are among the Solar System's fastest. Cassini–Huygens data indicated peak easterly winds of 375 meters per second (840 mph). On Uranus, northern hemisphere wind speeds reach as high as 240 meters per second (540 mph) near 50 degrees north latitude. At the cloud tops of Neptune, prevailing winds range in speed from 400 meters per second (890 mph) along the equator to 250 meters per second (560 mph) at the poles. At 70° S latitude on Neptune, a high-speed jet stream travels at a speed of 300 meters per second (670 mph). The fastest wind on any known planet is on HD 80606 b, located 190 light years away, where it blows at more than 11,000 mph or 5 km/s.

== See also ==
- Airflow
- Climatology
- Wind advisory
- Wind engineering
- List of local winds
- North wind
- South wind
- West wind
- East wind
