= South wind =

Wind that originates in the south and blows north

A south wind is a wind that originates in the south and blows in a northward direction.

Words used in English to describe the south wind are auster, buster (a violent south gale), föhn/foehn (alps), ghibli (Libya with various spellings), friagem (a cold south wind blowing into Brazil from the Antarctic), khamsin (a hot spring wind in Egypt, with various spellings), kona (stormy southwest wind in Hawaii), notus/lodos (see mythology below for origin) and sirocco (North Africa).

== Mythology ==
In Greek mythology, Notus was the god of the south wind and bringer of the storms of late summer and autumn.

In Roman mythology the south wind was represented by Auster.

In Egyptian mythology, Shehbui is the god of the south wind. He was depicted as a man with the head of a lion.

In Native American Haudenosaunee tradition, the south wind is brought by the Fawn, and has a warm and gentle temperament reminiscent of the sweet flowers, babbling brooks, and the voices of birds of summer.

In Basque mythology, Egoi was a minor deity associated with the south wind.

== See also ==
- East wind
- North wind
- West wind
- Southerly
- Sirocco
