= West wind =

Mass movements of air heading east

A west wind is a wind that originates in the west and blows in an eastward direction.

== Mythology and literature ==
In European tradition, it has usually been considered the mildest and most favorable of the directional winds.

In ancient Greek mythology and religion, the god Zephyrus was the personification of the west wind and the bringer of light spring and early summer breezes; his Roman equivalent was Favonius (hence the adjective favonian, pertaining to the west wind).

In Egyptian mythology, Ḥutchai is the god of the west wind. He was depicted as a man with the head of a serpent.

Geoffrey Chaucer wrote of the "swete breth" of Zephyrus, and a soft, gentle breeze may be referred to as a zephyr, as in William Shakespeare's Cymbeline (IV, ii): "They are as gentle / As zephyrs blowing below the violet, / Not wagging his sweet head."

In Iroquois tradition, the "west wind" is brought by the Panther, ugly and fierce.

In Italian history, Ponente is the west wind and the personification of spring and early summer; his winds are usually calm and tepid and very gentle. His ancient Roman equivalent is Favonius.

West winds are inhabited by spirits or Jīvas called vāyukāya ekendriya according to Jainism.

== See also ==
- East wind
- Fremantle Doctor
- North wind
- South wind
- Westerlies
- Eros and Psyche
