= East wind =

Wind that originates in the east and blows west

An east wind is a wind that originates in the east and blows in a westward direction. This wind is referenced as symbolism in culture, mythology, poetry, and literature.

== In culture and mythology ==
In Islam, the east wind Saba holds religious significance as it is said to have assisted Prophet Muhammad in the Battle of the Trench, and makes frequent appearances in the Quran.

In Chinese culture, east wind (東風; Dōngfēng) is often used as a metaphor for the driving force or momentum of revolution and progress. The People's Liberation Army thus uses "east wind" (Dongfeng) as the name of its tactical missile series.

In Greek mythology, Eurus, the east wind, was the only wind not associated with one of the three Greek seasons. Eurus is also the only one of these four Anemoi not mentioned in Hesiod's Theogony or in the Orphic Hymns.

In Egyptian mythology, Henkhisesui is the god of the east wind. He was depicted as a man with the head of a ram.

In Roman mythology the east wind was represented by Vulturnus.

In Native American Iroquois culture, the east wind is said to be brought by O-yan-do-ne, the Moose spirit, whose breath blows grey mist and sends down cold rains upon the earth.

The Authorized King James Version of the English Old Testament makes some seventeen references to the east wind. In Chapter 41 of Genesis, the Pharaoh's dream, which is interpreted by Joseph, describes seven years of grain blasted by the east wind. In Chapters 10 and 14 of Exodus, Moses summons the east wind to bring the locusts that plague Egypt and to part the Red Sea so that the Children of Israel can escape Pharaoh's armies. Several other references exist, most associating the east wind with destruction. Often, this is destruction of the wicked by God.

== See also ==
- Flakpanzer IV "Ostwind" ("East Wind"), a German anti-aircraft vehicle from the Second World War
- North wind
- Polar easterlies
- South wind
- West wind
- Dongfeng (disambiguation)
