= North wind =

Wind coming from the north

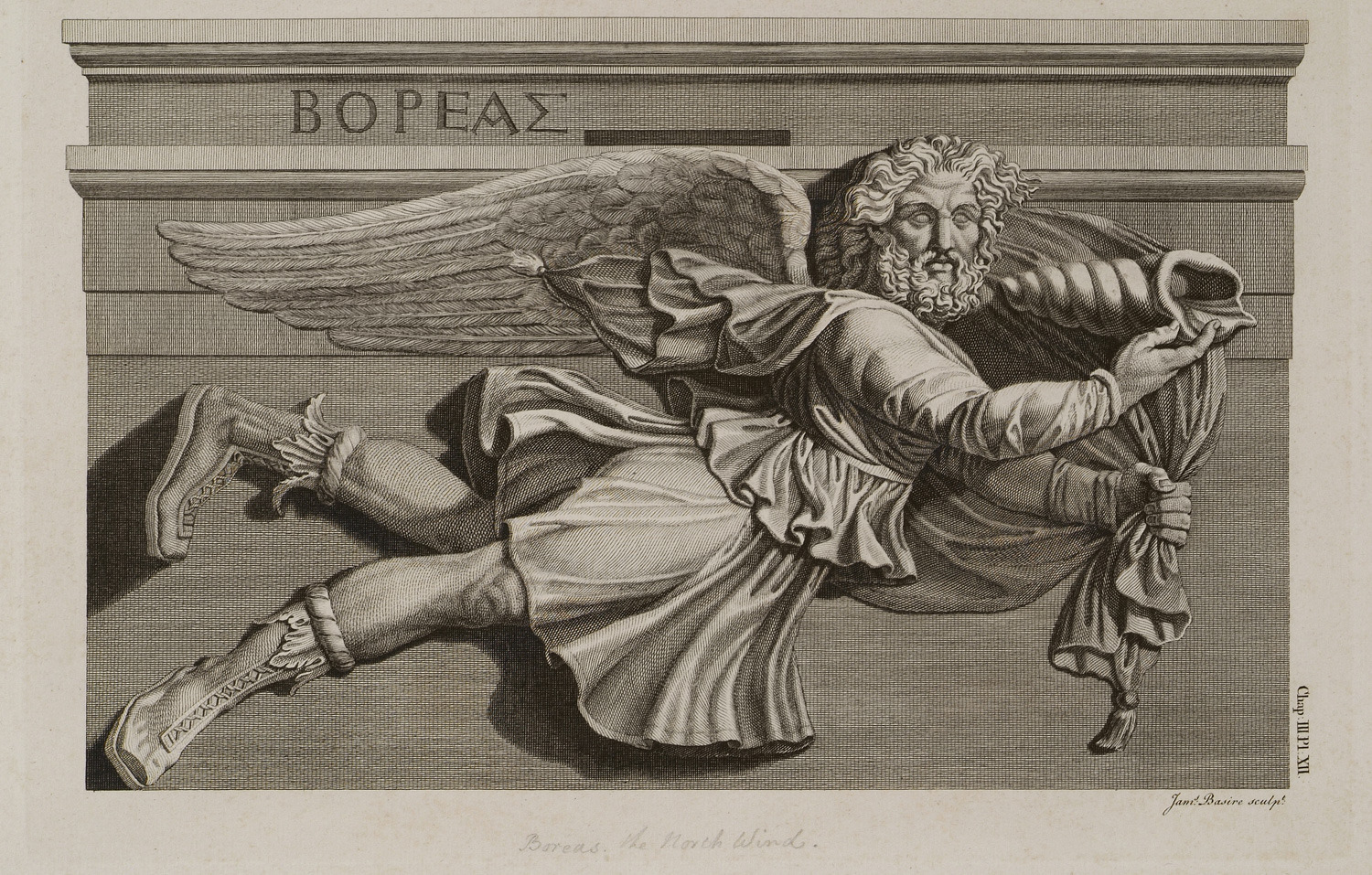
The personification of the north wind as it appears on the Athenian Tower of the Winds (50 BCE)

A north or northerly wind is one that rises in the north and blows southwards, bringing with it wintery weather. The wind has had historical and literary significance in many cultures, since it often signals seasonal change. Over the centuries it has figured in myth, art, folksong and nursery rhyme.

== Mythology ==
In Greece the cold north wind was called Boreas (Βορέας), a term that has given the English language the adjective boreal. A fragment thought to derive from Strabo refers to the effect of this wind: "The black North (melamboreas), a blast violent and chilling, descends in a tempest." Several myths were eventually associated with the wind's divine personification, and others with its equivalent in other cultures, for example Aquilon in Roman mythology; Qebui in Egyptian mythology; and the Inuit Negafook, whose name means "the spirit that likes cold and stormy weather".

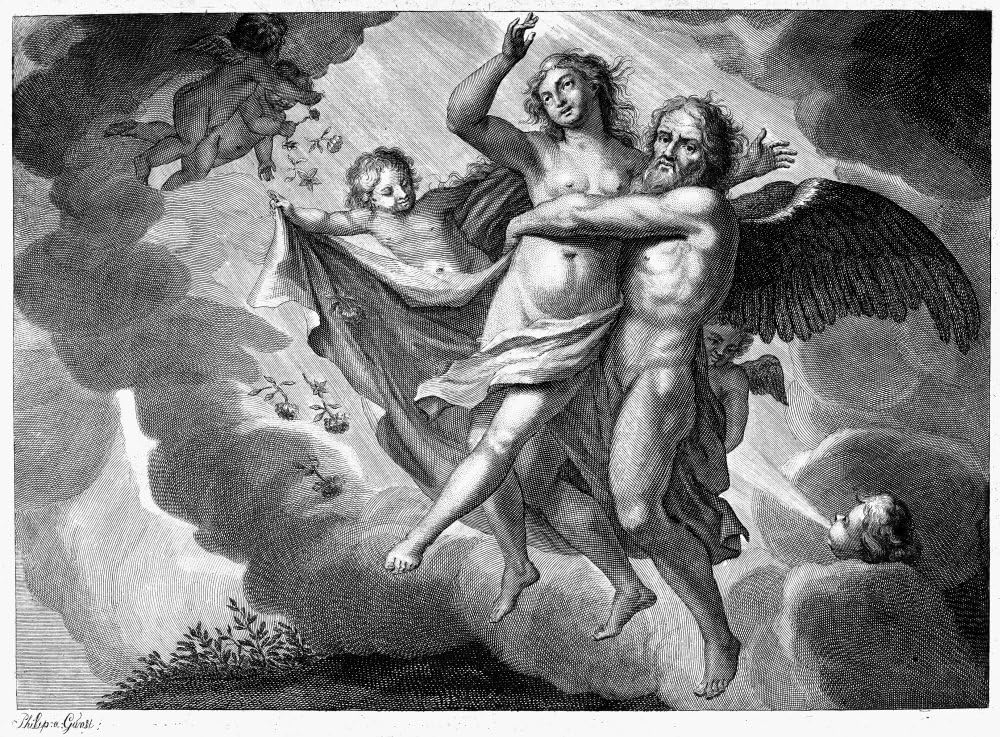
An 18th century copper engraving of the abduction of Orithyia by Boreas, an allegory of spring foliage blighted by northerly winds

The violence of the northerly wind is the quality generally stressed in the stories in which its personification figures, although the god is not always triumphant. In the tale of The North Wind and the Sun, which was eventually ascribed to Aesop's Fables, the sun and the wind contest who will be the first to make a traveller remove his cloak. No matter how hard the wind blows, the traveller wraps the cloak tighter about himself; only when the sun shines does he take it off to cool himself.

Another myth concerns the abduction of Orithyia (daughter of Erechtheus) by the god, which later became a favourite subject for painters. Some of their works emphasise particularly the climatic connection of the god of the north wind. Peter Paul Rubens does so by depicting the cherubs surrounding his bearded figure as engaged in snowball fights. François Boucher's 1769 painting of the subject underlines the climatic disconnection of the two characters by showing the rose-garden on the left from which Orithyia is snatched and, on the right, the havoc of uprooted trees as the work of her abductor.

Other paintings in which females appear concentrate on the seasonal effect of the wind without resorting to mythical tales. Boreas (1903) by John William Waterhouse depicts a girl wearing storm-coloured drapery and buffeted by the wind as she walks over the heath. Evelyn De Morgan's Boreas and the fallen leaves (1910) shows the god gripping and stripping tree branches and whirling about the russet-haired female spirits of the leaves.

== Popular lore ==
A nursery rhyme concerning the wintery conditions associated with the wind is first recorded in Britain by Iona and Peter Opie in a collection from the start of the 19th century:

The north wind doth blow,
And we shall have snow,
And what will poor robin do then?
Poor thing!
He’ll sit in the barn
And keep himself warm,
And keep his head under his wing.
Poor thing!

The same rhyme is later recorded in the US in 1833, and a rhyming Latin translation is quoted in an 1839 anthology.

Stridet ventus Borealis,
Imber ingruet nivalis;
Quo se vertet hora in illa
Rubicilla?
In granario sedebit,
Plumea fovens sedebit
Molle caput sub axilla
Rubicilla.

Another rhyme beginning "Cold and raw the north wind doth blow", a quatrain located in an American edition of Songs for the Nursery, was recorded as a folk song dating from 1817. And in the 1840s, the lines "The north wind doth blow and we shall have snow" are quoted as a British weather proverb. By the same period, the single stanza of the original nursery rhyme had been augmented by four extra stanzas featuring the swallow, the honey bee, the dormouse and children. This version is titled "Winter Song" and is accompanied by a traditional tune.

== See also ==
- West wind
- East wind
- South wind
