= Un Encuentro =

Compilation album by Breed 77
- Released: 7 May 2007
- Genre: Alternative metal, flamenco music
- Length: 46:40
- Label: Albert Productions

Breed 77 chronology
In My Blood (En Mi Sangre) (2006)	Un Encuentro (2007)	Insects (2009)

Professional ratings
Review scores
Source	Rating
Rock Midgets	5/5 stars
Kerrang!	4/5 stars
Rocklouder	4/5 stars
Metal Hammer	7/10 stars

Un Encuentro is an album by Gibraltarian Flamenco metal quintet Breed 77. It was released exclusively as a digital download on iTunes through J. Albert Productions in early 2007, to coincide with the launch of "iTunes Latino". It features 11 songs, all from previous albums, but all sung in Spanish.

"Un Encuentro" was released as a physical CD album on 2007-05-07.

== Track listing ==
- Including title of the original song and the album on which it first appeared.
1. "Petróleo" (In My Blood (En Mi Sangre)) – 3:56
2. "El Mundo en Llamas" ("World's on Fire" - Cultura) – 3:51
3. "Quiero Vivir" ("Alive" - In My Blood (En Mi Sangre)) – 3:50
4. "El Rio" ("The River" - Cultura) - 5:15
5. "Sombras" ("Shadows" - Breed 77) – 3:10
6. "Rompiendo el Silencio" ("Breaking the Silence" - Breed 77) – 5:14
7. "Oración Final" (Cultura) – 6:07
8. "Viento de Levante" (In My Blood (En Mi Sangre)) – 0:51
9. "La Última Hora" (Cultura) – 4:03
10. "Ya Lo Ves" ("So You Know" - In My Blood (En Mi Sangre)) – 4:49
11. "Diluvio" ("Floods" - Breed 77) – 5:54
- These songs had their Spanish title in the original song:
  - 'Petróleo' translates as 'Petroleum'
  - 'Oración Final' translates as 'Final Prayer' (as found on their debut album)
  - 'Viento de Levante' translates as 'Easterly Wind'
  - 'La Última Hora' translates as 'The Final Hour'
