= ITunes Store =

Digital media store

iTunes Store

- The iTunes Store, as seen in iTunes 12.12.7.1, running on Windows 10 from January 31, 2023
- Developer: Apple
- Type: Digital music store Video on demand (moved to Apple TV); App store (moved to App Store); Ebook store (moved to Apple Books); Podcast store (moved to Apple Podcasts)
- Launched: April 28, 2003; 23 years ago (macOS); October 16, 2003; 23 years ago (Microsoft Windows); June 29, 2007; 19 years ago (iOS)
- Platforms: macOS iOS iPadOS tvOS; Windows XP and later
- Availability: See Internationalization
- Website: apple.com/itunes

iTunes Store is a digital marketplace selling songs, albums, music videos, ringtones and alert tones. It was launched by Apple on April 28, 2003, for Mac OS X, and on October 16, 2003, for Microsoft Windows. It launched as a mobile application with iOS on June 29, 2007.

It previously sold mobile applications until the launch of the App Store on July 10, 2008, and e-books until the launch of the iBooks Store on March 31, 2010. It also used to facilitate the downloading of podcasts which later became integrated into Apple Podcasts, as well as the provision to buy and rent films and TV shows which has since become integrated into Apple TV.

The iTunes Store opened as part of then-CEO Steve Jobs' push to open a digital marketplace for music. When it launched, it was the only legal digital catalog of music to offer songs from all five major record labels, which played a part in its success and influenced the music downloading business. Music streaming services began to overtake music downloading, with Apple launching Apple Music on June 30, 2015.

== History ==
Steve Jobs saw the opportunity to open a digital marketplace for music due to the rising popularity of easily downloadable tracks. In 2002, Jobs made an agreement with the five major record labels to offer their content through iTunes. The iTunes Music Store (later iTunes Store) was introduced by Jobs at a special Apple music event in April 2003. Music could be purchased in the iTunes application, and purchases were playable in iTunes or on the iPod. The store was initially available to Mac computers, and was later expanded to Microsoft Windows in October 2003 when iTunes for Windows was launched.

In April 2008, the iTunes Store was the largest music vendor in the United States, and in February 2010, it was the largest music vendor in the world. The iTunes Store's revenues in the first quarter of 2011 totaled nearly US$1.4 billion. By May 28, 2014, the store had sold 35 billion songs worldwide.

In 2016, it was reported that music streaming services had overtaken digital downloads in sales. It was reported that iTunes-style digital download sales had dropped 24% as streaming continued to increase.

In April 2018, the iTunes app was added to the Microsoft Windows 10 app store. Beginning in the spring of 2019, the iTunes app became available on Samsung Smart TVs.

In October 2019, with the release of macOS Catalina, iTunes was split into separate Music, TV, and Podcasts apps. Apple's storefront for movies and television shows moved inside the TV app. Any music in users' iTunes library would transfer to the Music app, which would still offer access to the iTunes Store.

== Features and restrictions ==
=== Current availability ===
The iTunes Store is available on most Apple devices, including the Mac (inside the Music app), the iPhone, the iPad, the iPod touch, and the Apple TV, as well as on Windows (inside iTunes). Video purchases from the iTunes Store are viewable on the Apple TV app on Roku and Amazon Fire TV devices and certain smart televisions. Unlike other Apple media services such as Apple Music or Apple TV+, there is no web-based interface for the iTunes Store with the exception of limited iTunes Preview pages; the desktop application has to be installed to browse the store. While initially a dominant player in digital media, by the mid-2010s, streaming media services were generating more revenue than the buy-to-own model used by the iTunes Store.

Currently, iTunes is supported on the macOS (Leopard and above) and Microsoft Windows operating systems. iTunes was known to run passably well in Linux on x86-based computers using the Wine compatibility layer; however, by December 2011, this was no longer the case. Users without iTunes installed can see a content database (but not hear or view the content itself) using the iTunes Preview service, which runs inside a web browser. This service also allows users to watch trailers for upcoming film releases. Should they choose to purchase any media, they will be redirected to iTunes.

=== Pricing model ===
==== History ====
Following the introduction of the iTunes Store, individual songs were all sold for the same price, though Apple introduced multiple prices in 2007. Music in the store is in the Advanced Audio Coding (AAC) format, which is the MPEG-4-specified successor to MP3. Originally, songs were only available with DRM and were encoded at 128 kbit/s. At the January 2009 Macworld Expo, Apple announced that all iTunes music would be made available without DRM, and encoded at the higher-quality rate of 256 kbit/s. Previously, this model, known as "iTunes Plus", had been available only for music from EMI and some independent labels. Users can sample songs by listening to previews, ninety seconds in length, or thirty seconds for short tracks.

In addition, the iTunes Store offers apps, which are applications used for various purposes (games, productivity, news, etc.) that are compatible with the iPod Touch, iPhone, and iPad, although some apps are specifically for the iPhone or iPad only. Some apps cost money (called "Paid Apps") and some are free (called "Free Apps"). Developers can decide which prices they want to charge for apps, from a pre-set list of pricing tiers, from free to several hundred dollars. When someone downloads an App, 70 percent of the purchase goes to the developer(s), and 30 percent goes to Apple.

At the Macworld 2008 keynote, Steve Jobs, who was Apple's CEO at the time, announced iTunes movie rentals. Movies are available for rent in the iTunes Store on the same day they are released on DVD, though the iTunes Store also offers for rental some movies that are still in theaters. Movie rentals are only viewable for 24 hours (in the US) or 48 hours (in other countries) after users begin viewing them. The iTunes Store also offers one low-priced movie rental a week: in the United States, this rental costs 99 cents. Movie rentals are still not available in all countries but they are available in many countries including the United States, Mexico, the United Kingdom, Canada, Australia, India and New Zealand. There is a weekly promotion in which one to three songs are available to download for free to logged-in users. Free downloads are available on Tuesdays, and remain free until the following Tuesday, when the store gets refreshed with new content. Some artists choose to have select songs available for no charge. This is not available at all iTunes Stores. Some iTunes television programs have begun the same technique to encourage brand loyalty, although those stay longer. In fact, the iTunes Store has a "Free TV Episodes" page where free episodes are organized by length, either as "featurettes" (shorter than 15 minutes) or full-length episodes (longer than 15 minutes). Free content can vary from a preview of a show to bonus content to pilot episodes and entire seasons of TV shows (examples of free seasons include HBO's The Weight of the Nation and ABC's Pan-Am). Some networks, such as ABC and NBC, have their own pages of "Free Season Premieres".

While previously the US iTunes Store has offered as many as three free songs each week (the single of the week, Discovery Download, and Canción de la Semana) in recent years, the store has instead replaced the three aforementioned categories with a unified "Single of the Week" banner, with the week's single being from a new up-and-coming artist. In 2015, Apple discontinued the "Single of the Week" program.

==== Current model ====
===== Music =====
- A song usually costs 99¢; however, for songs with high popularity, the price is usually raised to $1.29. By default, songs that are more than 10 minutes are considered "Album Only"; distributors also have the power to make a song "Album Only." For special offers, song prices can be dropped to 69¢ or free.
- By default, music albums cost $9.99 or the price of all the songs combined if it is less than $9.99. However, the music album's distributor can set a higher price for the album (as long as it is some amount of dollars and 99 cents), which usually happens on popular music albums. For special offers, prices of music albums can be dropped to $4.99, $5.99, $6.99, or $7.99.
- On June 30, 2015, Apple launched Apple Music as a subscription service, initially available in 110 countries. New subscribers are offered a three-month free trial with ongoing subscriptions priced from $10.99/month in the US and £10.99 in the UK or €10,99 for countries in the Eurozone.

===== TV shows =====
- By default, HD television episodes cost $2.99, while standard definition television episodes cost $1.99. However, distributors can make a television episode "Season Only."
- A television season costs either an amount of dollars (determined by number of episodes and definition) and 99 cents with the number in the one's place being a 4, 7, or 9, or the price of all episodes combined.

===== Movies =====
- Unpopular movies cost $7.99 to buy in standard definition and $13.00 or 14.99 to buy in HD. Popular movies or new releases cost $13.00 or 14.99 to buy in standard definition and $17.99 or 19.99 to buy in HD.
- Unpopular movies cost $2.99 to rent in standard definition and $3.99 to rent in HD. Popular movies cost $3.99 to rent in standard definition and $4.99 to rent in HD. For recent releases, this price is increased by $1.
- Movies that are available in 4K and HDR (either HDR10 or Dolby Vision with an HDR10 profile) cost the same price as HD, and are automatically upgraded from HD to 4K and HDR at no additional cost. Movies can be played back in 4K and HDR on an Apple TV 4K or a Mac released in 2018 or later running macOS Catalina when hooked up to a compatible display, and can be played back in HDR on an iPhone 8/X or later, a 10.5" or 11" iPad Pro, and a 2nd gen or later 12.9" iPad Pro running iOS 11 or later, or a MacBook released in 2018 or later running macOS Catalina or later.
- Movies that are available with a Dolby Atmos audio track requires an Apple TV 4K running tvOS 12 or later hooked up to a Dolby Atmos soundbar or receiver, a MacBook released in 2018 or later running macOS Catalina, an iPhone XS/XR running iOS 13 or later, or an 11"/3-gen 12.9" iPad Pro running iPadOS or later.

===== Apps =====
App prices are set by the developer; they can be free of charge or charged at 99 cents plus any number of dollars.

=== iTunes Store for iOS ===
The iTunes Store allows users to purchase and download items directly to portable Apple devices, such as the iPhone, iPad, Apple TV and iPod Touch. Apple offers three apps, each of which provides access to certain types of content.

- The App Store app sells apps for iOS, and also provides updates to these apps.
- The iTunes Store app sells music and videos.
- The Apple Books app sells ebooks.

Other, free content available from the iTunes Store can be accessed from two other iOS apps:

- The Podcasts apps lets users download, subscribe to and sync podcasts.
- The iTunes U app gives access to iTunes U educational material.

Originally, mobile users had to be connected to a Wi-Fi network in order to enter the store, hence its original name: iTunes Wi-Fi Music Store. However, at Macworld 2009, Apple issued a software update which automatically allowed 3G and EDGE users to access the store's full functionality for files smaller than 10 megabytes (MB). The iOS 3.0 update added the ability to download movies, TV shows, audiobooks, iTunes U, and ringtones on mobile devices, in addition to the previously available songs and podcasts. On February 18, 2010, Apple increased the 10 MB 3G download limit to 20 MB. In March 2012, Apple increased the 3G download limit to 50 MB, and, in late 2013, Apple increased the limit to 100 MB when they released the final version of iOS 7 for their new iPhones.

=== Customer support ===
In the United States, Apple provides technical support for the iTunes Store via email; there is no phone number for issues with iTunes purchases. Most customer service inquiries are handled online, via the Report a Problem link in iTunes.

=== Charitable donations ===
In response to major natural disasters, Apple provides the facility for donations to be made through the iTunes Store. Unlike other iTunes purchases, donations made to charitable organizations through this system are not subject to the 30% handling fee Apple usually charges. iTunes donation pages were set up following the 2010 Haiti earthquake, the 2011 Japanese earthquake and tsunami, and Hurricane Sandy in 2012. In all of these cases, donations were redirected to the Red Cross.

=== Music ===
The store began operations after Apple signed deals with five major record companies: EMI, Universal Music Group, Warner Music Group, Sony Music Entertainment, and Bertelsmann Music Group. Songs from more than 2,000 independent labels were added later, the first being from The Orchard on June 24, 2003.

As of April 2020, iTunes offers 60 million songs, including exclusive tracks from numerous artists. Not all artists are available on iTunes, but many holdouts, such as Led Zeppelin and Radiohead, have allowed their music to be sold on the iTunes Store in recent years. The iTunes Store is updated each Tuesday.

Downloaded songs come with song information (name, artist, album) already filled out, though iTunes provides a free service by Gracenote to do this for songs not purchased from the store, although they must be imported with iTunes. Songs that have an entry in the iTunes Store also come with album artwork (Artwork is embedded in the metadata). Artwork can be obtained for songs not purchased from the store for free if the user has an iTunes Store account. Purchased songs do not come with lyrics, nor does iTunes provide a service for acquiring the missing lyrics.

Some albums purchased on iTunes come with booklets. The first instance of this was the release of the album How to Dismantle an Atomic Bomb by rock band U2.

==== "Album Only" songs ====
Some songs are available from the store by "Album Only", meaning the song can only be acquired through the purchase of the entire album, whereas most songs can be downloaded separately from the album they belong to.

Songs above 10 minutes in length are by default Album Only songs. However, this is not universally true; for example, Living in the Heart of the Beast by Henry Cow is 16 minutes and 18 seconds, yet is available for individual purchase as of 24 December 2013. Soundtracks also often have many Album Only tracks.

Movie soundtracks normally include songs owned by many different labels, making licensing more complex. For example, Forrest Gump: The Soundtrack includes songs from Peacock Records, Argo Records, and Capitol Records, among many others. Greatest Hits by Red Hot Chili Peppers has only one song, "Higher Ground", that is not available for download on a per song basis, whilst Circus (Britney Spears' 2008 album) has two songs that are available for album download only, Rock Me In and Phonography.

==== Partial Albums ====
Some albums on the iTunes store are available only as a "Partial Album" meaning that one or more of the songs on an album's CD release are not available on its iTunes equivalent, often due to differing copyright holders between songs.

==== "Work Only" songs ====
Some tracks are listed as "Work Only", which means they can only be obtained by purchasing the entire piece of work (within the album); the tracks cannot be bought as singles. Works are generally pieces of classical music: symphonies, string quartets, etc., in multiple movements.

==== "LP" format ====
In September 2009, Apple introduced the iTunes LP format (known pre-launch by the code name "Cocktail") which features visual, interactive content alongside album tracks and lyrics.

==== Store sections ====
When entering the US music store, there are multiple sections one can visit. Music is divided into genres (Alternative, Classical, Jazz, Soundtrack, etc.), and there are a number of links to other sections of the store under the Quick Links header. These include Recommended for You, Complete My Album, iTunes LP, as well as thematic sections, such as iTunes Festival sections.

In November 2006, Apple created a category for Latino and Hispanic content, "iTunes Latino". Telemundo and Mun2 made some of their popular programs available for purchase, becoming the first Hispanic television content in the store. It offers music, music videos, audiobooks, podcasts and television shows in Spanish in a single concentrated area. The brief descriptions given to the content are in Spanish as well as several subcategories. Gibraltarian flamenco metal band Breed 77 released an exclusive album called Un Encuentro to coincide with the launch of "iTunes Latino". It features 11 songs, all from previous albums, but all sung in Spanish.

In 2012, Apple created Mastered for iTunes. When iTunes launched, the decision was made to standardize on AAC instead of the more popular MP3 format on the supposition that it offers better quality compared to other codecs at similar bit rates. Mastered for iTunes (MFiT) is a procedure developed by Apple specifically for mastering engineers to follow. This set of tools allows engineers to audition Apple's proprietary encoding during the mastering process to take into account how music will eventually interact with Apple's encoding. In addition to auditioning the encoder, there is also a tool (called afclip) that processes the audio file and creates a text file for audio clips. Because of this special encoding process, extra attention must be paid to headroom and inter-sample peaking while mastering. In August 2019, it was announced that the Mastered for iTunes program would be rebranded as Apple Digital Masters. With the rebranding, the high resolution masters are now available with Apple Music through streaming. It is speculated that the rebranding came because the functionality of iTunes would be changing in macOS Catalina and therefore the Mastered for iTunes name no longer made sense.

== Censorship ==
There is a policy of censoring profanity in titles on iTunes. This has resulted in a Scunthorpe glitch, by which inoffensive titles are censored due to a coincidental string of letters. If the song has an explicit label, it will be marked "explicit" next to the song title. If a song is marked "explicit" it is unavailable for purchase if "restrict explicit content" is checked under the parental controls preference. Often there will be a "clean" mark next to the title of some songs, meaning the lyrics have been censored, and is available to purchase on all accounts. Generally if a song is marked "clean" there is an explicit version available as well.

== Reception and commercial success ==
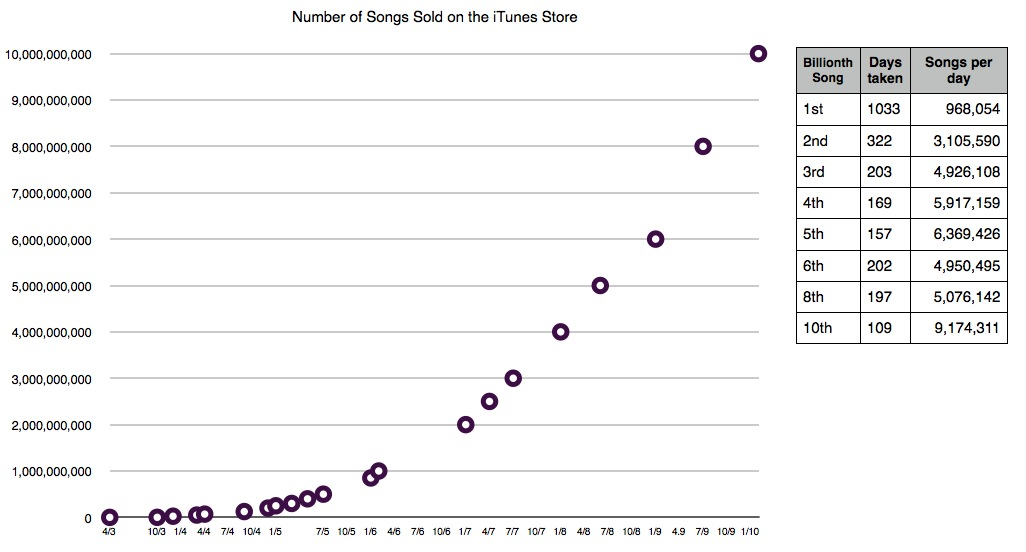
Sales of iTunes songs, 2003–2010

In the first 18 hours, the iTunes store sold about 275,000 tracks, and more than 1 million tracks were sold in its first 5 days. When it was released on Windows in October 2003, the iTunes program was downloaded more than 1 million times in the first 3 days, selling more than 1 million songs in that period. On December 15, 2003, Apple announced that it had sold 25 million songs.

In January 2004 at the Macworld Conference & Expo in San Francisco, Steve Jobs announced (Sellers, 2004) that an unnamed person had purchased US$29,500 worth of music. On March 15, 2004, Apple announced that iTunes Music Store customers had purchased and downloaded 50 million songs from iTunes Music Store. They also reported that customers were purchasing 2.5 million songs a week which translates to a projected annual run rate of 130 million songs a year. The 50 millionth song was "The Path of Thorns" by Sarah McLachlan.

On April 28, 2004, iTunes Music Store marked its first anniversary with 70 million songs sold, clear dominance in the paid online music market and a slight profit. The store also offers hundreds of movie trailers and music videos, in an attempt to boost soundtrack sales. In the conference, Steve Jobs reiterated that a subscription service is still not in the interest of customers and reported that only 5 million of the 100 million songs offered in the Pepsi giveaway campaign were redeemed, which he blamed on technical problems in Pepsi distribution. According to an Apple press release dated August 10, 2004, iTunes Music Store was the first store to have a catalog of more than one million songs. Also, iTunes Music Store at that point maintained a 70 percent market share of legal music downloads.

The emerging monopoly of the store was criticized in 2011 by Mike Lang of Miramax for "effectively strangling the industry". He says that because the music industry has allowed too few content providers, it is now suffering. Lang views the issue as being more of a threat than music piracy.

== Sales milestones ==
=== Music ===
- 100 million songs sold: July 11, 2004

(Kevin Britten of Hays, Kansas, bought the 100 millionth song, and the twenty-year-old received a call from Steve Jobs congratulating him.)

- 125 million songs sold: September 1, 2004
- 150 million songs sold: October 14, 2004
- 200 million songs sold: December 16, 2004

(Ryan Alekman of Belchertown, Massachusetts, bought the 200 millionth song, which was one of the tracks on U2's digital box set The Complete U2.)

- 250 million songs sold: January 24, 2005
- 300 million songs sold: March 2, 2005
- 400 million songs sold: May 10, 2005

On July 5, 2005, Apple announced a promotion counting down to half a billion songs sold.

- 500 million songs sold: July 18, 2005

(Amy Greer of Lafayette, Indiana, bought the 500 millionth song, "Mississippi Girl" by Faith Hill.)

- 850 million songs sold: January 10, 2006
- 1 billion songs sold: February 23, 2006

(Alex Ostrovsky of West Bloomfield, Michigan, bought the billionth song, "Speed of Sound" by Coldplay. He later got a call from Steve Jobs with the news that the sixteen-year-old was getting ten iPods, an iMac, a $10,000 music gift certificate, and a scholarship established in his name at the Juilliard School.)

- 1.5 billion songs sold: September 12, 2006
- 2 billion songs sold: January 9, 2007
- 2.5 billion songs sold: April 9, 2007
- 3 billion songs sold: July 31, 2007
- 4 billion songs sold: January 15, 2008
- 5 billion songs sold: June 19, 2008
- 6 billion songs sold: January 6, 2009
- 8 billion songs sold: July 21, 2009
- 8.6 billion songs sold: September 9, 2009
- 10 billion songs sold: February 24, 2010

(Louie Sulcer of Woodstock, Georgia, downloaded "Guess Things Happen That Way" by Johnny Cash. At 71 years old, he was the oldest milestone winner to that date. He received a call from Steve Jobs and a $10,000 iTunes gift card.)

- 15 billion songs sold: June 6, 2011
- 20 billion songs sold: September 12, 2012
- 25 billion songs sold: February 6, 2013
- 35 billion songs sold: May 28, 2014

=== Video ===
- 1 million videos sold: October 31, 2005
- 3+ million videos sold: December 6, 2005
- 8 million videos sold: January 10, 2006
- 15 million videos sold: February 23, 2006
- 45 million videos sold: September 12, 2006
- 50 million television episodes sold: January 10, 2007
- 1.3 million feature-length films sold: January 10, 2007
- 2 million films sold: April 11, 2007
- 200 million television episodes sold: October 16, 2008
- 1+ million HD episodes sold: October 16, 2008

=== Applications ===
- 10 million apps downloaded: July 14, 2008
- 100 million apps downloaded: September 9, 2008
- 200 million apps downloaded: October 22, 2008
- 300 million apps downloaded: December 5, 2008
- 500 million apps downloaded: January 16, 2009
- 800 million apps downloaded: March 17, 2009
- 1 billion apps downloaded: April 23, 2009
- 1.5 billion apps downloaded: July 14, 2009
- 1.8 billion apps downloaded: September 9, 2009
- 2 billion apps downloaded: September 28, 2009
- 3 billion apps downloaded: January 5, 2010
- 7 billion apps downloaded: October 20, 2010
- 10 billion apps downloaded: January 22, 2011
- 15 billion apps downloaded: July 7, 2011
- 25 billion apps downloaded: March 5, 2012
- 30 billion apps downloaded: June 11, 2012
- 35 billion apps downloaded: October 23, 2012
- 40 billion apps downloaded: January 7, 2013
- 50 billion apps downloaded: May 16, 2013
- 60 billion apps downloaded: October 22, 2013
- 75 billion apps downloaded: June 2, 2014
- 100 billion apps downloaded: June 8, 2015
- 250 billion apps downloaded: December 2016

=== Market share ===
- On September 12, 2006, Steve Jobs announced in his "It's Showtime" keynote that Apple had 88% of the legal US music download market.
- On April 11, 2007, Apple announced that the iTunes Store had sold more than two million movies, making it the world's most popular online movie store.
- On February 26, 2008, the iTunes Store surpassed Best Buy to become the second-largest music vendor in the US behind Walmart, and became number one on April 3, 2008.
- On October 10, 2012, the iTunes Store was reported to have a 64% share of the online music market, and a 29% share of all music sales worldwide.

== Internationalization ==
Originally only Mac OS X users who had a US billing address could buy songs with the service, but Steve Jobs announced plans to support both Windows and non-American users. The Windows version of iTunes and support for the Windows platform from iTunes Music Store were announced on October 16, 2003, with immediate availability. Beginning in 2004, the service became available in a number of countries other than the United States:

Country	Product type										Affiliate program	Price/song
Country	Music	Music Videos	Podcasts	TV shows	Movies	Apps	Books	iTunes Match	iTunes U	iTunes Radio	Affiliate program	Price/song
United States	April 28, 2003	Yes	Yes	October 12, 2005	Yes	Yes	Yes	Yes	Yes	Discontinued January 28, 2016	Yes	US$0.69–1.29
France	June 15, 2004	Yes	Yes	Yes	April 30, 2009	Yes	Yes	December 15, 2011	Yes	No	Yes	€0.69–1.29 ($0.92–1.72)
Germany	June 15, 2004	Yes	Yes	April 2, 2008	April 16, 2009	Yes	Yes	December 15, 2011	Yes	No	Yes	€0.69–1.29 ($0.92–1.72)
United Kingdom	June 15, 2004	Yes	Yes	Yes	June 4, 2008	Yes	Yes	December 15, 2011	Yes	No	Yes	£0.59–0.99 ($0.91–1.53)
Austria	October 26, 2004	Yes	Yes	No	Yes	Yes	Yes	April 30, 2012	Yes	No	Yes	€0.69–1.29 ($0.92–1.72)
Belgium	October 26, 2004	Yes	Yes	No	Yes	Yes	Yes	December 15, 2011	Yes	No	Yes	€0.69–1.29 ($0.92–1.72)
Finland	October 26, 2004	Yes	Yes	No	Yes	Yes	Yes	December 9, 2013	Yes	No	Yes	€0.69–1.29 ($0.92–1.72)
Greece	October 26, 2004	Yes	Yes	No	Yes	Yes	Yes	April 30, 2012	Yes	No	Yes	€0.69–1.29 ($0.92–1.72)
Italy	October 26, 2004	Yes	Yes	No	Yes	Yes	Yes	April 30, 2012	Yes	No	Yes	€0.69–1.29 ($0.92–1.72)
Luxembourg	October 26, 2004	Yes	Yes	No	Yes	Yes	Yes	December 15, 2011	Yes	No	Yes	€0.69–1.29 ($0.92–1.72)
Netherlands	October 26, 2004	Yes	Yes	No	September 27, 2011	Yes	Yes	January 16, 2012	Yes	No	Yes	€0.69–1.29 ($0.92–1.72)
Portugal	October 26, 2004	Yes	Yes	No	Yes	Yes	Yes	April 30, 2012	Yes	No	Yes	€0.69–1.29 ($0.92–1.72)
Spain	October 26, 2004	Yes	Yes	No	Yes	Yes	Yes	December 15, 2011	Yes	No	Yes	€0.69–1.29 ($0.92–1.72)
Canada	December 2, 2004	Yes	Yes	Yes	June 4, 2008	Yes	Yes	December 15, 2011	Yes	No	Yes	0.69 – 1.29 CAD ($0.67–1.25)
Ireland	January 6, 2005	Yes	Yes	No	April 30, 2009	Yes	Yes	December 15, 2011	Yes	No	Yes	€0.69–1.29 ($0.92–1.72)
Sweden	May 10, 2005	Yes	Yes	No	Yes	Yes	Yes	December 9, 2013	Yes	No	Yes	9 – 12 SEK ($1.25–1.67)
Norway	May 10, 2005	Yes	Yes	No	Yes	Yes	Yes	December 9, 2013	Yes	No	Yes	8 – 10 NOK ($1.32–1.66)
Switzerland	May 10, 2005	Yes	Yes	No	Yes	Yes	Yes	December 15, 2011	Yes	No	Yes	1.60 – 2.20 CHF ($1.53–2.11)
Denmark	May 10, 2005	Yes	Yes	No	Yes	Yes	Yes	December 9, 2013	Yes	No	Yes	8 – 10 DKK ($1.52–1.90)
Japan	August 4, 2005	Yes	Yes	No	Yes	Yes	March 6, 2013	May 2, 2014	Yes	No	Yes	150 – 250 JPY ($1.81–3.02)
Australia	October 25, 2005	October 25, 2005	Yes	June 24, 2008	August 14, 2008	Yes	Yes	December 15, 2011	Yes	Discontinued January 28, 2016	Yes	1.19 – 2.19 AUD ($1.28–2.35)
New Zealand	December 6, 2005	Yes	Yes	No	August 14, 2008	Yes	October 22, 2012	December 15, 2011	Yes	No	Yes	1.79 – 2.39 NZD ($1.47–1.96)
Mexico	August 4, 2009	Yes	Yes	No	November 9, 2010	Yes	October 22, 2012	December 15, 2011	Yes	No	Yes	9 – 15 MXN ($0.71–1.19)
Bulgaria	September 29, 2011	Yes	Yes	No	Yes	Yes	Yes	April 30, 2012	Yes	No	Yes	€0.69–1.29 ($0.92–1.72)
Cyprus	September 29, 2011	Yes	Yes	No	Yes	Yes	Yes	December 15, 2011	Yes	No	Yes	€0.69–1.29 ($0.92–1.72)
Czech Republic	September 29, 2011	Yes	Yes	No	Yes	Yes	Yes	December 15, 2011	Yes	No	Yes	€0.69–1.29 ($0.92–1.72)
Estonia	September 29, 2011	Yes	Yes	No	Yes	Yes	Yes	January 16, 2012	Yes	No	Yes	€0.69–1.29 ($0.92–1.72)
Hungary	September 29, 2011	Yes	Yes	No	Yes	Yes	Yes	July 19, 2012	Yes	No	Yes	€0.69–1.29 ($0.92–1.72)
Latvia	September 29, 2011	Yes	Yes	No	Yes	Yes	Yes	January 16, 2012	Yes	No	Yes	€0.69–1.29 ($0.92–1.72)
Lithuania	September 29, 2011	Yes	Yes	No	Yes	Yes	Yes	January 16, 2012	Yes	No	Yes	€0.69–1.29 ($0.92–1.72)
Malta	September 29, 2011	Yes	Yes	No	Yes	Yes	Yes	December 15, 2011	Yes	No	Yes	€0.69–1.29 ($0.92–1.72)
Poland	September 29, 2011	Yes	Yes	No	Yes	Yes	Yes	July 19, 2012	Yes	No	Yes	€0.69–1.29 ($0.92–1.72)
Romania	September 29, 2011	Yes	Yes	No	No	Yes	Yes	Yes	Yes	No	Yes	€0.69–1.29 ($0.92–1.72)
Slovenia	September 29, 2011	Yes	Yes	No	Yes	Yes	Yes	April 30, 2012	Yes	No	Yes	€0.69–1.29 ($0.92–1.72)
Slovakia	September 29, 2011	Yes	Yes	No	Yes	Yes	Yes	Yes	Yes	No	Yes	€0.69–1.29 ($0.92–1.72)
Argentina	December 13, 2011	Yes	Yes	No	December 13, 2011	Yes	October 22, 2012	January 16, 2012	Yes	No	Yes	$0.69–1.29
Brazil	December 13, 2011	Yes	Yes	No	December 13, 2011	Yes	October 22, 2012	December 13, 2011	Yes	No	Yes	1,90 – 2,90 BRL
Bolivia	December 13, 2011	Yes	Yes	No	December 13, 2011	Yes	October 22, 2012	January 16, 2012	Yes	No	Yes	$0.69–1.29
Chile	December 13, 2011	Yes	Yes	No	December 13, 2011	Yes	October 22, 2012	January 16, 2012	Yes	No	Yes	$0.69–1.29
Colombia	December 13, 2011	Yes	Yes	No	December 13, 2011	Yes	October 22, 2012	January 16, 2012	Yes	No	Yes	$0.69–1.29
Costa Rica	December 13, 2011	Yes	Yes	No	December 13, 2011	Yes	October 22, 2012	January 16, 2012	Yes	No	Yes	$0.69–1.29
Dominican Republic	December 13, 2011	Yes	Yes	No	December 13, 2011	Yes	October 22, 2012	January 16, 2012	Yes	No	Yes	$0.69–1.29
Ecuador	December 13, 2011	Yes	Yes	No	December 13, 2011	Yes	October 22, 2012	January 16, 2012	Yes	No	Yes	$0.69–1.29
El Salvador	December 13, 2011	Yes	Yes	No	December 13, 2011	Yes	October 22, 2012	January 16, 2012	Yes	No	Yes	$0.69–1.29
Guatemala	December 13, 2011	Yes	Yes	No	December 13, 2011	Yes	October 22, 2012	January 16, 2012	Yes	No	Yes	$0.69–1.29
Honduras	December 13, 2011	Yes	Yes	No	December 13, 2011	Yes	October 22, 2012	January 16, 2012	Yes	No	Yes	$0.69–1.29
Nicaragua	December 13, 2011	Yes	Yes	No	December 13, 2011	Yes	October 22, 2012	January 16, 2012	Yes	No	Yes	$0.69–1.29
Panama	December 13, 2011	Yes	Yes	No	December 13, 2011	Yes	October 22, 2012	January 16, 2012	Yes	No	Yes	$0.69–1.29
Paraguay	December 13, 2011	Yes	Yes	No	December 13, 2011	Yes	October 22, 2012	January 16, 2012	Yes	No	Yes	$0.69–1.29
Peru	December 13, 2011	Yes	Yes	No	December 13, 2011	Yes	October 22, 2012	January 16, 2012	Yes	No	Yes	$0.69–1.29
Venezuela	December 13, 2011	Yes	Yes	No	December 13, 2011	Yes	October 22, 2012	January 16, 2012	Yes	No	Yes	$0.69–1.29
Brunei	June 27, 2012	Yes	Yes	No	June 27, 2012	Yes	free books	June 27, 2012	Yes	No	Yes	$0.69–1.29
Cambodia	June 27, 2012	Yes	June 21, 2012	No	June 27, 2012	June 21, 2012	free books	June 27, 2012	June 21, 2012	No	Yes	$0.69–1.29
Hong Kong	June 27, 2012	Yes	Yes	No	June 27, 2012	Yes	free books	June 27, 2012	Yes	No	Yes	5 – 8 HKD
Laos	June 27, 2012	Yes	June 21, 2012	No	June 27, 2012	June 21, 2012	free books	June 27, 2012	June 21, 2012	No	Yes	$0.69–1.29
Macao	June 27, 2012	Yes	Yes	No	June 27, 2012	Yes	free books	June 27, 2012	Yes	No	Yes	$0.69–1.29
Malaysia	June 27, 2012	Yes	Yes	No	June 27, 2012	Yes	free books	June 27, 2012	Yes	No	Yes	$0.69–1.29
Philippines	June 27, 2012	Yes	Yes	No	June 27, 2012	Yes	free books	June 27, 2012	Yes	No	Yes	$0.69–1.29
Singapore	June 27, 2012	Yes	Yes	No	June 27, 2012	Yes	free books	June 27, 2012	Yes	No	Yes	0.98 – 1.48 SGD
Sri Lanka	June 27, 2012	Yes	Yes	No	June 27, 2012	Yes	free books	June 27, 2012	Yes	No	Yes	$0.69–1.29
Taiwan	June 27, 2012	Yes	Yes	No	June 27, 2012	Yes	free books	June 27, 2012	Yes	No	Yes	15 – 30 TWD ($0.51–1.02)
Thailand	June 27, 2012	Yes	Yes	No	June 27, 2012	Yes	free books	June 27, 2012	Yes	No	Yes	$0.69–1.29
Vietnam	June 27, 2012	Yes	Yes	No	June 27, 2012	Yes	free books	June 27, 2012	Yes	No	Yes	$0.69–1.29
Anguilla	December 4, 2012	December 4, 2012	Yes	No	December 12, 2012	Yes	free books	Yes	Yes	No	Yes	—N/a
Antigua and Barbuda	December 4, 2012	December 4, 2012	Yes	No	December 12, 2012	Yes	free books	Yes	Yes	No	Yes	—N/a
Armenia	December 4, 2012	December 4, 2012	Yes	No	December 12, 2012	Yes	free books	Yes	Yes	No	Yes	—N/a
Azerbaijan	December 4, 2012	December 4, 2012	Yes	No	December 12, 2012	Yes	free books	Yes	Yes	No	Yes	—N/a
Bahamas	December 4, 2012	December 4, 2012	Yes	No	December 12, 2012	Yes	free books	Yes	Yes	No	Yes	—N/a
Bahrain	December 4, 2012	December 4, 2012	Yes	No	December 12, 2012	Yes	free books	Yes	Yes	No	Yes	—N/a
Barbados	December 4, 2012	December 4, 2012	Yes	No	No	Yes	free books	Yes	Yes	No	Yes	—N/a
Belarus	December 4, 2012	December 4, 2012	Yes	No	December 12, 2012	Yes	free books	Yes	Yes	No	Yes	$0.69–1.29
Belize	December 4, 2012	December 4, 2012	Yes	No	December 12, 2012	Yes	free books	Yes	Yes	No	Yes	—N/a
Bermuda	December 4, 2012	December 4, 2012	Yes	No	Yes	Yes	free books	Yes	Yes	No	Yes	—N/a
Botswana	December 4, 2012	December 4, 2012	Yes	No	December 12, 2012	Yes	free books	Yes	Yes	No	Yes	—N/a
Burkina Faso	December 4, 2012	December 4, 2012	Yes	No	No	Yes	free books	Yes	Yes	No	Yes	—N/a
British Virgin Islands	December 4, 2012	December 4, 2012	Yes	No	December 12, 2012	Yes	free books	Yes	Yes	No	Yes	—N/a
Cape Verde	December 4, 2012	December 4, 2012	Yes	No	December 12, 2012	Yes	free books	Yes	Yes	No	Yes	—N/a
Cayman Islands	December 4, 2012	December 4, 2012	Yes	No	December 12, 2012	Yes	free books	Yes	Yes	No	Yes	—N/a
Dominica	December 4, 2012	December 4, 2012	Yes	No	December 12, 2012	Yes	free books	Yes	Yes	No	Yes	—N/a
Egypt	December 4, 2012	December 4, 2012	Yes	No	December 12, 2012	Yes	free books	Yes	Yes	No	Yes	—N/a
Fiji	December 4, 2012	December 4, 2012	Yes	No	December 12, 2012	Yes	free books	Yes	Yes	No	Yes	—N/a
Gambia	December 4, 2012	December 4, 2012	Yes	No	December 12, 2012	Yes	free books	Yes	Yes	No	Yes	—N/a
Ghana	December 4, 2012	December 4, 2012	Yes	No	December 12, 2012	Yes	free books	Yes	Yes	No	Yes	—N/a
Grenada	December 4, 2012	December 4, 2012	Yes	No	December 12, 2012	Yes	free books	Yes	Yes	No	Yes	—N/a
Guinea-Bissau	December 4, 2012	December 4, 2012	Yes	No	December 12, 2012	Yes	free books	Yes	Yes	No	Yes	—N/a
India	December 4, 2012	December 4, 2012	Yes	No	December 4, 2012	Yes	free books	Yes	Yes	No	Yes	9–15 INR ($0.18–0.30)
Indonesia	December 4, 2012	December 4, 2012	Yes	No	December 4, 2012	Yes	free books	Yes	Yes	No	Yes	3000 – 7000 IDR
Israel	December 4, 2012	December 4, 2012	Yes	No	December 12, 2012	Yes	free books	Yes	Yes	No	Yes	1.90 – 3.90 ILS
Jordan	December 4, 2012	December 4, 2012	Yes	No	December 12, 2012	Yes	free books	Yes	Yes	No	Yes	—N/a
Kazakhstan	December 4, 2012	December 4, 2012	Yes	No	No	Yes	free books	Yes	Yes	No	Yes	—N/a
Kenya	December 4, 2012	December 4, 2012	Yes	No	No	Yes	free books	Yes	Yes	No	Yes	—N/a
Kyrgyzstan	December 4, 2012	December 4, 2012	Yes	No	No	Yes	free books	Yes	Yes	No	Yes	—N/a
Lebanon	December 4, 2012	December 4, 2012	Yes	No	December 12, 2012	Yes	free books	Yes	Yes	No	Yes	—N/a
Mauritius	December 4, 2012	December 4, 2012	Yes	No	December 12, 2012	Yes	free books	Yes	Yes	No	Yes	—N/a
Federated States of Micronesia	December 4, 2012	December 4, 2012	Yes	No	December 12, 2012	Yes	free books	Yes	Yes	No	Yes	—N/a
Republic of Moldova	December 4, 2012	December 4, 2012	Yes	No	December 12, 2012	Yes	free books	Yes	Yes	No	Yes	—N/a
Mongolia	December 4, 2012	December 4, 2012	Yes	No	December 12, 2012	Yes	free books	Yes	Yes	No	Yes	0.49 – 1.29 USD
Mozambique	December 4, 2012	December 4, 2012	Yes	No	December 12, 2012	Yes	free books	Yes	Yes	No	Yes	—N/a
Namibia	December 4, 2012	December 4, 2012	Yes	No	December 12, 2012	Yes	free books	Yes	Yes	No	Yes	—N/a
Nepal	December 4, 2012	December 4, 2012	Yes	No	No	Yes	free books	Yes	Yes	No	Yes	—N/a
Niger	December 4, 2012	December 4, 2012	Yes	No	December 12, 2012	Yes	free books	Yes	Yes	No	Yes	—N/a
Nigeria	December 4, 2012	December 4, 2012	Yes	No	December 12, 2012	Yes	free books	Yes	Yes	No	Yes	—N/a
Oman	December 4, 2012	December 4, 2012	Yes	No	December 12, 2012	Yes	free books	Yes	Yes	No	Yes	—N/a
Papua New Guinea	December 4, 2012	December 4, 2012	Yes	No	No	Yes	free books	Yes	Yes	No	Yes	—N/a
Qatar	December 4, 2012	December 4, 2012	Yes	No	December 12, 2012	Yes	free books	Yes	Yes	No	Yes	—N/a
Russia	December 4, 2012	December 4, 2012	April 21, 2008	No	December 4, 2012	April 21, 2008	free books	Yes	April 21, 2008	No	Yes	15 – 19 RUB ($0.49–0.62)
Saint Kitts and Nevis	December 4, 2012	December 4, 2012	Yes	No	December 12, 2012	Yes	free books	Yes	Yes	No	Yes	—N/a
Saudi Arabia	December 4, 2012	December 4, 2012	Yes	No	December 12, 2012	Yes	free books	Yes	Yes	No	Yes	—N/a
South Africa	December 4, 2012	December 4, 2012	Yes	No	December 12, 2012	Yes	free books	Yes	Yes	No	Yes	—N/a
Swaziland	December 4, 2012	December 4, 2012	Yes	No	December 12, 2012	Yes	free books	Yes	Yes	No	Yes	—N/a
Trinidad and Tobago	December 4, 2012	December 4, 2012	Yes	No	December 12, 2012	Yes	free books	Yes	Yes	No	Yes	—N/a
Turkey	December 4, 2012	December 4, 2012	Yes	No	December 4, 2012	Yes	free books	Yes	Yes	No	Yes	0.69 – 1.49 TRY
Tajikistan	December 4, 2012	December 4, 2012	Yes	No	December 12, 2012	Yes	free books	Yes	Yes	No	Yes	—N/a
Turkmenistan	December 4, 2012	December 4, 2012	Yes	No	December 12, 2012	Yes	free books	Yes	Yes	No	Yes	—N/a
Uganda	December 4, 2012	December 4, 2012	Yes	No	December 12, 2012	Yes	free books	Yes	Yes	No	Yes	—N/a
Ukraine	December 4, 2012	December 4, 2012	Yes	No	December 12, 2012	Yes	free books	Yes	Yes	No	Yes	—N/a
United Arab Emirates	December 4, 2012	December 4, 2012	Yes	No	December 12, 2012	Yes	free books	Yes	Yes	No	Yes	—N/a
Uzbekistan	December 4, 2012	December 4, 2012	Yes	No	No	Yes	free books	Yes	Yes	No	Yes	—N/a
Zimbabwe	December 4, 2012	December 4, 2012	Yes	No	December 12, 2012	Yes	free books	Yes	Yes	No	Yes	—N/a
Afghanistan	No	No	April 21, 2020	No	No	April 21, 2020	No	No	No	No	—N/a	—N/a
Albania	No	No	June 21, 2012	No	No	June 21, 2012	free books	No	June 21, 2012	No	Yes	—N/a
Algeria	No	No	Yes	No	No	Yes	free books	No	Yes	No	Yes	—N/a
Angola	No	No	Yes	No	No	Yes	free books	No	Yes	No	Yes	—N/a
Benin	No	No	June 21, 2012	No	No	June 21, 2012	free books	No	June 21, 2012	No	Yes	—N/a
Bhutan	No	No	June 21, 2012	No	No	June 21, 2012	free books	No	June 21, 2012	No	Yes	—N/a
Bosnia and Herzegovina	No	No	April 21, 2020	No	No	April 21, 2020	No	No	No	No	—N/a	—N/a
Cameroon	No	No	April 21, 2020	No	No	April 21, 2020	No	No	No	No	—N/a	—N/a
Chad	No	No	June 21, 2012	No	No	June 21, 2012	free books	No	June 21, 2012	No	No	—N/a
China	No	No	Yes	No	No	Yes	September 30, 2015	No	Yes	No	Yes	—N/a
Republic of the Congo	No	No	June 21, 2012	No	No	June 21, 2012	free books	No	June 21, 2012	No	No	—N/a
Croatia	No	No	Yes	No	No	Yes	free books	No	Yes	No	Yes	—N/a
Gabon	No	No	April 21, 2020	No	No	April 21, 2020	No	No	No	No	—N/a	—N/a
Georgia	No	No	April 21, 2020	No	No	April 21, 2020	No	No	No	No	—N/a	—N/a
Guyana	No	No	Yes	No	No	Yes	free books	No	Yes	No	Yes	—N/a
Iceland	No	No	Yes	No	No	Yes	free books	No	Yes	No	Yes	—N/a
Iraq	No	No	April 21, 2020	No	No	April 21, 2020	No	No	No	No	—N/a	—N/a
Ivory Coast	No	No	April 21, 2020	No	No	April 21, 2020	No	No	No	No	—N/a	—N/a
Jamaica	No	No	Yes	No	No	Yes	free books	No	Yes	No	Yes	—N/a
Kosovo	No	No	April 21, 2020	No	No	April 21, 2020	No	No	No	No	—N/a	—N/a
Korea, South	No	No	Yes	No	No	June 10, 2008	free books	No	Yes	No	Yes	—N/a
Kuwait	No	No	Yes	No	No	Yes	free books	No	Yes	No	Yes	—N/a
Liberia	No	No	June 21, 2012	No	No	June 21, 2012	free books	No	June 21, 2012	No	No	—N/a
Libya	No	No	April 21, 2020	No	No	April 21, 2020	No	No	No	No	—N/a	—N/a
Macedonia	No	No	Yes	No	No	Yes	free books	No	Yes	No	Yes	—N/a
Madagascar	No	No	Yes	No	No	Yes	free books	No	Yes	No	No	—N/a
Malawi	No	No	June 21, 2012	No	No	June 21, 2012	free books	No	June 21, 2012	No	Yes	—N/a
Maldives	No	No	April 21, 2020	No	No	April 21, 2020	No	No	No	No	—N/a	—N/a
Mali	No	No	Yes	No	No	Yes	free books	No	Yes	No	No	—N/a
Mauritania	No	No	June 21, 2012	No	No	June 21, 2012	free books	No	June 21, 2012	No	No	—N/a
Montenegro	No	No	April 21, 2020	No	No	April 21, 2020	No	No	No	No	—N/a	—N/a
Montserrat	No	No	Yes	No	No	Yes	free books	No	Yes	No	Yes	—N/a
Morocco	No	No	April 21, 2020	No	No	April 21, 2020	No	No	No	No	—N/a	—N/a
Mozambique	No	No	April 21, 2020	No	No	April 21, 2020	No	No	No	No	—N/a	—N/a
Myanmar	No	No	April 21, 2020	No	No	April 21, 2020	No	No	No	No	—N/a	—N/a
Nauru	No	No	April 21, 2020	No	No	April 21, 2020	No	No	No	No	—N/a	—N/a
Pakistan	No	No	Yes	No	No	Yes	free books	No	Yes	No	Yes	—N/a
Palau	No	No	June 21, 2012	No	No	June 21, 2012	free books	No	June 21, 2012	No	Yes	—N/a
Rwanda	No	No	April 21, 2020	No	No	April 21, 2020	No	No	No	No	—N/a	—N/a
Saint Lucia	No	No	Yes	No	No	Yes	free books	No	Yes	No	Yes	—N/a
Saint Vincent and the Grenadines	No	No	Yes	No	No	Yes	free books	No	Yes	No	Yes	—N/a
São Tomé and Príncipe	No	No	June 21, 2012	No	No	June 21, 2012	free books	No	June 21, 2012	No	Yes	—N/a
Senegal	No	No	Yes	No	No	Yes	free books	No	Yes	No	No	—N/a
Serbia	No	No	April 21, 2020	No	No	April 21, 2020	No	No	No	No	—N/a	—N/a
Seychelles	No	No	June 21, 2012	No	No	June 21, 2012	free books	No	June 21, 2012	No	Yes	—N/a
Sierra Leone	No	No	June 21, 2012	No	No	June 21, 2012	free books	No	June 21, 2012	No	Yes	—N/a
Solomon Islands	No	No	June 21, 2012	No	No	June 21, 2012	free books	No	June 21, 2012	No	Yes	—N/a
Suriname	No	No	Yes	No	No	Yes	free books	No	Yes	No	Yes	—N/a
Tanzania	No	No	Yes	No	No	Yes	free books	No	Yes	No	Yes	—N/a
Tonga	No	No	April 21, 2020	No	No	April 21, 2020	No	No	No	No	—N/a	—N/a
Tunisia	No	No	Yes	No	No	Yes	free books	No	Yes	No	Yes	—N/a
Turks and Caicos Islands	No	No	Yes	No	No	Yes	free books	No	Yes	No	Yes	—N/a
Uruguay	No	No	Yes	No	No	Yes	free books	No	Yes	No	Yes	—N/a
Vanuatu	No	No	April 21, 2020	No	No	April 21, 2020	No	No	No	No	—N/a	—N/a
Yemen	No	No	Yes	No	No	Yes	free books	No	Yes	No	Yes	—N/a
Zambia	No	No	April 21, 2020	No	No	April 21, 2020	No	No	No	No	—N/a	—N/a
Country	Music	Music Videos	Podcasts	TV shows	Movies	Apps	Books	iTunes Match	iTunes U	iTunes Radio	Affiliate program	Price/song
Country	Product type										Affiliate program	Price/song

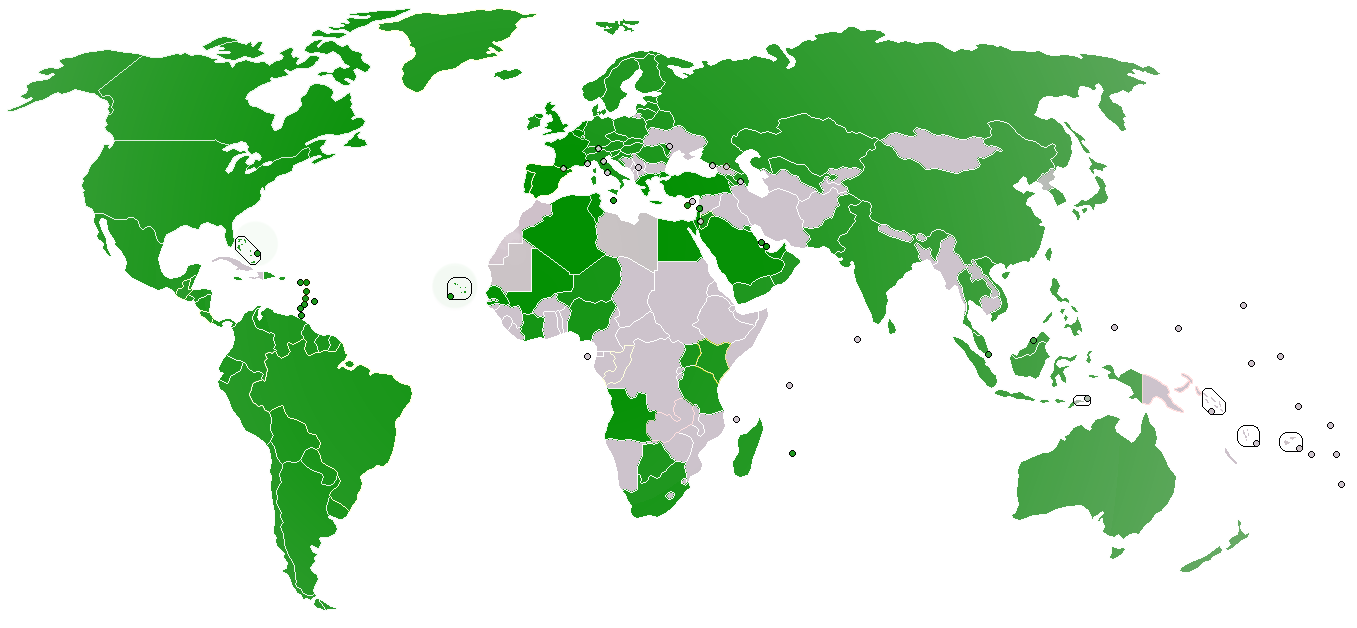
The countries where the iTunes Store is available are shown in green.

To buy files through the store, a user must either use a Mac, iPhone or iPad device or install the proprietary digital media player iTunes to access the store. This software is available only for certain versions of the Macintosh or Windows operating systems.

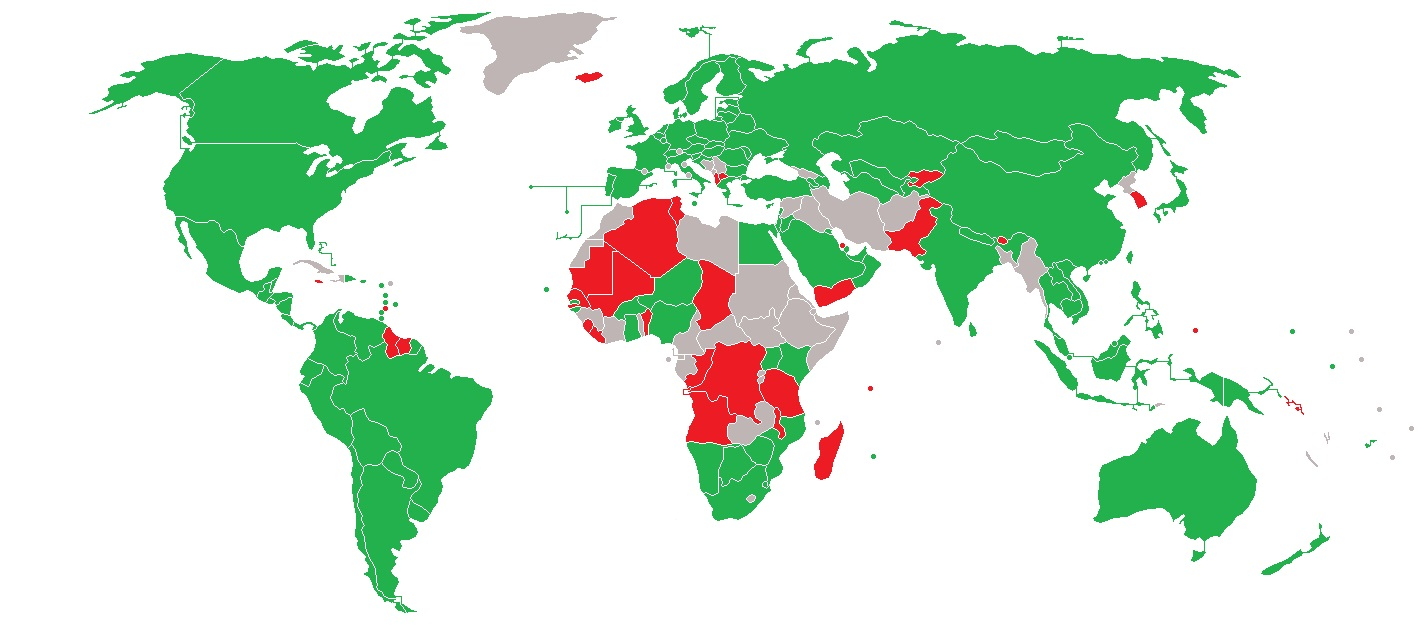
iTunes Store availability. Green: full functionality (music, apps, videos, etc.). Red: available, but with limitations (only apps, iTunes U, etc.).

- According to an Apple press release, the European iTunes Music Stores sold a combined total of 800,000 songs in one week, with 450,000 of those songs sold in the UK.
- The Italian, Portuguese, Dutch, Greek stores have been localized.
- On December 3, 2004, the British Office of Fair Trading referred iTunes Music Store to the European Commission because it prevents consumers in one EU country from buying music from stores in other EU countries, in violation of EU free-trade legislation; the immediate cause of the referral was because the €0.99 price charged in the Eurozone equates to £0.68 in sterling, rather than the £0.79 actually charged there.
- In the US and Canada, sales tax is not included in the purchase price of items, unlike in other countries.
- iTunes Music Store in Japan had 1 million songs available at start. In the next four days the store had sold one million songs – the pace faster than that of the US store. In addition to a long delay, Apple failed to have one set price for singles. Pundits speculated that this may have indicated the introduction of new price structure to the rest of the stores in future, in favor of record labels who would like to see higher prices for new songs. This extension to other countries was announced in January 2009.
- The release of video-capable iPods also saw the store launch in Australia with music videos and short films by Pixar. iTunes Gift Cards (as they are now known) are now also available in many more stores such as JB Hi-Fi, David Jones, and the Woolworths chain of stores. Access was inadvertently given to some people in New Zealand, too. Failed negotiations with the Sony BMG label meant that none of that label's artists were available at the time of launch; they were later added on January 17, 2006.
- New Zealand users had briefly been able to buy from the Australian store when it first opened until that loophole was closed.
- On November 1, 2006, the store started offering a range of Latino content including television shows and music for its Hispanic American, Mexican and Puerto Rican clients.
- The Spanish used on the Mexican store has been modified to Mexican Spanish.
- As of the 2009 Macworld Conference & Expo, Apple had given no new information of the (possible; future) inclusion and expansion of music videos, TV-shows and movies in other European countries. The stores of the UK, Germany and France currently remain the only European Stores with local and/or localized selections of TV-shows, movies and music videos.

=== Payment options ===
A user must also pay with an iTunes gift card or a credit card with a billing address in Australia, Austria, Belgium, Brunei, Bulgaria, Brazil, Cambodia, Canada, Colombia, the Czech Republic, Cyprus, Denmark, Estonia, Finland, France, Germany, Greece, Hong Kong, Hungary, India, Indonesia, the Republic of Ireland, Italy, Japan, Laos, Latvia, Lithuania, Luxembourg, Macau, Malaysia, Malta, Mexico, the Netherlands, New Zealand, Norway, Philippines, Poland, Portugal, Puerto Rico, Romania, Russia, Singapore, Slovakia, Slovenia, Spain, Sri Lanka, Sweden, Switzerland, Taiwan, Thailand, Turkey, United Kingdom, the United States or Vietnam.

Apple also offers other payment methods (like PayPal), which differ from country to country. Residents in other countries can only buy a gift card from a merchant or download free podcasts and previews.

== Digital rights management ==
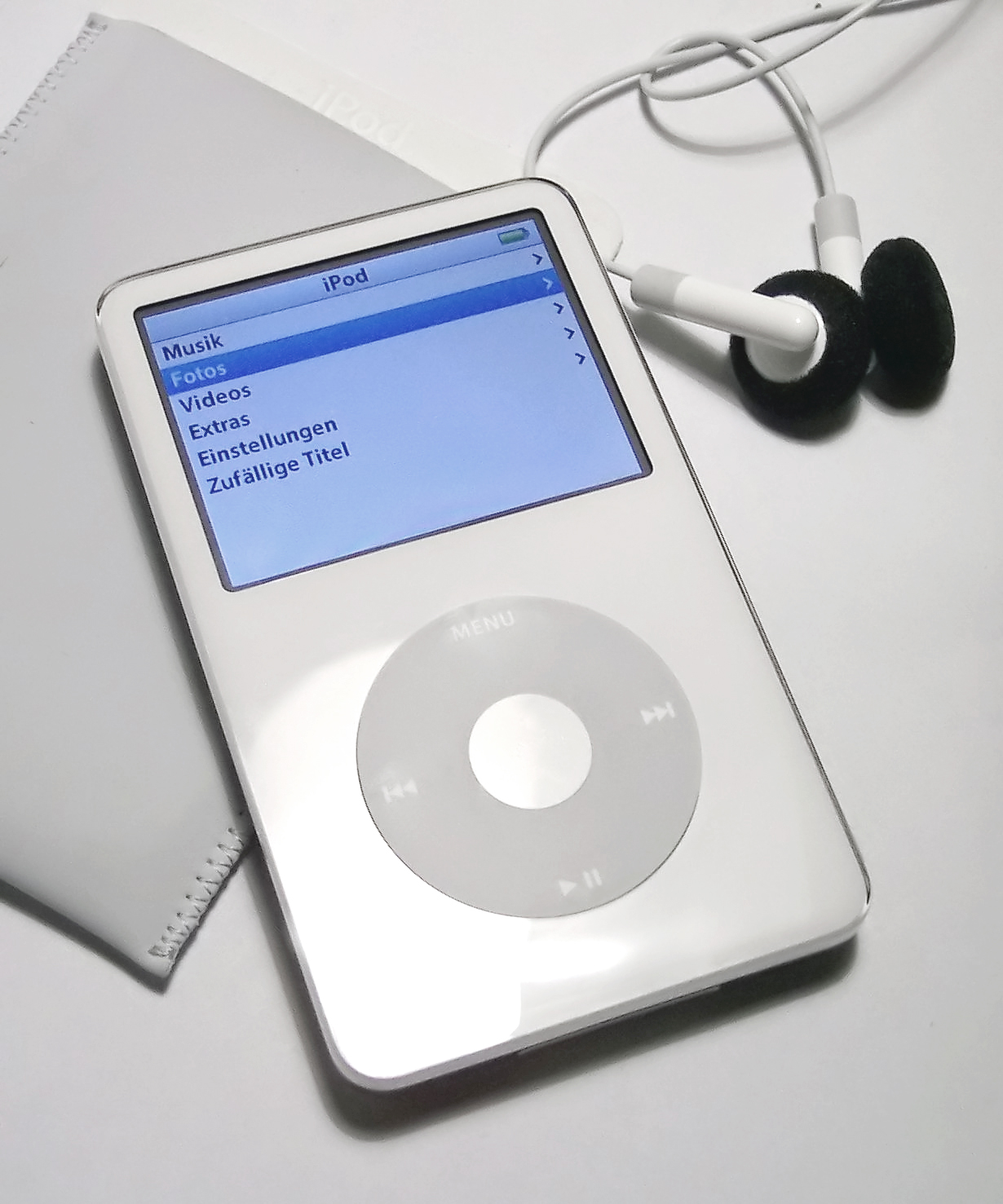
A fifth-generation iPod with earphones. The only portable devices licensed to play protected music from the iTunes Store are iPods, the iPhone, the iPod Touch, the iPad and selected Motorola mobile phones, such as the ROKR.

In the past, the iTunes Store used Apple's FairPlay digital rights management (DRM) technology. FairPlay was built into the MP4 multimedia file format as an encrypted AAC audio layer, and was used by the company to protect copyrighted works sold through the store, allowing only authorized devices to play the content. The restrictions imposed by FairPlay, mainly limited device compatibility, sparked criticism, with a lawsuit alleging antitrust violation that was eventually closed in Apple's favor, and various successful efforts to remove the DRM protection from files, with Apple continually updating its software to counteract such projects.

In February 2007, an open letter by Steve Jobs, Apple's CEO, discussed the use of DRM on music, raising points about the future of the protection and announced the company's support for ending the use of DRM. Although the open letter initially caused mixed industry reactions, Apple signed a deal with EMI, a record label, the following month in order to offer iTunes customers a purchase option called "iTunes Plus", for a higher-quality, DRM-free version of all of EMI's tracks. In January 2009, Apple signed deals with all major record labels as well as a large number of independent labels in order to begin to offer most iTunes music DRM-free. On January 6, 2009, Apple announced that DRM had been removed from 80% of its music catalog in the US. Full DRM-free "iTunes Plus" music availability was achieved in the US on April 7, 2009, coinciding with the introduction of a three-tiered pricing model. This does not apply to songs downloaded using Apple Music, Apple's subscription-based music streaming service. Television episodes, many books, and films are still "FairPlay" DRM-protected.

== Promotions ==
On Super Bowl Sunday, February 1, 2004, Apple launched a promotion with Pepsi in which they gave away 100 million songs, through tokens on selected soft drink bottle caps. Unfortunately for Apple, Pepsi failed to properly distribute the bottles to major metropolitan areas until only weeks before the promotion ended, despite a one-month extension of the deadline by Apple. The promotion was repeated beginning January 31, 2005, with 200 million songs available, and an iPod Mini given away every hour.

On July 1, 2004, Apple announced that, starting with the sale of the 95 millionth song, an iPod would be given away to the buyer of each 100 thousandth song, for a total of 50 iPods. The buyer of the 100 millionth song would receive a PowerBook, iPod, and US$10,000 gift certificate to iTunes Music Store.

Ten days later, on July 11, Apple announced that 100 million songs had been sold through iTunes Music Store. The 100 millionth song was titled "Somersault (Dangermouse Remix)" by Zero 7, purchased by Kevin Britten of Hays, Kansas. He then received a phone call from Apple CEO Steve Jobs, who offered his congratulations, as well as a 40 GB 3rd Generation iPod laser-engraved with a message of thanks.

Inspired by Pepsi's marketing success with iTunes giveaways, Coca-Cola partnered with 7-Eleven to give away a free iTunes song with every 32 US fl oz (950 ml). Slurpee frozen beverage until July 31, 2005. Songs could be redeemed until August 31, 2005, by entering a code printed on the Slurpee cup into iTunes Music Store application. Coca-Cola did this in spite of having its own music store, myCokeMusic.com, that competed with iTunes Music Store in Europe. myCokeMusic.com ceased business on July 31, 2006.

On July 5, 2005, Apple announced that they were counting down to half a billion songs. The buyer of every 100 thousandth song up to 500 million would receive an iPod Mini and a 50-song gift card. The grand prize for the person who downloads the 500 millionth song was 10 iPods of their choice, a 10,000-song gift card, 10 50-song gift cards or 4 tickets to the Coldplay world tour. Twelve days later, on July 17, Apple announced that 500 million songs had been sold through iTunes Music Store. The 500 millionth song, purchased by Amy Greer of Lafayette, Indiana, was "Mississippi Girl" by Faith Hill.

On July 28, 2005, Apple and The Gap announced a promotion to award iTunes music downloads to Gap customers who tried on a pair of Gap jeans. From August 8 to 31, 2005, each customer who tried on any pair of Gap jeans could receive a free download for a song of their choice from iTunes Music Store.

On February 7, 2006, Apple announced that they were counting down to the billionth song download and began a promotion similar to the previous 100 million and 500 million countdown. Whoever downloaded the billionth song would receive a 20" iMac, ten 60 GB iPods, and a US$10,000 iTunes Music Card. The billionth song was purchased on February 23, 2006, by Alex Ostrovsky of West Bloomfield, Michigan. The purchased song was "Speed of Sound" as part of Coldplay's X&Y album.

On July 25, 2006, Facebook and iTunes began offering a promotion where members of the Apple Students group would receive a free 25 song sampler each week until September 30 in various music genres. The idea behind the promotion was to get students more familiar and enthusiastic with each service as Autumn classes approached. However, in order to prevent abuse of the promotion, the weekly code that Facebook provided stopped working after it was redeemed one million times. In addition, the promotion caused discontent among international students, as the code was only valid in the US iTunes Music Store.

On April 10, 2009, Apple announced that it will be counting down to the billionth app (apps being the applications for iPod Touch and iPhone). Apple launched a continuous counter to the billionth app on Good Friday. Connor Mulcahey, age 13 of Weston, CT, downloaded the billionth app, "Bump" by Bump Technologies, and received a 17" MacBook Pro, a 32GB iPod Touch, a Time Capsule, and a $10,000 Gift Card for the iTunes Store.

On February 11, 2010, Apple announced that it would be counting down to 10 billion songs downloaded. A $10,000 gift card was offered as a prize. On February 24, 2010, the 10 billionth song, "Guess Things Happen That Way" by Johnny Cash, was purchased by Louie Sulcer of Woodstock, Georgia.

== Technical details ==
Store pages are delivered using standard HTML with a special header. This change was made when iTunes 9.0 was released. iTunes uses WebKit to render these pages on the screen. These pages are also accessible on the Web, at iTunes.apple.com, allowing pages from the iTunes Store to show up in search engine search results.

Prior to iTunes 9.0, the iTunes Store was delivered using a custom XML format that describes the position of all of the elements, boxes, album art and all of their properties – including whether a reference link can be dragged out of iTunes and into another document.

The store's back-end software uses WebObjects – Apple's own application server it acquired from NeXT. Content is uploaded to iTunes data store using an internal Apple program called iTunes Producer, which automatically encodes and adds metadata to uploaded files.

Apple has created its own lossless audio compression technology, known as Apple Lossless Audio Codec (ALAC). Alongside AAC, the entire Apple Music catalog is now also encoded with ALAC, offering resolutions from 16-bit/44.1 kHz (CD Quality) up to 24-bit/192 kHz.

Artists and record labels can upload music compliant to Apple's mastering standards, Apple Digital Masters, which encourages mastering engineers to provide high-resolution, 24-bit audio files for optimal sound quality.

== Legal disputes ==
=== Apple Records ===
For three years, The Beatles' record company Apple Records were in a legal dispute, Apple Corps v Apple Computer, with Apple Computer over the name "Apple." On May 8, 2006, a ruling was declared in favor of Apple Computer, but Apple Records said it would appeal the ruling. Despite this, plans were announced by Neil Aspinall in April 2006 to remaster completely and release the entire Beatles catalog on an unspecified online music service, as well as release some previously unheard work by the band. No date was set at that time. It has also been reported that the Beatles' music catalog might initially be appearing on iTunes only, as Apple is reported to be negotiating with Britain's EMI group over an online distribution deal that might be exclusive for a limited time.

During his Macworld Keynote address on January 9, 2007, Apple CEO Steve Jobs used the band's song "With a Little Help from My Friends," followed by "Lovely Rita," to introduce the music-playing capabilities of the company's new iPhone. This was regarded by industry observers as further evidence that the Beatles catalog would be introduced to iTunes Music Store catalog in the near future. On February 5, 2007, Apple Corps and Apple Inc. announced they had reached a settlement in their legal dispute.

In a related development, Apple announced on August 14, 2007, that the entire solo catalog of John Lennon would be available on iTunes. The solo catalogs of the other three Beatles, Paul McCartney, Ringo Starr, and George Harrison, are also available on iTunes.

On November 16, 2010, the entire Beatles catalog was officially made available on the iTunes Store.

=== The Consumer Council of Norway EULA challenge ===
On June 6, 2006, The Consumer Ombudsmen in Norway, Sweden and Denmark launched a common open letter to Apple regarding the EULA of iTunes through the Norwegian Consumer Ombudsman Bjørn Erik Thon. The iTunes case is based upon an official complaint filed by The Consumer Council of Norway on January 25, 2006.

The main allegations were that:

- The EULA is unbalanced to disfavor the customer. Scandinavian law requires any written agreement to favor both parties. The weak party also enjoys protection from exploitation according to Norwegian consumer laws.
- The iTunes Store's use of Digital rights management limits the number of devices purchased songs can be played on.
- iTunes' contract entitles the company to at any time change the terms of the contract without notice, including the selection of players or software that must be used for iTunes files, and also the number of times a customer can change or copy already purchased files.
- The EULA is both vague and hard to understand for the customers.
- The EULA states that the legal relationship between the company and customers is regulated by English contract law. It is unreasonable to expect Norwegian consumers to have comprehensive knowledge of English law. Products marketed to Norwegian consumers in Norway are subject to Norwegian law—a right that cannot be waived by a clause in a company's standard customer contract.
- The EULA removes iTunes' responsibility regarding damage to the consumer's computer caused by software errors even though responsibility cannot be waived in Scandinavian Law.

Apple responded July 31, 2006.

On January 22, 2007, German and French consumer groups joined forces with Norway and Finland. Their goal is to create a united European front against iTunes (Germany and France have each had their own negotiation process with iTunes). According to the press statement Apple is in favor of this. The key points in the negotiations were:

- Interoperability: the consumer should have the right and ability to play his or her music on any device of his or her own choice.
- Change of conditions: iTunes must revoke their right to change the terms and conditions (EULA) at any time without the consent of the consumer.
- Liability: iTunes should change its clause limiting its liability to recover consumer damages if they are caused by content sold by iTunes.
- Applicable Law: Consumers entering into a contract with iTunes should be able to rely on the consumer protection rules according to the law of the country in which they live.

==== EU antitrust case ====
In 2004, Which? magazine complained to the European Commission about the higher prices in the UK for the same songs sold in other parts of the European Union: typically €0.99 in the rest of the EU and £0.79 in the UK. In 2008, the Commission withdrew its investigation after Apple agreed to end the price disparity.

== Content disputes ==
=== Universal Music Group ===
On July 1, 2007, The New York Times reported that Universal (the world's largest music corporation at the time of writing) would not renew its annual contract to sell music through iTunes. Instead, Universal said that it would market music to Apple at will, allowing it to remove its songs from the iTunes service on short notice if the two sides did not agree on pricing or other terms.

On August 9, 2007, UMG announced a plan to sell some songs in MP3 format, without Digital rights management, through a variety of online services such as Amazon Music and the newly created gBox. While these tracks continue to be available through the iTunes Store, Universal chose to license these songs in DRM-free formats only through other services.

=== NBCUniversal TV series ===
On August 31, 2007, Apple announced that programs on NBC's 2007–08 television schedule would not be available on iTunes. NBC had informed Apple the previous day that it would not be renewing its contract. It was later clarified that this change only applied to series produced by NBCUniversal-owned Universal Television, including Universal-produced shows on other networks such as House. NBC programs produced by other studios, such as Chuck (Warner Bros.) and Journeyman (20th Century Fox), would remain available on iTunes.

Apple has publicly asserted that NBC would only renew their contract if Apple agreed to a price increase of US$4.99 per episode, which they did not. NBC disputes that claim, claiming that Apple balked at NBC's request to package shows together and make wholesale pricing more flexible. NBC claims that they never asked to double the wholesale price and insisted that their shows would be sold by the iTunes Store through early December. Other networks who sold their shows via iTunes did not follow suit. On December 1, 2007, NBC shows were pulled from the iTunes Store.

On September 9, 2008, Apple and NBCUniversal announced that NBC's TV shows were once again available on the US iTunes Store.

The UK iTunes Store has many shows from NBC available, although they are distributed by Universal Studios. The pricing for these seasons are higher than they were on the US store, an example being, Season 3 of The Office is priced at £43 (2008) (equivalent to £65 or US$83 in 2024) vs. US$52.99 (equivalent to $79.24 in 2025) (HD version from US store).

== See also ==
- iTunes
- Apple Music
- iTunes Festival
- Apple Inc.
- Apple TV
- iBookstore
- Comparison of digital music stores
