= Levant (wind) =

Wind in the western Mediterranean

The winds of the Mediterranean

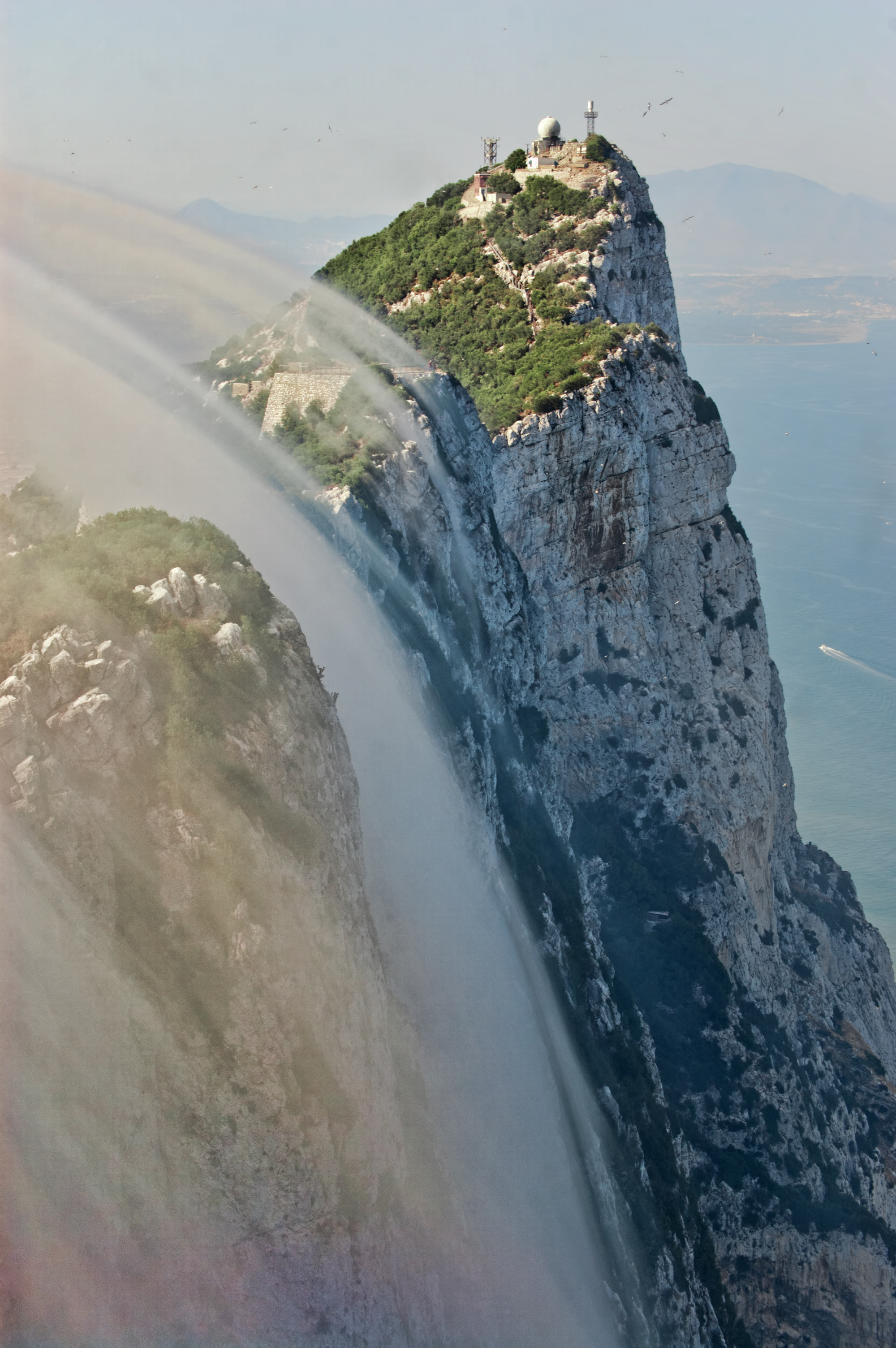
Levant cloud forming against the eastern cliffs of the Rock of Gibraltar.

The levant (Catalan: Llevant, Italian: Levante, Maltese: Lvant, Greek: Λεβάντες, Spanish: Levante) is an easterly wind that blows in the western Mediterranean Sea and southern France, an example of mountain-gap wind. In Roussillon it is called "llevant" and in Corsica "levante". In the western Mediterranean, particularly when the wind blows through the Strait of Gibraltar, it is called the Viento de Levante or the Levanter. It is also known as the Solano or "charqui" in northern Morocco.

When blowing moderately or strongly, the levant causes heavy swells on the Mediterranean. Usually gentle and damp, the levant frequently brings clouds and rain. When it brings good weather, it is known as the "levant blanc", or "levante calma" in Gibraltar.

The origin of the name is the same as that of the name Levant for the region of the eastern Mediterranean: it is the Latin word "levante", the participle of levare "to raise" – as in sol levante "rising sun". It thus referred to the eastern direction of the rising sun.

== Etymology ==
The name of the wind pattern entered English from Middle French levante (French: rising), the sun rises in the east, the perceived origin point of the wind and rain. It is used to describe the direction east, the wind coming from the east, as well as a general term for the lands bordering the eastern Mediterranean.

== Description ==
The wind rises in the central Mediterranean or around the Balearic Islands and blows westwards reaching its greatest intensity through the Strait of Gibraltar. The winds are moist carrying fog and precipitation in the eastern side of the Strait, but dry in the western side, as the moisture rains on the mountains between Algeciras and Tarifa. The winds are well known for creating a particular cloud formation above the Rock of Gibraltar; In Almería, the winds are well known for making the temperatures rise as the wind blows across the desert interior of the province. The Levanter winds can occur at any time in the year, but are most common from May to October.

== The Strait of Gibraltar ==
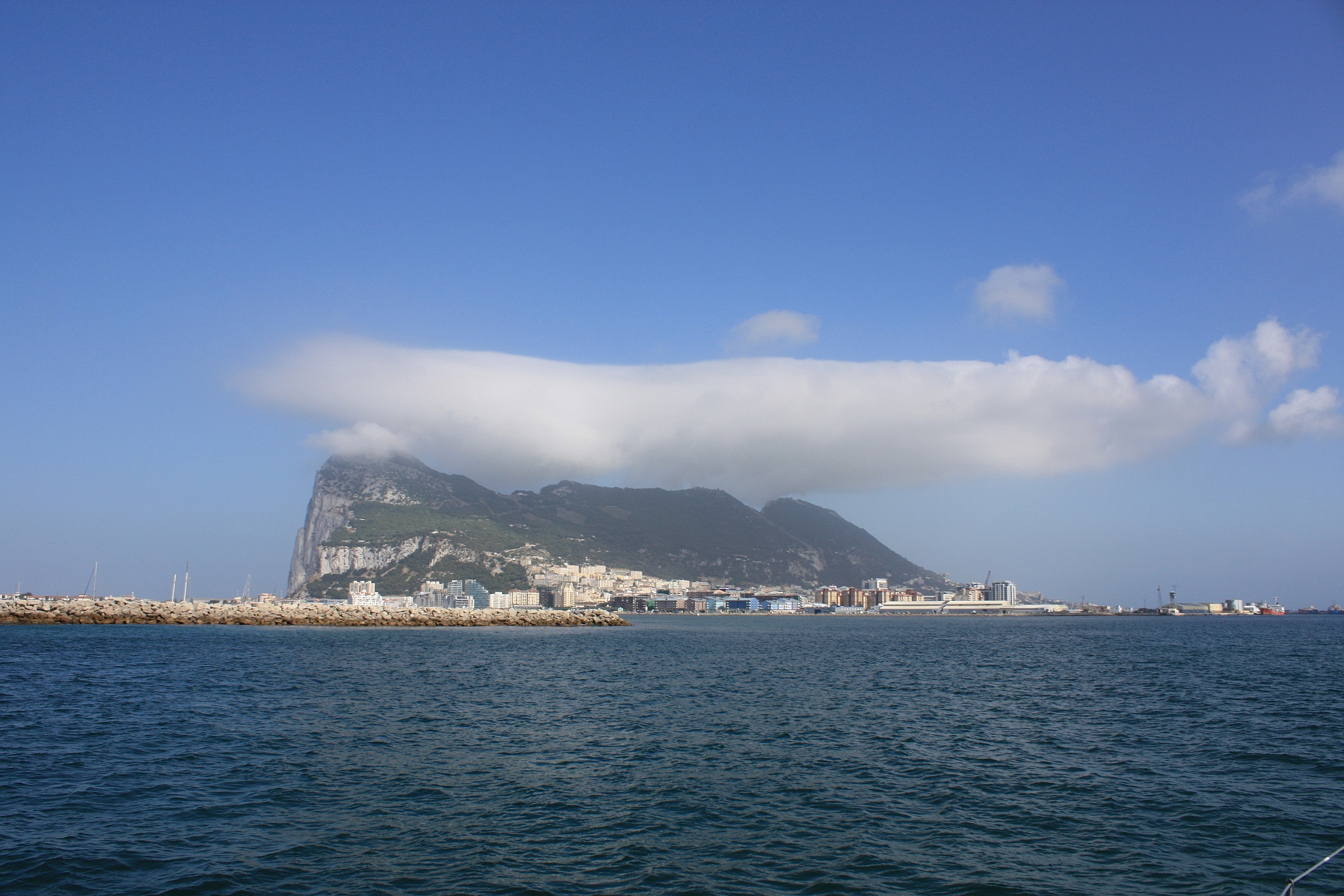
Levant cloud hanging over the Rock of Gibraltar.

The Strait of Gibraltar, located at the western entrance to the Mediterranean Sea, is frequently associated with strong gap winds that can produce dangerous seas, especially when they blow against tide, current or swell through the Strait, which is a narrow sea-level passage about 15 km (9.3 mi) wide and 55 km (34 mi) long that is surrounded by terrain reaching several thousand feet.

The most pronounced gap wind through the Strait, the Levanter, can produce winds of 20 to 40 kn (40 to 70 km/h) in and to the west of the gap when there is higher pressure to the east, over the Mediterranean, with lower pressure to the west of Gibraltar. The sinking motions accompanying such anticyclonic conditions cause stability in the low-level air flow, strongly suppressing vertical air motion and may result in the formation of an inversion within a few thousand feet of the surface. Such an inversion provides a cap that contains the low-level air and results in greater topographic blocking and the acceleration of the airflow through the gap forming the Strait. Under such circumstances, the winds can go from a moderate or fresh easterly over the Alboran Sea (the western part of the Mediterranean) to gale force strength on the western side of the Strait and to its west. Because the flow is accelerating and there is often a significant pressure gradient through the Strait, the strongest winds are not observed mid-Strait, as might be expected if the funnel mechanism was dominant; rather, the strongest winds are in the western Strait and immediately downwind to the west. Levanters are most frequent during the warm season from April until October and often reach a peak in spring, when the Mediterranean is comparatively cool, increasing the stability of the low-level air flow.

== The Gibraltar levanter cloud ==
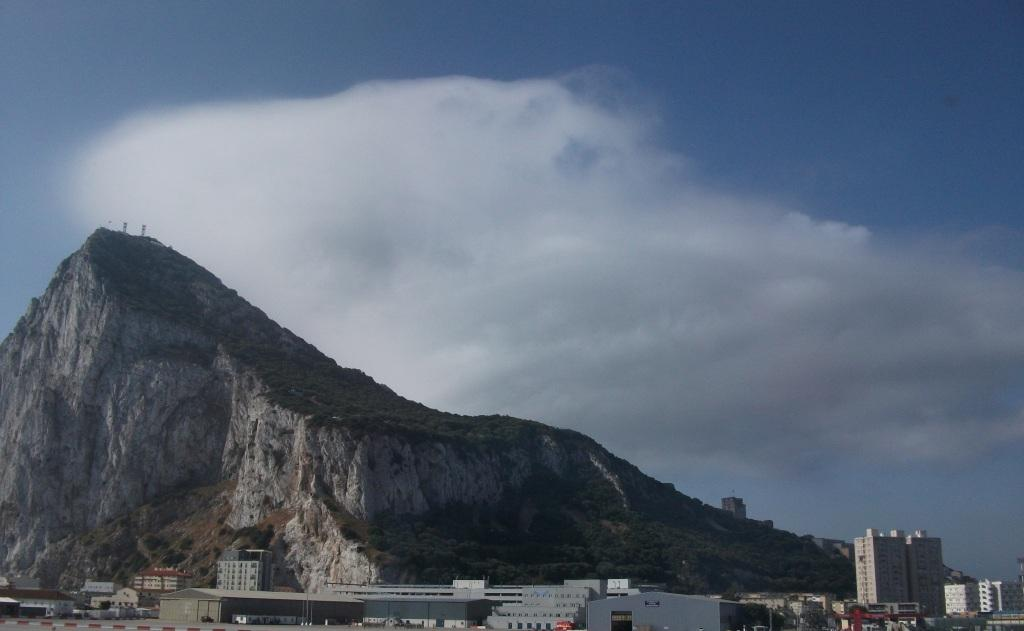
The cap cloud that forms in moist stable easterly winds over the Rock of Gibraltar

Sometimes the levanter forms a characteristic cloud named "banner-cloud" over the Rock of Gibraltar. However, this is not always the case and a particular set of conditions is required for its formation.

Near the surface, the levanter is moist, but is unsaturated. As the moist air, which must be capped to be stable and so unable to rise by convection, is forced to rise over the Rock, the moisture condenses to form a cloud that streams away west from its top. If wind speeds are too low and stability high in the near-surface layer, the cloud does not form and condensation is also sensitive to small changes in moisture content, such that when the wind across the Rock veers into the southeast, the flow becomes too dry for the cloud to form, bringing drier air from North Africa. When the wind speed is too low, the air is blocked and unable to rise to form the cloud. At high wind speeds, the turbulent mixing to the lee of the Rock distributes the moisture through a comparatively deep layer and the cloud is, at best, very broken. Often it dissolves immediately west of the Rock in these turbulent windy conditions.

In suitable conditions, the characteristic "pennant" cloud forms downwind. It usually extends about 5 km (3 mi) west from the top of the Rock in a turbulent plume. (Similar clouds may sometimes be seen elsewhere – notably the pennant cloud that forms on the Matterhorn in Switzerland.) This cloud hangs over the centre of the city of Gibraltar, while there is usually sunny weather in to the north and south from the southern outskirts of the city.

On the western side of the Rock, the winds near sea level are often from the west or southwest, as the air forms large overturning rolls, more than 350 m (1,100 ft) deep in the lee protection of the mountain, but strong winds tend to alter this flow regime.

The pennant cloud is not seen in westerly winds, although many of the same processes occur - it is just that the air is usually drier and may be warmer, as well as being less stable – so that convection from the surface is deeper and not capped near the mountaintop level. (Low cloud can sometimes be seen on the Rock, early in the morning in westerly winds, but this disappears as temperatures rise. It is also likely that the very steep eastern slope of the Rock tends to make the downwind flow too turbulent for cloud formation.)

Around dawn, the flow is relatively smooth through the cloud, but later in the morning, as it becomes warmer, some convective overturning develops within the plume as temperatures rise.

Formation of the cloud is classically very near the top of the ridge-line of the Rock at nearly 400 m (1,300 ft) altitude, but the base is usually a little lower in the turbulent flow to the west. The top of the cloud is rarely much more than 450 m (1,500 ft) above Gibraltar Bay.

== Strong winds across the Rock ==
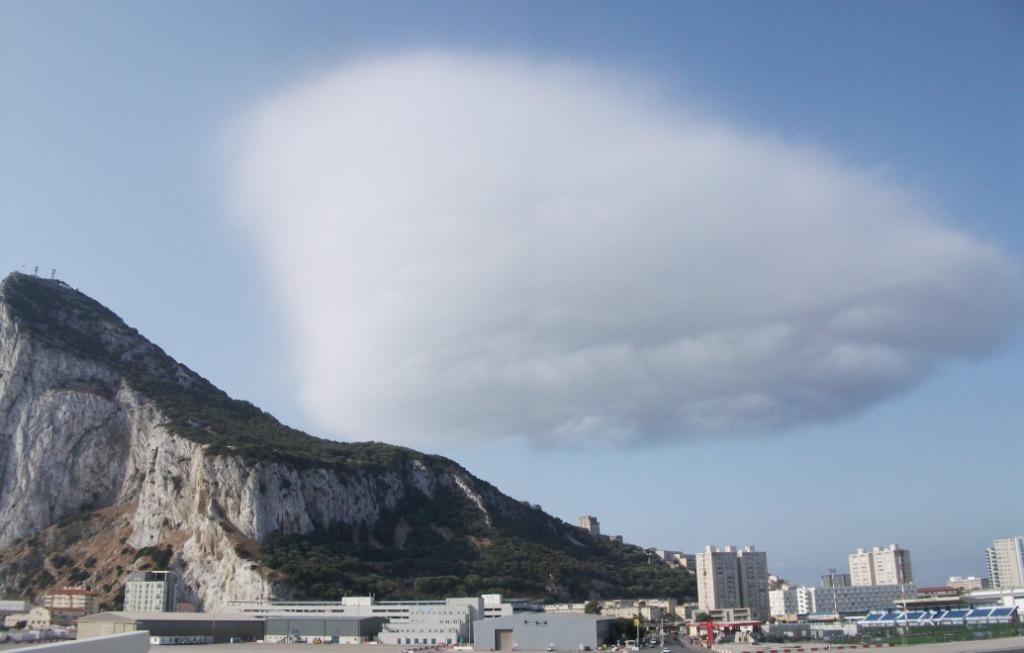
The Levanter cloud becoming detached from the crest of the Rock in strong easterly winds

When winds are very strong across the crest of the Rock, usually in excess of 15 m/s (34 mph), the cloud becomes detached from the crest of the Rock forming west of a line parallel to the ridge up to about 100 m (300 ft) from it. At the same time, curved arcs of cloud may be seen within or below the pennant cloud, indicating the formation of a roll cloud. Usually, this produces light and rather variable winds near sea level, at times forming a cyclonic circulation area over Gibraltar Bay and the town. However, at times, the strong winds break away from the crest of the Rock, producing gusts to about the speed of the wind over the crest. These winds are usually northeasterly or easterly and may be several Beaufort forces stronger than the mean wind before and after.

== In popular culture ==
- This wind is a namesake for a song by Gibraltarian Flamenco Metal band Breed 77, who titled a track from their 2006 In My Blood (En Mi Sangre) album "Viento De Levante".
- In his novel The Alchemist, Paulo Coelho refers to the Levante, describing the wind that brought the Moors to Spain.
- The Levante is mentioned in the historical fiction novel The Hundred Days by Patrick O'Brian.
- Clé: Levanter is the name of the mini-album by a Korean band Stray Kids, released on December 9, 2019. The title track of the album is also titled Levanter.
- Levante is a model of the Italian car manufacturer Maserati.
- According to a common superstition, saying the wind's name will summon its rage. West of the Strait locals refer to the wind as "el bicho" ("the critter") or "el innombrable" (the unmentionable).

== See also ==
- Winds of Provence
