= Tramontane =

Mediterranean wind direction

The winds of the Mediterranean

Tramontane (/trəˈmɒnteɪn/ trə-MON-tayn) (Note: Catalan: tramuntana [tɾəmunˈtanə]; French: tramontane [tʁamɔ̃tan]; Greek: τραμουντάνα, romanized: tramountána, IPA: [tramunˈdana]; Italian: tramontana [tramonˈtaːna]; Latin: trānsmontānus [traːnsmɔnˈtaːnʊs]; Maltese: tramuntana [trɐmʊnˈtɐːnɐ]; Slovene: tramontana [tramɔnˈtáːna]; Serbo-Croatian: tramontana [tramǒntaːna]; Spanish: tramontana [tɾamonˈtana].) is a classical name for a northern wind. The exact form of the name and precise direction varies from country to country. The word came to English from Italian tramontana, which developed from Latin trānsmontānus (trāns- + montānus), "beyond/across the mountains", referring to the Alps in the North of Italy. The word has other non-wind-related senses: it can refer to anything that comes from, or anyone who lives on, the other side of mountains, or even more generally, anything seen as foreign, strange, or even barbarous.

== Traditions in various countries and regions ==
=== Spain ===
In Spain, the wind is called tramuntana [tɾəmunˈtanə] or [tɾamunˈtana] in Catalan and tramontana [tɾamonˈtana] in Spanish, Galician and Basque. The wind also lends its name to the Serra de Tramuntana in Mallorca. The wind is prevalent in the northern Mediterranean coast (Catalonia, Mallorca, Menorca) and can be so strong as to be disturbing; there is a saying in Catalan culture (especially in Empordà) that refers to a person as "touched by tramuntana" (tocat per la tramuntana) when they behave oddly or seem to have lost their marbles. Salvador Dalí was often referred to as someone tocat per la tramuntana in his native Empordà.

=== Croatia ===
On the Croatian Adriatic coast, it is called tramontana (pronounced tramòntāna, [tramǒntaːna] in Dalmatia), with a number of local variations (termuntana, trmuntana, t(a)rmuntona and others). Like levant, it is considered a transitional wind, associated with the change of weather, which frequently transforms into bora. Like bora, it is a strong wind capable of generating large waves, but is less gusty.

=== France ===
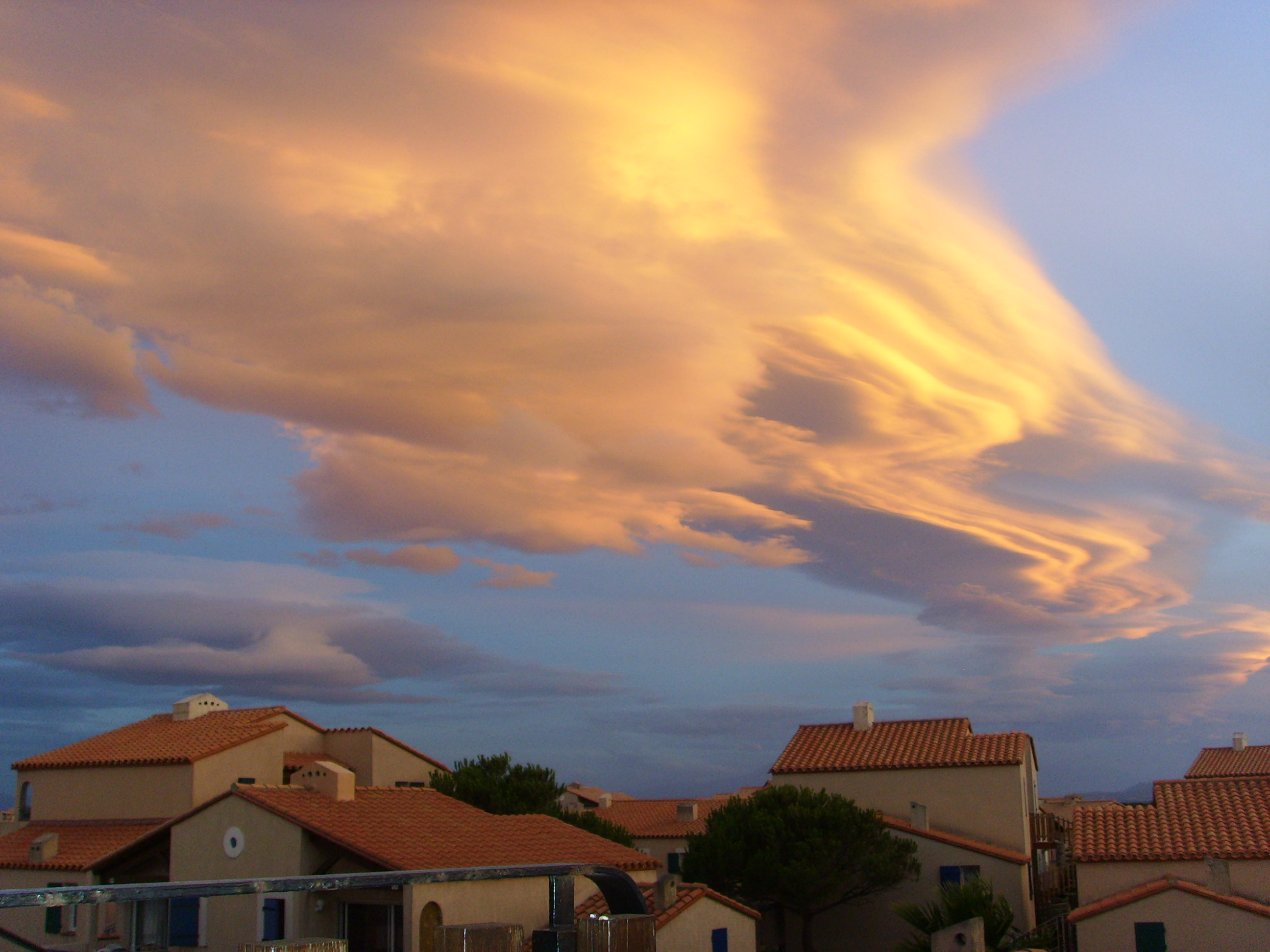
Tramontane clouds, Port-Leucate (Aude), south-central France

The tramontane [tʁa.mɔ̃.tan] in France is a strong, dry cold wind from the north (on the Mediterranean) or from the northwest (in lower Languedoc, Roussillon, Catalonia and the Balearic Islands). It is similar to the mistral in its causes and effects, but it follows a different corridor; the tramontane accelerates as it passes between the Pyrenees and the Massif Central, while the mistral flows down the Rhone Valley between the Alps and the Massif Central.

The tramontane is created by the difference of pressure between the cold air of a high pressure system over the Atlantic Ocean or northwest Europe and a low pressure system over the Gulf of Lion in the Mediterranean. The high-pressure air flows south, gathering speed as it moves downhill and is funnelled between the Pyrenees and the Massif Central.

According to French sources, the name was used in its present form at the end of the 13th century by Marco Polo, in 1298. It was borrowed from the Latin transmontanus and the Italian tramontana, meaning not just "across the mountains" but also "the North Star" (literally the star "above the mountains"), since the Alps marked the north for the Italic people. The French term tresmontaine, cited as early as 1209 and still used in the 15th century, was borrowed directly from the Latin.

The word moved from Latin into French with the meanings "North Star" and also "the guide". In 1636 the French expression "perdre la tramontane" meant "to be disorientated." (Note: It was used in this sense by Molière in his play Le Bourgeois Gentilhomme, where one character says "Je perds la tramontane" (I have lost my way). It was used the same way in the 20th century by the poet/songwriter Georges Brassens, who in his song "Je suis un voyou" wrote "J'ai perdu la tramontane en perdant Margot..." (I lost my guiding star when I lost Margot...))

The continuous howling noise of the tramontane is said to have a disturbing effect upon the psyche. In his poem "Gastibelza", Victor Hugo has the main character say, "Le vent qui vient à travers la montagne me rendra fou..." (The wind coming over the mountain will drive me mad...)

=== Greece ===
In Greece, tramountána (Greek: Τραμουντάνα) [tramuˈdana] is used as a nautical term to define not only the northern wind, but also the northern direction and even the cardinal point of north on a compass.

=== Italy ===
In Italy, it is called tramontana [tramonˈtaːna]. It is a northeasterly or northerly winter wind that blows from the Alps and Apennines (South of the Alps) to the Italian coast. It is very prevalent on the west coast of Italy and Northern Corsica. It is caused by a weather system from the west following a depression on the Mediterranean, due to the minimum baric level in the Ligurian Sea between Genoa and Corsica, which recalls strong winds. It is strongest before sunrise, when it can reach speeds of 70 km/h (45 mph). It is a fresh wind of the fine weather, mistral-type.

A clear sky can occur, or a cloudy sky and precipitation when associated with a perturbed system. This last case is called in Liguria "dark Tramontane" (Tramontana Scura), which in Liguria is activated following the invortication of the perturbations coming from the west (or even south-west or north-west) on the Ligurian Sea; for this reason a proverb in the Ligurian language states: "tramuntann-a scüa, ægua següa" ("dark north wind, sure rain").

In Italy the expression on board, "to lose the Tramontane" (perdere la tramontana), which meant losing one's orientation, then has passed into the common language with the same metaphorical meaning.

=== Slovenia ===
In Slovenia, the word tramontana [tɾamɔnˈtáːna] is used for a strong northerly, often hurricane-force wind that blows from the Alps to the Venice bay over Trieste, Slovenian coast and Istria, with gusts sometimes as high as 200 km/h (usually 80 km/h). It has a transitional nature (from 2 to 4 hours in Koper bay) and it often quickly turns to a bora. Due to its strength, it can uproot trees and often damages boats by crashing them into the coast.

== See also ==
- Winds of Provence
