= Insects (album) =

Studio album by Breed 77
- Released: 16 November 2009
- Genre: Alternative metal, flamenco music
- Length: 1:03:04
- Label: LaRocka Records

Breed 77 chronology
Un Encuentro (2007)	Insects (2009)

Insects is a 2009 album released by Gibraltarian flamenco/metal quintet Breed 77.

It was released on 16 November 2009 on LaRocka Records and contains 12 songs, including 2 bonus tracks. Breed 77 headlined a United Kingdom tour in support of the album in November 2009, titled "The Insects Are Here" tour. Support acts were Symphony Cult and Our Malevolent Tyranny. Cars on Fire also supported the band on some of the tour dates as well. In December 2009 the band are also touring in support of the album in Spain.

"The Battle of Hatin" was available as a free download from their website prior to the release of Insects.

Wake Up was the first single released from the album, and a music video, directed by Mario Ruiz has been produced. Zombie is to be released as a single around March 2010, and a music video has been produced.

The album was given an international re-release in May and June 2010, with Breed 77 signing a worldwide deal with earMusic / Edel GmbH. The re-released version of the album comes packaged in a digipak, with an extra bonus track 'Save Us', which also featured on the 'Wake Up' single. As well as this, the iTunes version of the earMusic release of the album features a previously unreleased track entitled 'Missing Me'.

== Track listing ==
1. "Wake Up" – 4:33
2. "The Battle of Hatin'" – 5:40
3. "Revolution on My Mind" – 4:25
4. "Insects" – 6:04
5. "Who I Am" – 5:15
6. "New Disease" – 4:19
7. "One More Time" – 4:02
8. "In the Temple of Ram: Rise of the Bugs" – 5:41
9. "Forever" – 4:38
10. "Guerra del Sol" – 6:22
11. "Zombie" (The Cranberries cover) – 5:30
12. "Insectos" (Spanish version of "Insects") (Bonus track) (Not featured on earMusic iTunes version) – 6:03
13. "Save Us" (Bonus Track) (Exclusive to earMusic CD version) – 6:08
14. "Missing Me" (Bonus Track) (Exclusive to earMusic iTunes version) – 3:47

== Critical reception ==
Professional ratings
Review scores
Source	Rating
Kerrang!	3/5 stars

"At a point in their career where many bands would consider desperate changes, Breed 77 have opted to stay on the same track for album number five, writing music specifically for their existing fan base," commented Kerrang critic Steve Beebee. "Not much of a challenge for anyone familiar with them, but still good stiff," he concluded, giving the album a 3 out of 5K's rating.
