= Winds of Provence =

Feature of the southeast French region

The winds of the Mediterranean

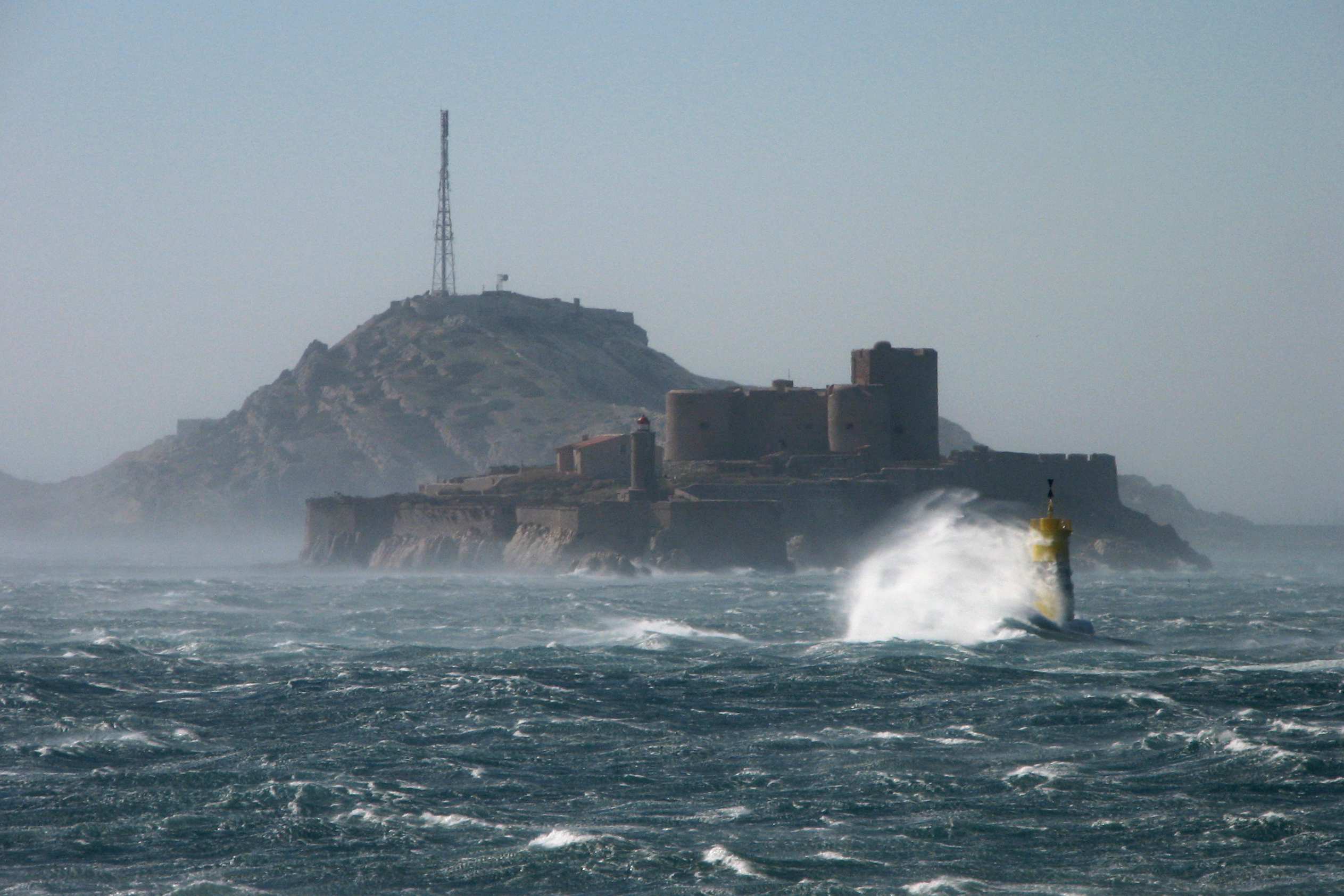
Mistral wind blowing near Marseille. In the center is the Chateau d'If.

The winds of Provence (Occitan: Vent de Provença), the region of southeast France along the Mediterranean from the Alps to the mouth of the Rhone River, are an important feature of Provençal life, and each one has a traditional local name, in the Provençal language.

The most famous Provençal winds are:

- the Mistral, a cold dry north or northwest wind, which blows down through the Rhone Valley to the Mediterranean, and can reach speeds of ninety kilometers an hour.
- the Levant, a very humid east wind, which brings moisture from the eastern Mediterranean.
- the Tramontane, a strong, cold and dry north wind, similar to the Mistral, which blows from the Massif Central mountains toward the Mediterranean to the west of the Rhone.
- the Marin, a strong, wet and cloudy south wind, which blows in from the Gulf of Lion.
- the Sirocco, a southeast wind coming from the Sahara desert in Africa, can reach hurricane force, and brings either reddish dust or heavy rains.

The Provençal names for the winds are very similar to the names in the closely related Catalan language:

- Tramontana (Pr.) = Tramuntana (Catalan)
- Levant (Pr.) = Llevant (Catalan)
- Mistral (Pr.) = Mestral (Catalan)

== Winds in Provençal culture ==
- The winds of Provence, particularly the Mistral, have long had an influence on the architecture of Provence. The mas traditionally faces southeast, with its back to the Mistral, and many Provençal churches have open iron grill bell towers, which allow the Mistral wind to pass through.
- The traditional Provençal Christmas creche often features one santon, or Provençal character, holding his hat and wearing a cape billowing from the Mistral.
- The Mistral also features in Provençal literature, and in the more recent novels of Marcel Pagnol.

== Names of the Winds of Provence (by points of the compass) ==
Traditional compass roses in Provence (see illustration, which shows Midi, or the South, at the top) have the names of the winds by the points of the compass.

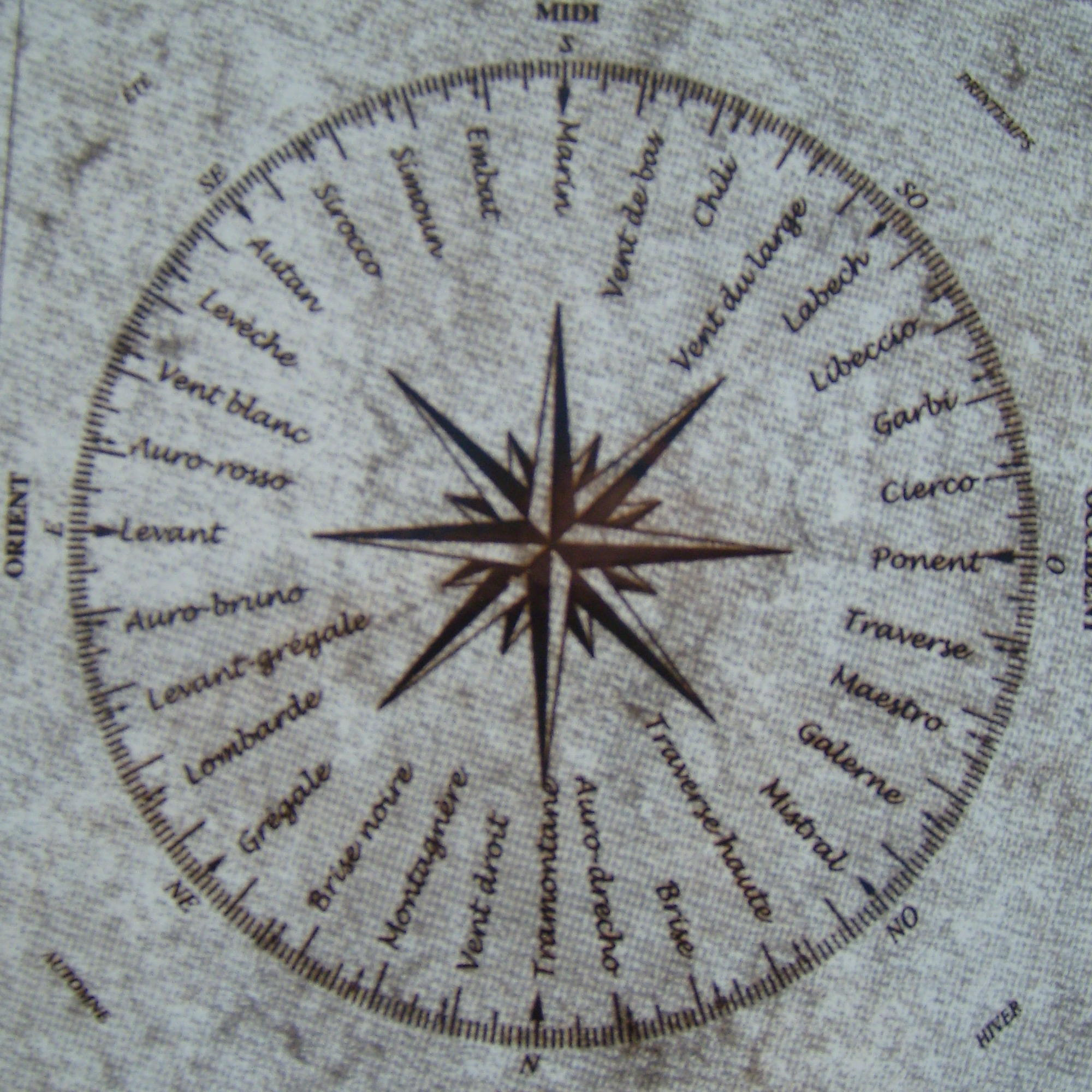
Compass rose of Provençal winds. South (Midi) is at the top.

- Tramontane (North wind)
- Vent droit
- Montagnére
- Brise Noire
- Burle
- Gregale (Northeast wind)
- Lombarde
- Levant-Grégale
- Auro-Bruno
- Levant (East wind)
- Auro-rosso
- Vent blanc
- Leveche
- Autan (Southeast wind)
- Sirocco
- Simoun
- Embat
- Marin (South wind)
- Vent de bas
- Chili
- Vent du Large
- Labech (Southwest wind)
- Libeccio
- Garbi
- Cierco
- Ponent (West wind)
- Traverse
- Maestro
- Galerne
- Mistral (Northwest wind)
- Traverse-haute
- Brise
- Auro-Drecho

== Bibliography ==
Jean Vialar, Les vents régionaux et locaux, 1948, réédité par Météo-France en 2003
