= Santon (figurine) =

Figurine in Provençal Nativity scenes

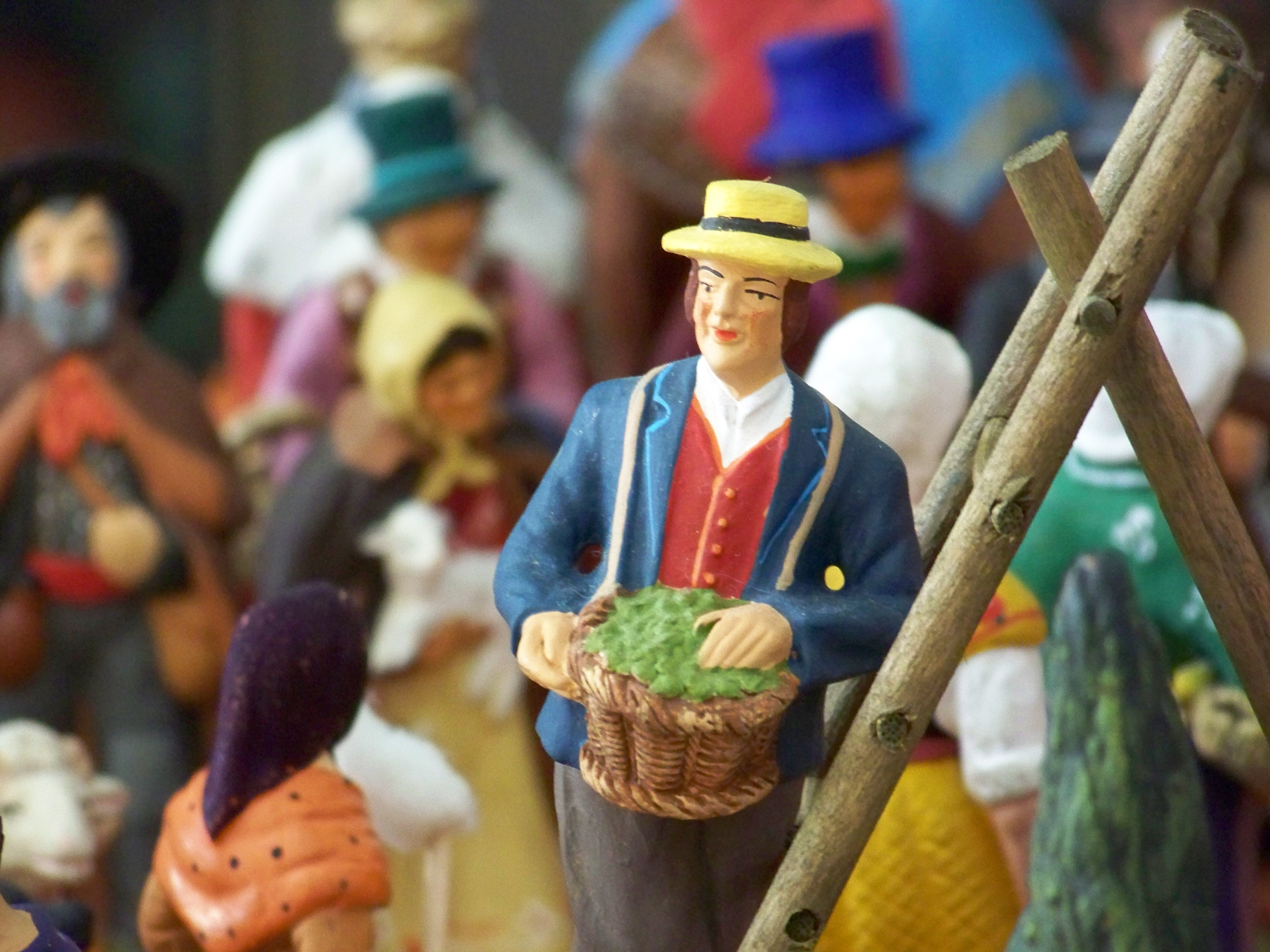
A santon figurine of a produce seller

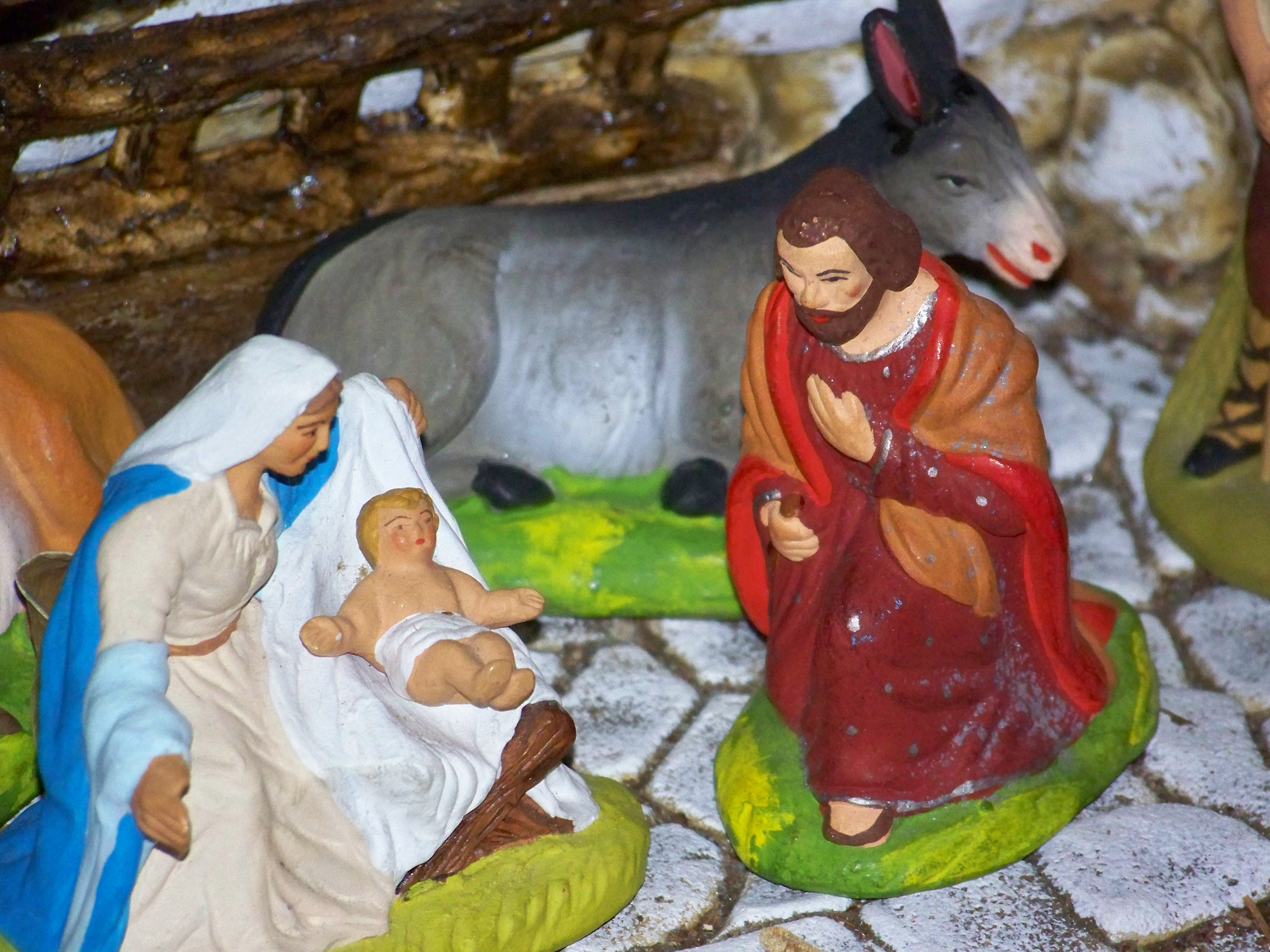
Nativity scene with santons

A santon is a small hand-painted figurine cast in terracotta or a similar material that is used for building nativity scenes. Santons are a traditional product of the Provence region of southeastern France. A maker of santons is called a santonnier.

The word "santon" comes from the Provençal "santoun," or "little saint." They became popular during the French Revolution, when the churches were closed and the larger, traditional nativity scenes in churches prohibited. Smaller figurines began appearing in homes, and quickly gained popularity.

The traditional manufacture of santons is centred on Marseille, Aix-en-Provence, Arles and Aubagne. In the month leading up to Christmas, there are traditional santon fairs all over Provence where santons of all sizes can be acquired to decorate domestic creches.

Apart from the standard figures and animals associated with the nativity (including elephants and camels), there are countless other santons depicting traditional characters from Provençal village life, including the motley fool, the miller and the blind man. Another common figure is a shepherd facing the mistral and the other winds of Provence, holding his hat, with his cloak blowing.
