= Solano (wind) =

The solano is an easterly to south-easterly wind, a regional variation or extension of the sirocco that refers to the relative position between the North African coast and southern Spain and not any of the other countries around the Mediterranean Sea. In the spring and summer, from June to September, it carries hot air, often with rain and sometimes with dust, from the African coast over the Strait of Gibraltar and the Andalusian plain, affecting cities such as Seville and Cádiz.

Its dampness was commonly thought to induce discomfort and exhaustion, to the point where the Spanish believed that one must "ask no favor during the solano" (because no one would want to help) and that only pigs and Englishmen are immune to its ill effects.
