= In My Blood (En Mi Sangre) =

Studio album by Breed 77
- Released: 11 September 2006
- Recorded: 2006
- Genre: Alternative metal, flamenco music, nu metal
- Length: 45:24
- Label: Albert Productions
- Producer: Ron Saint-Germain, Greg Havers, Danny Felice, Pedro Caparros López, and Paul Isola

Breed 77 chronology
| Cultura (2004) | In My Blood (En Mi Sangre) (2006) | Un Encuentro (2007) |

Singles from In My Blood
- 1. "Alive" Released: 12 June 2006; 2. "Blind" Released: 4 September 2006; 3. "Look at Me Now" Released: 23 April 2007

Professional ratings
Review scores
| Source | Rating |
|---|---|
| Get Ready To Rock | 4.5/5 stars |
| All Gigs | 4/5 stars |

In My Blood (En Mi Sangre) is the third studio album by Gibraltarian Flamenco metal quintet Breed 77. This album was produced by Ron Saint-Germain (The Saint) noted for his work with Soundgarden, Tool, Creed and Bad Brains. It was slated for release July 3, 2006, but was eventually released on September 11, 2006. In My Blood (En Mi Sangre) has produced three singles, these being "Alive", "Look at Me Now", and "Blind". It was recorded in Monnow Valley Studio and Albert's Studio in London.

== Release ==
The song "Blind" was exclusively released as a download exactly a week prior to the release of In My Blood (En Mi Sangre). It was one of Bruce Dickinson's top 5 singles of 2006.

== Track listing ==
All tracks written by Paul Isola, Danny Felice, Pedro Caparros López & Stuart Cavilla.

1. "Petróleo (You Will Be King)" – 3:56
2. "Empty Words" – 4:27
3. "Viento de Levante" – 0:50
4. "Blind" – 4:08
5. "Remember That Day" – 4:41
6. "Look at Me Now" – 4:30
7. "So You Know" – 4:47
8. "The Game" – 3:08
9. "Alive" – 3:31
10. "Libertad" – 5:58
11. "Tears" – 5:28
