= Cultura (Breed 77 album) =

Studio album by Breed 77
- Released: 3 May 2004
- Recorded: 2003–2004
- Genre: Alternative metal, flamenco music
- Length: 55:05
- Label: Albert Productions
- Producer: Paul Hoare, Danny Felice, Pedro Caparros López, Guillermo 'Will' Maya and Paul Isola

Breed 77 chronology
Breed 77 (2001)	Cultura (2004)	In My Blood (En Mi Sangre) (2006)

Singles from Cultura
- 1. "La Última Hora" Released: 20 November 2003; 2. "The River" Released: 26 April 2004; 3. "World's on Fire" Released: 12 July 2004

Professional ratings
Review scores
Source	Rating
Get Ready To Rock	4/5 stars
BBC	(8/10)

Cultura is the second studio album by Gibraltarian Flamenco Metal quintet Breed 77. It was released through J. Albert Productions on 3 May 2004. Three singles were released from this album, which were "La Última Hora", "The River" and "World's on Fire". The album features ten original songs and three remastered songs from their previous release. Cultura reached number 61 on the UK albums chart.

== Release ==
Breed 77 in the 2003 music video for La Última Hora.

The song "La Última Hora" was released on 20 November 2003: first as a CD EP in a card slip-case, and later released as a CD single and 7" Vinyl.

The second single, "The River", was released as a two-part CD and DVD set and on 7" vinyl. It reached number 39 on UK Top 40. The music video for this single was fully directed by Paul Isola. It was filmed at three different locations along the southern coast of the Iberian Peninsula. These included Río Tinto in Huelva, Tarifa in Cádiz (both in Spain) and finally Europa Point in Gibraltar. Río Tinto is a river which carries blood red waters due to its high mineral content, which provided the video with striking visuals. The famous sand dunes of Tarifa provides the video with a desert-like background, giving it a sense of scorching heat which is felt throughout the video. The Ibrahim-al-Ibrahim Mosque at Europa Point in Gibraltar can be clearly seen in the background as the band is seen playing their music and displaying a flag of Gibraltar as they do on stage at their concerts. This location holds a special meaning to the band as it is a place where they would hang out for hours during their teenage years.

The third single, "World's on Fire", was their first DVD release and just failed to hit the UK Top 40, securing a spot at number 43. However, it topped the official BBC Rock Chart at number 1. The CD single also featured the debut of a brand new song; "Tomorrow".

== Track listing ==
All tracks written by Paul Isola, Danny Felice, Pedro Caparros López & Stuart Cavilla.

1. "Voices" – 1:09
2. "Individuo" – 3:21
3. "La Última Hora" – 4:04
4. "A Matter of Time" – 4:22
5. "World's on Fire" – 3:57
6. "The River" – 5:15
7. "The Only Ones" – 3:49
8. "Resurrection" – 5:21
9. "Numb" – 4:02
10. "Calling Out" – 4:13
11. "Eyes That See '04" – 4:31
12. "Oración Final" - 5:58
13. "Breaking the Silence (Acoustic)" - 5:14
