= Breed 77 (album) =

Studio album by Breed 77
- Released: 1 December 2000; 4 April 2005 (re-release)
- Recorded: 2000
- Genre: Alternative metal; nu metal; flamenco
- Length: 53:41
- Label: Infernal Records
- Producer: Paul Hoare

Breed 77 chronology
Breed 77 (2000)	Cultura (2004)

Crucifix digi-pak (unfolded)

Breed 77 is the debut studio album by Gibraltarian flamenco metal band Breed 77. It was originally released in 2000 and re-released in 2005 due to popular demand. The album was also released as a limited edition in a crucifix-style fold-out digipak. In 2005 "Shadows" from this album was released as a single.

The single was released in three different formats: a double A-side CD featuring an acoustic version of "Breaking the Silence"; an enhanced CD including the video and remixes; and a double A-side vinyl which features a "Metal Mix" of both "Shadows" and "A Matter of Time" (Cultura). "Shadows" just failed to reach the UK Top 40 by a small margin, attaining only number 42.

== Track listing ==
All tracks in this album written by Breed 77 and produced, mixed and engineered by Paul Hoare.

1. "Shadows" – 3:09
2. "Rise" – 4:12
3. "Switch" – 3:38
4. "Breaking The Silence" – 5:09
5. "Karma" – 4:56
6. "Floods" – 5:51
7. "Final Prayer" – 5:59
8. "A Safe Place" – 3:49
9. "Fly" – 5:09
10. "Eyes That See" – 4:26
11. "Know That You Know" – 4:00
12. "The Hole" – 3:23
