= Breed 77 =

Gibraltarian rock band

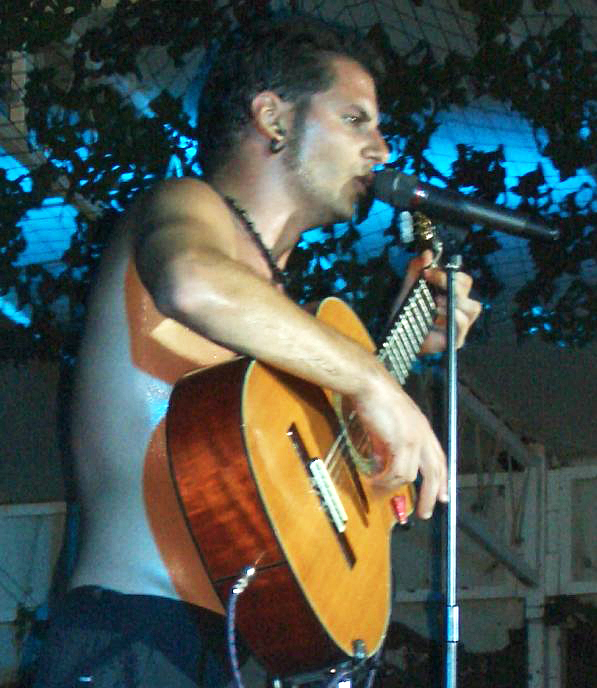
- Lead vocalist, Paul Isola

Background information
- Also known as: Breed
- Origin: Gibraltar
- Genres: Alternative metal; Nu metal; Flamenco rock
- Years active: 1996–2015, 2017, 2021-present
- Labels: Albert Productions (UK); Pagana Records (Spain); Flight Records (Japan); LaRocka Records (UK)
- Members: Paul Isola; Danny Felice; Pedro Caparros; Stuart Cavilla; Adam Stanley
- Past members: Rui Lopez; Andre Joyzi; Lawrence Bautista; Nick Beeslty; Gavin Hall; Ben Edis; Peter Chichone; Adam Lewis; Charlie Gomez; Dan Wilkinson; Oscar Preciado Zamora

Breed 77 (pronounced "Breed Seven-Seven") are a Gibraltarian rock band formed in 1996. Their music blended elements of alternative metal, flamenco, and other Latin influences, creating a distinctive sound. The band gained recognition in the early 2000s, releasing several albums and touring extensively. Known for their energetic live performances and their fusion of diverse musical styles, Breed 77 contributed to the nu metal and alternative rock scenes of the era. The band officially disbanded in 2015 but reformed in 2024.

== Origin ==
Breed 77 comes from the British overseas territory of Gibraltar. Old Gibraltarian school friends Paul Isola, Danny Felice, and Stuart Cavilla met up in London and became informally known as the Gibraltarian Mafia. When, in late April 1996, this circle of friends formed a band, they wanted a name to reflect their joint origins and called themselves simply Breed. The band were forced to change their name because it was previously registered by Steve Hewitt (formerly of Placebo) on his vanity record label. Stuart Cavilla, the band's bass player, had previously worked as a motorcycle courier under the call sign of Kilo 77 or K77, and the band became Breed 77.

== Awards ==
In 1998, Kerrang! readers voted Breed 77 the 'Best Unsigned Band'. In 1999, they won both the Metal Hammer and Kerrang! awards for the best new band. Then in 2001 they signed a five-album deal with Albert Productions, the renowned Australian publisher of AC/DC.

== Music releases ==
In November 2009, the band self-released their fifth studio album, Insects. This was followed by a re-release of the album in 2010 by German label EarMusic, and the release of a Spanish language version of the album in mainland Europe.

In March 2013, the band released its sixth studio album "The Evil Inside". through Frostbyte Records, following a successful PledgeMusic campaign and the release of 2012 acoustic EP Under The Skin. The first music video from the album, titled "Bring On the Rain", was released on the band's website on 6 March 2013.

The band headlined a UK tour in September 2010, joined by the Defiled and Transgression. The tour was called 'Infesting Britain'.

On 28 August 2013, lead vocalist Paul Isola announced his departure from the band due to personal circumstances, detailing that he would not be participating in the band's upcoming summer tour. He revealed that his replacement would be Rui Lopez, who would be completing the lineup for the four dates and joining the band thereafter.

== Members ==
=== Current lineup ===
- Paul Isola (Gibraltar) lead vocals, (1996–2013, 2014–2015, 2017, 2021-)
- Danny Felice (Gibraltar) – guitars, backing vocals (1996–2015, 2017, 2021-)
- Stuart Cavilla – bass (1996–1999, 2001–2014, 2017, 2024–)
- Pedro Caparros López (Barcelona, Spain) – guitars, backing vocals (2001–2015, 2017, 2021-)
- Adam Stanley - drums (2024–)

=== Former members ===
- Lawrence Bautista – drums (1996–1997)
- Nick Beesley – drums (1997–1998)
- Charlie Gomez – bass (1999–2000)
- Dan Wilkinson – bass (2000)
- Peter Chichone – drums and other percussion (1998–2006)
- Adam Lewis – drums and other percussion (2006–2007)
- Óscar Preciado Zamora – drums and other percussion (2007–2010, 2017 (one-off))
- Rui Lopez (Lisbon, Portugal) – lead vocals (2013–2014)
- Ben Edis (Nottingham, England) – bass (2014–2015)
- Andre Joyzi (Lisbon, Portugal) – drums and percussion (2010–2015)

== Discography ==
=== Studio albums ===
List of albums, with selected chart positions
Title	Album details	Peak chart positions			
Title	Album details	UK	UK Rock	UK Indie	SCO
Breed 77	Released: 1 December 2000 4 April 2005 (reissue); Label: Infernal Records (GB JAS UK 01); Formats: CD, DL	—	—	—	—
Cultura	Released: 3 May 2004; Label: Albert Productions (GB JAS UK 01); Formats: CD, DL	61	3	5	61
In My Blood (En Mi Sangre)	Released: 11 September 2006; Label: Albert Productions (JASCDUK031P); Formats: CD, DL	112	9	8	—
Un Encuentro	Released: 7 May 2007; Label: Albert Productions (JASCDUK039); Formats: CD, DL	—	29	34	—
Insects	Released: 16 November 2009; Label: LaRocka Records(LAROCCD002); Formats: CD, DL	—	27	31	—
The Evil Inside	Released: 25 March 2013; Label: FrostByte Media Inc.(FRB-CD-120); Formats: CD, DL	—	—	—	—

=== Singles ===
Title	Year	Peak chart positions				Album
Title	Year	UK	UK Rock	UK Indie	SCO	Album
"Karma"	2001	—	—	—	—	Breed 77
"La Ultima Hora"	2003	88	10	17	—	Cultura
"The River"	2004	39	—	6	45	Cultura
"World's on Fire"	2004	43	1	3	42	Cultura
"Shadows"	2005	42	3	13	47	Breed 77
"Alive"	2006	91	6	11	57	In My Blood (En Mi Sangre)
"Blind"	2006	—	—	—	—	In My Blood (En Mi Sangre)
"Look at Me Now"	2007	—	—	—	—	In My Blood (En Mi Sangre)
"El Mundo en Llamas"	2008	—	—	—	—	Un Encuentro
"El Rio"	2008	—	—	—	—	Un Encuentro
"Wake Up"	2009	—	—	—	—	Insects
"Zombie"	2009	—	—	—	—	Insects
"Drown"	2013	—	—	—	—	The Evil Inside
"Bring on the Rain"	2013	—	—	—	—	The Evil Inside
"—" denotes a recording that did not chart or was not released in that territory.

=== EPs ===
- The Message (1998)
- Vol. 1 (1999)
- La Última Hora (2003)
- Shadows (2005)
- Under the Skin (2012)

=== Music videos ===
- "Karma" (2001)
- "La Última Hora" (2003)
- "The River" (2004)
- "World's on Fire" (2005)
- "Shadows" (2005)
- "Blind" (2006)
- "El Mundo en Llamas" (2008)
- "El Rio" (2008)
- "Wake Up" (2009)
- "Zombie" (2010)
- "Bring On the Rain" (2013)
- "Fear" (2013)
- "A Matter Of Time (Acoustic)" (2021)
