= 2011 Sindh floods =

Floods in Pakistan

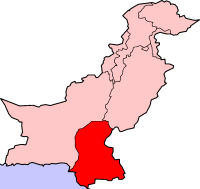
- Location of Sindh,
- Date: August 2011 – September 2011
- Location: Sindh, southern Balochistan, eastern Punjab and Azad Kashmir
- Deaths: At least 434 dead, 8.9 million affected
- Property damage: 8.9 million affected, 2.7 million children affected, 6.79 million acres land damaged, 1.52 million homes damaged

The 2011 Sindh floods was the highest-ever recorded rainfall between 11 August 2011, and 14 September 2011 in Sindh Province, Pakistan.

Heavy rainfall was the main cause of the 2011 Sindh floods. After 15 September 2011, water receded from the inundated area at the rate of 167 square kilometers a day. Unprecedented, torrential monsoon rains caused severe flooding in 16 districts of the Sindh province. The flooding followed the previous year's historic 2010 Pakistan floods, which devastated the entire country.

An estimated 434 civilians were killed while 5.3 million people and 1,524,773 homes were affected.

== Causes ==
In the month of July, Pakistan received below-normal monsoon rains. However, in August and September, the country received above-normal monsoon rains. A strong weather pattern entered Sindh and adjacent areas from the Indian states of Rajasthan and Gujarat in August. The strong weather gained strength and resulted in heavy downpours. The four weeks of continuous rain had created an unprecedented flood situation in Sindh.

The Badin district of the Sindh province received a record-breaking rainfall of 615.3 millimeters (24.22 in) during the monsoon spell exceeding the earlier record of 121 millimeters (4.8 in) dating back to 1936.

The area of Mithi also received a record rainfall of 1,290 millimeters (51 in) during the spell. The previous maximum rainfall there was recorded 114 millimeters (4.5 in) in 2004. The cloudburst causing incessant rain within a span of 72 hours displaced many people as well as destroying crops in the area.

The met office had informed the Provincial Disaster Management Authority, all district coordination officers, the offices of the chief minister and chief secretary about the heavy monsoon rain-spell two days earlier to allow them to take precautionary measures.

The flood was so severe that it inundated 3820.39 square kilometers in Badin, 1836.26 square kilometers in Mirpur Khas, 1352.32 square kilometers in Jacobabad, 1597.50 square kilometers in Shahdadkot, 1887.57 square kilometers in Dadu, and 2494.18 square kilometers in Sanghar. Furthermore, the above-mentioned districts comprised 61% of the total inundated areas spread over 23 districts of Sindh.

According to Qamar uz Zaman Chaudhry, director general of the Pakistan Meteorological Department,

"The rains in Sindh were the highest ever recorded monsoon rains during the four-week period between August and September 2011. Before the start of these rains in the second week of August, Sindh was under severe drought conditions and it had not received any rainfall in the preceding 12 months....The last severe rainfall flooding in Sindh occurred in July 2003... but this time the devastating rains in Mithi, Mirpur Khas, Diplo, Parker, Nawabshah, Badin, Chhor, Padidan, and Hyderabad during the four-week period have created unprecedented flood situation in Sindh."

According to Dr. Qamar, the total volume of water fallen over Sindh during the four weeks was estimated to be above 37 million acre-feet, "which is unimaginable". The August monsoon rainfall, over the province of Sindh (271% above normal) is the heaviest recorded during the period 1961–2011.

=== Torrential rainfall recorded in August and September in Sindh ===
The following table documents the heavy rainfalls recorded in Sindh province in the months of August and September 2011 based on the data from the Pakistan Meteorological Department. The first monsoon spell hit the southern parts of Sindh on 10 August. It produced record-breaking widespread torrential rainfalls and resulted in floods in the district of Badin. The second spell hit the areas on 30 August and lasted until 2 September.

In the month of September, four more consecutive spells of monsoon rainfall devastated the southern parts of the province. The first spell of September hit the already inundated parts of the province on 2 September. Thereafter, the second spell hit on 5 September, the third on 9 September, and the fourth on 12 September 2011. The four spells of monsoon produced even more devastating torrential rains in the already affected areas of Sindh.

City	August Rainfall (mm)	Rainfall (in)	September Rainfall (mm)	Rainfall (in)	Total Rainfall (mm)	Total Rainfall (in)	Notes	References
Mithi	530*	21.0	760*	30.0	1290*	51.0	^{[A]}	
Mirpur Khas	263.1*	10.3	603*	23.7	866.1*	34.1	^{[A]}	
Nawabshah	275.2*	10.8	353.2*	13.9	628.4*	24.7	^{[A]}	
Badin	331.2*	13.0	284.1	11.1	615.3*	24.2	^{[A]}	
Chhor	276	10.9	268	10.6	544*	21.4	^{[A]}	
Dadu	134.1	5.2	348.1	13.7	482.2*	18.9	^{[A]}	
Padidan	251.2	9.8	172	6.8	423.2*	16.6	^{[A]}	
Hyderabad	162.2	6.3	244.2	9.6	406.4	16.0		
Karachi	61.2	2.4	212.2	8.3	273.3	10.7		

* Indicates new record.

=== Heaviest spell of monsoon rains of 2011 in Sindh ===
The following table indicates the amount of rainfall recorded during the monsoon spell in Sindh province in the months of August and September 2011 based on data from the Pakistan Meteorological Department.

City	Rainfall (mm)	Rainfall (in)	Monsoon Spell	Notes
Mithi	760	30.0	1 to 14 September*	
Mirpur Khas	603	23.7	1 to 14 September	
Padidan	356	14.0	30 August to 4 September*	
Nawabshah	353.2	13.9	1 to 14 September	
Dadu	348.1	13.7	1 to 14 September	
Badin	302.1	11.8	10 to 14 August*	
Chhor	268	10.6	1 to 14 September	
Hyderabad	244.2	9.6	1 to 14 September	
Karachi	212.2	8.3	1 to 14 September	

- 1 to 14 September 2011, four consecutive spells of monsoon rains.
- 1 to 14 August 2011, first spell of monsoon rains in Sindh.
- 30 August to 4 September, second spell of monsoon rains in Sindh.

=== Flooding and impact ===
Millions of people were affected due to the heavy rains that started in August, coinciding with monsoon season. Villages become particularly affected.

The area of Sanghar was declared as the most dangerous region. In the aftermath of the monsoon rains, Oxfam warned that aid should be provided to Pakistanis or they will die. Approximately, 8,920,631 people were affected as a result of the floods and 433 people are said to have been killed.

Sindh is considered a fertile region and often called the "breadbasket" of the country due to its agricultural output. The impact of the 2011 flood on the local agrarian economy was substantial. At least 1.7 million acres of arable land was inundated as a result of the flooding.

== Protests by flood victims ==
As a result of the substantial flooding, some of the Pakistanis affected began protesting the government's response as slow and inadequate. Aid organisations reported that some ruling party politicians and officials are distributing aid only to their party supporters and people from their villages.

== Health concerns ==
=== Spread of disease ===
Gastroenteritis and malaria killed many infected people.

== Domestic reaction ==
A special wing of the ministry of the Government of Sindh has been created to deal with the flooding and its effects. The Chief Minister of Sindh, Qaim Ali Shah, has visited the effected areas, announcing a million rupees in relief for each flood victim. Various politicians also engaged in setting up relief camps for the victims. A helpline 0800-11-121 was set up for the victims.

The Pakistani Army and Navy actively engaged in flood relief and victim support. According to aid organisation Save the Children, the flooding is more disastrous than that during the 2004 tsunami.

== International reactions to the floods ==
- United Nations - the UN engaged in assisting the flood victims by the help of its agencies. $10 million are announced by UNICEF. It has said to feed 500,000 victims of flood, especially those part of the country in the Badin district.
- China - China announced $4.7 million aid for the flood victims.
- Iran - Iran announced $10 million aid for the flood victims.
- United States - The U.S. embassy in Islamabad helped the affected areas and flood victims with multiple types of aid.
- Japan - The Japanese Government provided 35 million yen in aid for flood victims.

== See also ==
- List of floods in Pakistan
- 2011 Kohistan floods
- 2010 Pakistan floods
- List of extreme weather records in Pakistan

== Notes ==
A. Indicates new record. Record-breaking torrential monsoon rains in Sindh.
