= List of natural disasters in Pakistan =

The following is a list of natural disasters that have affected Pakistan.

Event	Disaster	Location	Date	Affected	Death Toll
	Earthquake/Tsunami	Makran	325 BC		
1935 Quetta earthquake	Earthquake	Quetta	May 31, 1935		60,000
1945 Balochistan earthquake	Earthquake/Tsunami	Makran	Nov 27, 1945		4,000
	Flood		1950		2,900
	Wind storm	Karachi	Dec 15, 1965		10,000
	Flood		Aug 1973	4,800,000	
1974 Hunza earthquake	Earthquake	Northern Areas	Dec 28, 1974	97,000	5,300
	Flood		Aug 2, 1976	5,566,000	
	Flood		Jun 1977	1,022,000	848
	Flood		Jul 1978	2,246,000	
	Flood		Aug 1988	1,000,000	
	Extreme Temperature		Jun 11, 1991		961
	Flood		Aug 9, 1992	6,184,418	
	Flood		Sep 1992	12,324,024	1,334
	Wind storm		Nov 14, 1993		609
	Flood		Jul 22, 1995	1,255,000	
	Flood		Aug 24, 1996	1,186,131	
	Flood		Mar 3, 1998		1,000
	Drought		Mar 2000	2,200,000	
2005 Kashmir earthquake	Earthquake	Muzaffarabad	Oct 8, 2005	2,500,000	87,351
2010 Pakistan floods	Flood		Jul/Aug 2010	20,000,000	

== See also ==
- National Disaster Management Authority (Pakistan)
- List of extreme weather records in Pakistan
- List of tropical cyclones in Pakistan
- List of earthquakes in Pakistan
- Climate change in Pakistan
- List of floods in Pakistan
- Drought in Pakistan
