= List of extreme weather records in Pakistan =

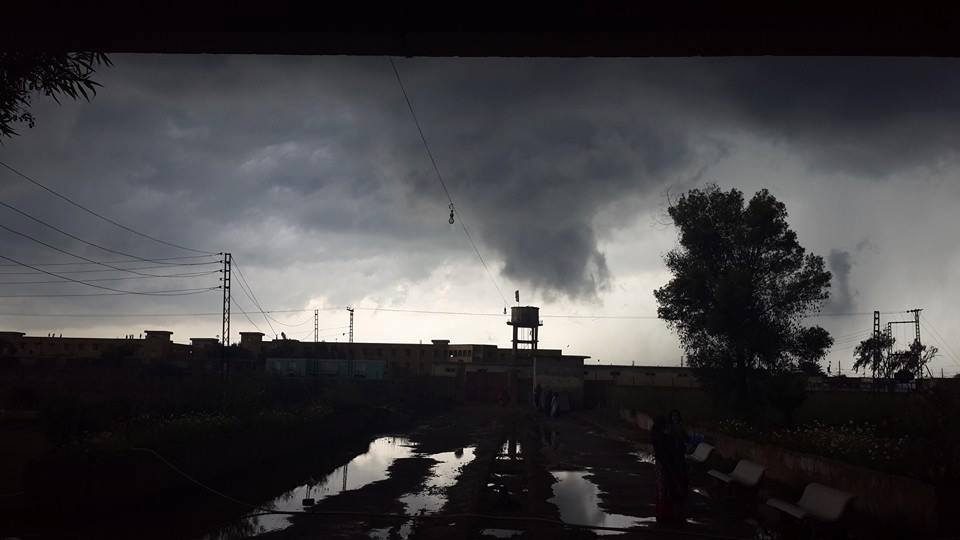
Supercell thunderstorm in Larkana on 14 March 2015

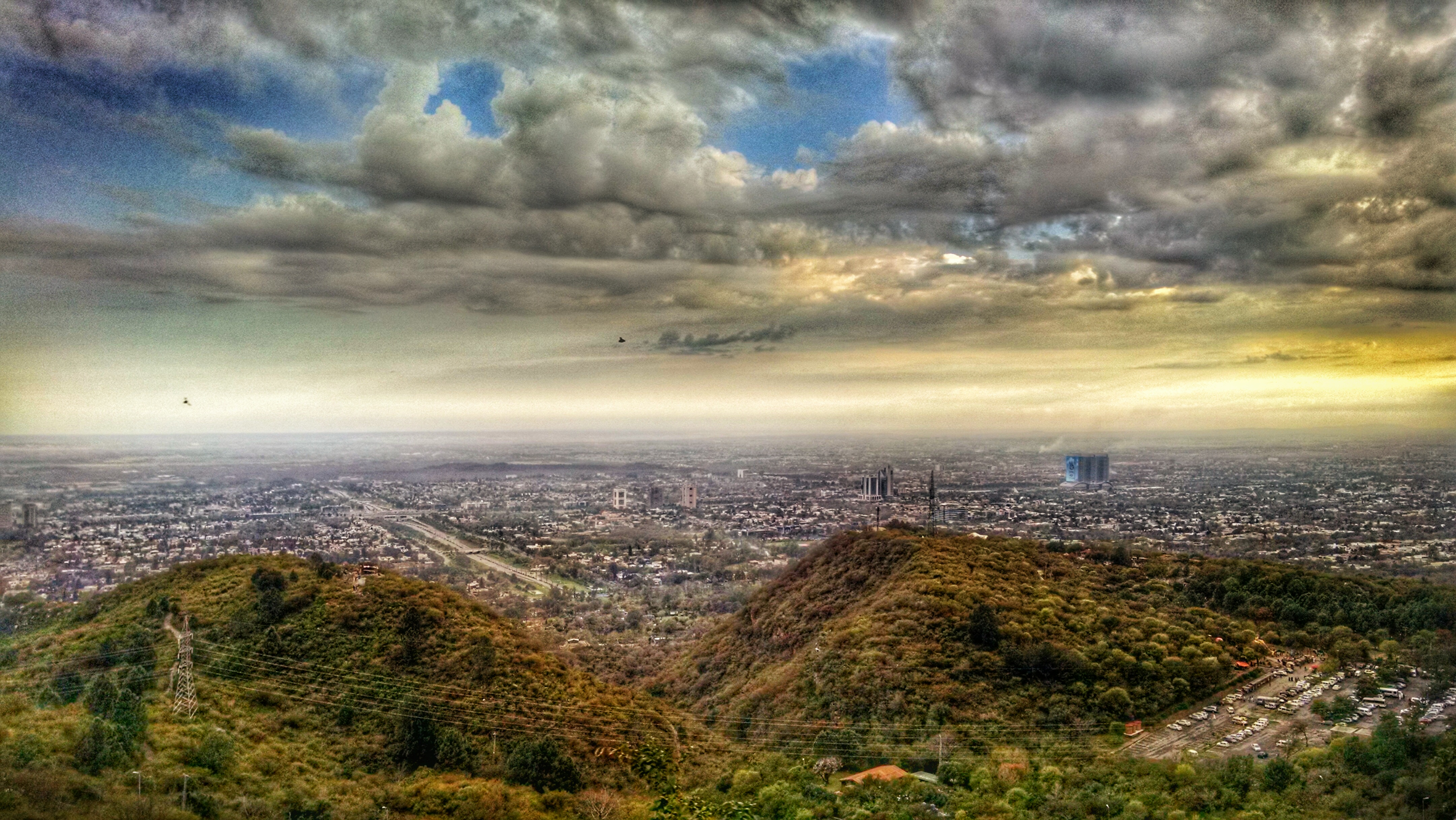
Islamabad under dark clouds

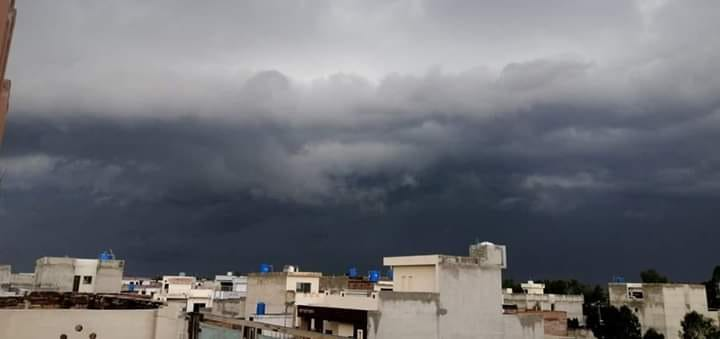
Supercell thunderstorm in Faisalabad on 13th March 2020

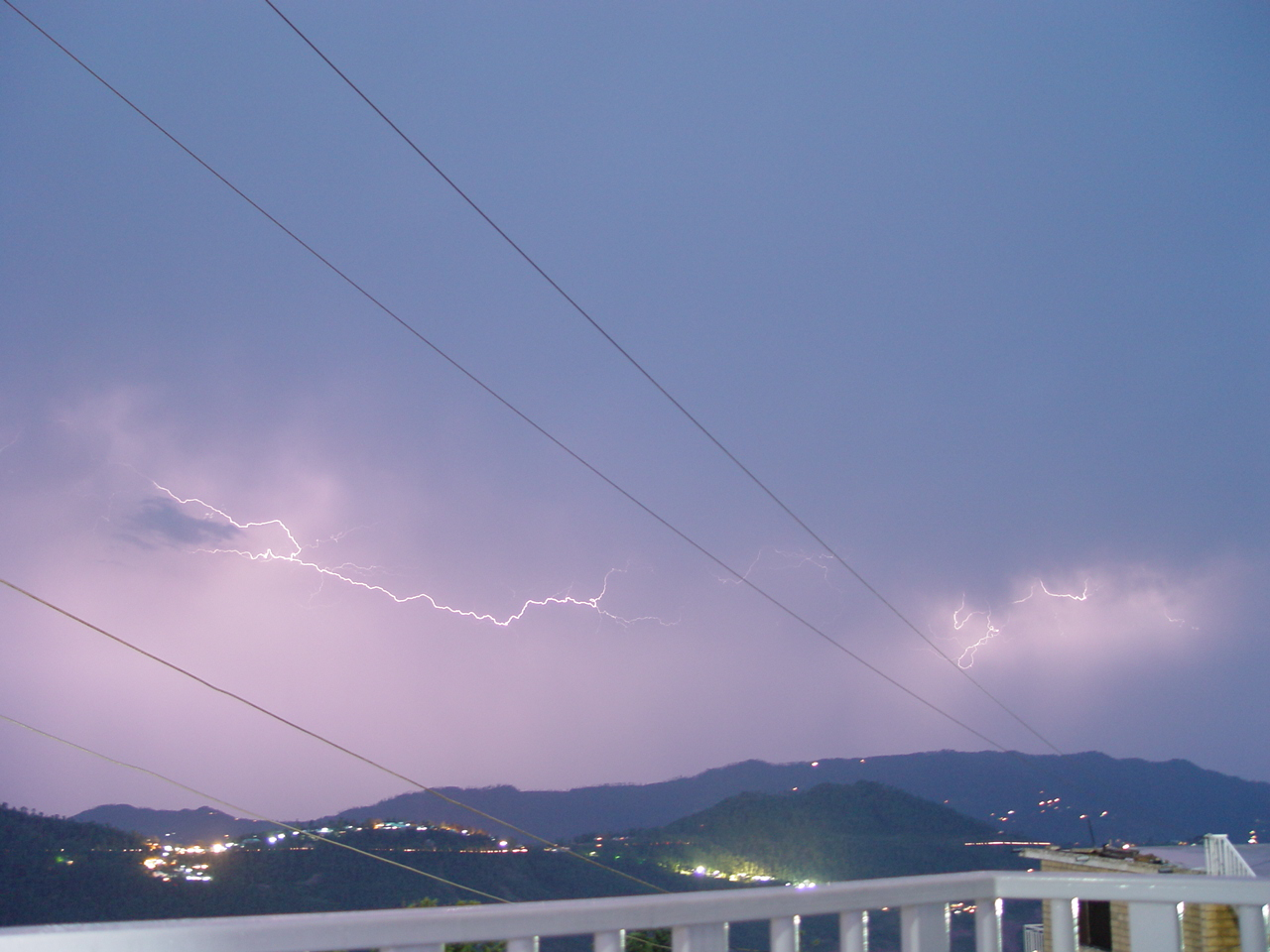
Lightning in Murree during the monsoon of 2005

Extreme weather in Pakistan includes everything from heavy rainfall and flooding to extremely low or extremely high temperatures. Pakistan has one of the highest temperature ranges in the world (temperature range refers to the difference between the highest and lowest recorded temperatures of a certain area). Temperatures can range from as high as those in the Sahara Desert, to as low as those in Alaska, making it one of the most climatically diverse countries in the world. The highest temperature that has ever been recorded in Pakistan is 53.8 °C (128.8 °F), which was recorded in Turbat, Balochistan, and Moenjo Daro, Sindh, on 28 May 2017 and 26 May 2010 respectively. It was not only the hottest temperature ever to be recorded in Pakistan, but it was also the hottest reliably measured temperature that has ever been recorded on the continent of Asia, and it was the fourth-highest temperature that has ever been recorded on Earth. On 23 July 2001, a rainfall of 620 millimetres (24 in) was recorded in Islamabad; the rain fell in just 10 hours.

== Temperature ==
Temperature is measured, as standard, at 1.2 meters above ground, and out of direct sunlight (hence the term x degrees "in the shade").

== High temperatures ==
In Pakistan, heat waves can occur at any time between April and September; the most powerful ones occur in May and June. Areas of southern Pakistan often experience temperatures above 50 °C (122 °F). The most deadly heat wave in Pakistan's history was the record-breaking heat wave of May 2010. Heat spreads throughout the north-central part of the country, including the Punjab and KPK.

=== List of cities with temperature of 50 °C or above ===
This list is based on data from the Pakistan Meteorological Department, 1931–2022, along with other sources.

Date	Temperature °C	City	Province	Notes	References
	28 May 2017	53.7 °C (129.2 °F)	Turbat	Balochistan	The World Meteorological Organization (WMO) has officially evaluated temperature record extremes of 53.7 °C (128.7 °F) in Turbat, Pakistan, on 28 May 2017.
22 July 1985	53 °C (127.4 °F)	Nokkundi	Balochistan	A temperature of 53 °C (127.4 °F) was reportedly recorded in Nokkundi, Balochistan, Pakistan, on 22 July 1985.	
26 May 2010	53.5 °C (129.2 °F)	Mohenjo-Daro	Sindh		
26 May 2010	53 °C (127 °F)^{[A]}	Larkana	Sindh	This was the fifth-highest temperature that has ever been recorded on Earth and the second-hottest reliably-measured temperature to be recorded on the continent of Asia. Larkana has been Pakistan's hottest city since 2010. 50 °C (122 °F) or above was recorded on four consecutive days from 24 to 27 May 2010.	
26 May 2010	53 °C (127 °F)^{[A]}	Sibi	Balochistan	50 °C (122 °F) or above was recorded on five consecutive days between 22 and 26 May 2010. Previously, 52.6 °C (126.7 °F) was recorded on June 5, 2003.	
12 June 1919	52.8 °C (127.0 °F)	Jacobabad	Sindh		
31 May 1998	52.7 °C (126.9 °F)^{[A]}	Larkana	Sindh	This was the highest recorded temperature in 1998.	
26 May 2010	52.5 °C (126.5 °F)^{[A]}	Padidan	Sindh	50 °C (122 °F) or above was recorded on three consecutive days from 24 to 26 May 2010.	
19 May 2016	52.2 °C (126.0 °F)^{[A]}	Larkana	Sindh	It was the highest recorded temperature in Pakistan in 2016. 50 °C (122 °F) or above was recorded for four consecutive days from 17 to 20 May 2016.	
30 May 2009	52 °C (126 °F)	Turbat	Balochistan	50 °C (122 °F) or above was recorded for five consecutive days from 26 to 29 May 2009.	
26 May 2010	52 °C (126 °F)^{[A]}	Nawabshah	Sindh	50 °C (122 °F) or above was recorded for five consecutive days from 22 to 26 May 2010.	
19 May 2013	51.5 °C (124.7 °F)	Larkana	Sindh		
22 May 2010	51.3 °C (124.3 °F)	Larkana	Sindh		
9 June 2007	51 °C (124 °F)	Bhakkar	Punjab	50 °C (122 °F) or above was recorded for two consecutive days on the 9 and 10 June 2007.	
1 June 1996	51 °C (124 °F)	Rohri	Sindh		
28 May 2010	51 °C (124 °F)^{[A]}	Dadu	Sindh	50 °C (122 °F) was recorded for two days, 26 and 27 May 2010.	
26 May 2010	51 °C (124 °F)^{[A]}	Noorpurthal	Punjab	50 °C (122 °F) was recorded on May 19, 2011.	
25 May 2010	51 °C (124 °F)^{[A]}	Sukkur	Sindh	50 °C (122 °F) or above was recorded for three consecutive days, 25 to 27 May 2010.	
10 June 2007	51 °C (124 °F)	Sargodha	Punjab	50 °C (122 °F) was recorded for 2 days, 9 and 10 June 2007.	
15 May 2009	50 °C (122 °F)	Lasbella	Balochistan	50 °C (122 °F) was recorded for 2 days, 15 and 16 May 2009. 50 °C (122 °F) was also recorded on May 21, 2011.	
27 May 2010	50 °C (122 °F)^{[A]}	Multan	Punjab	Record temperature in city; previous highest was 49 °C (120 °F) in 1956.	
26 May 2010	50 °C (122 °F)^{[A]}	Bahawalnagar	Punjab		
20 May 2011	50 °C (122 °F)	Pasni	Balochistan		
20 June 1986	50 °C (122 °F)^{[A]}	Dera Ghazi Khan	Punjab	50 °C (122 °F) or above was recorded for three consecutive days from 20 June 1986.	
5 June 1978	50 °C (122 °F)	Dera Ismail Khan	Khyber Pakhtunkhwa		
10 June 2007	50 °C (122 °F)	Bannu	Khyber Pakhtunkhwa	50 °C (122 °F) or above was recorded for two days, 9 and 10 June 2007.	

=== List of cities with temperature of 45 °C or above but below 50 °C ===
This list is based on data from the Pakistan Meteorological Department, 1931–2020, and other sources.

Date	Temperature °C	City	Province	Notes
20 April 2017	49.0 °C (120.2 °F)	Sukkur	Sindh	This was a record breaking temperature for the month of April.

== Record breaking heat wave of April 2017 ==
A severe heat wave with temperatures as high as 50 °C (122 °F) hit Pakistan, especially its southern areas, in April 2017. This heat wave broke the old temperature records of many cities in the country for the month of April. Larkana, Sindh, experienced the highest maximum temperature of 50 °C (122 °F) on 19 April and broke its old record of 48.5 °C (119.3 °F), which was recorded in April 2000. Other cities of the country also broke their old records of highest maximum temperatures in the month of April.

=== Recorded temperatures ===
Extreme temperatures started to affect these parts of the country from mid-April and peaked on 19–20 April.

Place	Temperature	Date
Larkana	50.0 °C (122.0 °F)	19 April
Sukkur	49.0 °C (120.2 °F)	19 April
Mohenjo Daro	48.5 °C (119.3 °F)	19 & 20 April
Dadu	48.5 °C (119.3 °F)	20 April
Jacobabad	48.0 °C (118.4 °F)	20 April
Nawabshah	48.0 °C (118.4 °F)	20 April
Sibi	48.0 °C (118.4 °F)	19 & 20 April
Karachi	48.0 °C (118.4 °F)	22 & 23 April

== Record breaking 2010 summer heat wave ==
The hottest temperature ever to be recorded in Asia, and the fourth highest temperature that has ever been recorded in the world, was recorded in Mohenjo-daro, Sindh, at 53.5 °C (128.3 °F). The second hottest temperature ever to be recorded in Asia and the fifth highest temperature ever to be recorded in the world was in Larkana, Sindh at 53 °C (127 °F) on May 26, 2010. Twelve cities in Pakistan saw temperatures that went above 50 °C (122 °F) during the extreme summer heatwave of 2010, which lasted from May 22 to May 31 of that year. On May 27, temperatures higher than 45 °C (113 °F) hit areas across Pakistan and at least 18 people died as a result. In addition, during the extreme heatwave season, eleven cities saw their highest-ever recorded temperatures of 50 °C (122 °F) or above, and five cities saw temperatures of 53 °C (127 °F). Eleven cities also saw extreme temperatures of more than 45 °C (113 °F), although they were below 50 °C (122 °F). The previous highest temperature ever recorded for Pakistan and for Asia was on June 12, 1919, at 52.8 °C (127.0 °F); this occurred at Jacobabad.

== Low temperatures ==
In northern and western Pakistan, cold waves can occur between October and March. The most powerful cold waves usually occur in December and January. During these cold waves, some areas of northern and western Pakistan often experience temperatures that are below 0 °C. Often, the place most affected by these cold waves is the glacial parts of Gilgit Baltistan, where, in winter, the average temperature remains below -20 °C. The K2 Peak has recorded a wind chill of -65 °C. The most deadly cold wave in the recent history of Pakistan was the record-breaking cold wave of winter 2020. Temperatures in the hottest places of Pakistan fell below 2 °C or more. Cities that are near the foothills of the Himalayas, including Islamabad, Peshawar, and Lahore, can record temperatures that are below freezing. It is not uncommon for Islamabad to receive snow in strong cold spells; the Khyber Hills, in Peshawar, Hayatabad can also receive light snowfall.

=== List of some important cities of Pakistan with temperature of 0°C or below Official data (according to Pakistan Metrological Department) ===
Date	Temperature °C	City	Province	References
7 January 1995	-24 °C. (-11.2 °F)	Skardu	Gilgit-Baltistan	
???	-23.9 °C (-11.0 °F)	Naran (town)	Khyber Pakhtunkhwa	
8 January 1970	-18.3 °C (-0.9 °F)	Quetta	Balochistan	
20 January 1978	−17 °C (1 °F)	Kalat	Balochistan	
5 February 1984	-13.9 °C (7.0 °F)	Dir	Khyber Pakhtunkhwa	
11 January 1987	-13.5 °C (7.7 °F)	Gilgit	Gilgit Baltistan	
29 December 1972	-12.2 °C (10.0 °F)	Chitral	Khyber Pakhtunkhwa	
????	-11 °C (12 °F)	Murree	Punjab	
30 December 1997	-11 °C (12 °F)	Dalbandin	Balochistan	
26 January 2008	-11 °C (12 °F)	Drosh	Khyber Pakhtunkhwa	
9 February 1974	-10 °C (14 °F)	Nok Kundi	Balochistan	
30 December 1977	-10 °C (14 °F)	Barkhan	Balochistan	
23 January 1982	-7.3 °C (18.9 °F)	Kakul	Khyber Pakhtunkhwa	
17 January 1967	−6.0 °C (21.2 °F)	Islamabad	Islamabad Capital Territory	
6 January 2006	−5.4 °C (22.3 °F)	Mohenjo Daro	Sindh	
11 December 1996	−4.1 °C (24.6 °F)	Faisalabad	Punjab	
17 January 1967	-3.9 °C (25.0 °F)	Rawalpindi	Punjab	
11 January 1967	-3.9 °C (25.0 °F)	Multan	Punjab	
27 January 2008	-3 °C (27 °F)	Saidu Sharif	Khyber Pakhtunkhwa	
1 February 1929	-3 °C (27 °F)	Sialkot	Punjab	
15 January 1935	-3 °C (27 °F)	Bahawalpur	Punjab	
17 January 1935	-2 °C (28 °F)	Lahore	Punjab	
10 January 1983	-1.6 °C (29.1 °F)	Peshawar	Khyber Pakhtunkhwa	
6 January 2006	−1.0 °C (30.2 °F)	Larkana	Sindh	

== Precipitation ==
The standard instrument for measuring rain or snowfall is the rain gauge.

== Rainfall ==
Pakistan receives rainfall from both monsoons and western disturbances. The Monsoon season occurs from July to September and brings a heavy downpour across the country, except in western Balochistan. Western disturbances occur from October to May and bring rainfall across the country, with some heavy downpour in northern Pakistan. In June, however, western disturbances occasionally hit the northern parts of the country. Occasionally, pre-monsoon weather can also occur in this month.

=== Heaviest rainfall in a single season ===
Record-breaking rainfall in Pakistan that occurred over a single season. This table is based on data from the Pakistan Meteorological Department, 1931–2022 and other sources.

Season	Rainfall (mm)	Rainfall (in)	City	Province	Notes
July–August 2022	1,763.9	69.4	Padidan	Sindh	1,763.9 millimetres (69.44 in) of rainfall was recorded from 01.07.2022 to 26.08.2022 in Padidan. This was a result of a consistent low pressure area that occurred over northern Sindh. It was the heaviest rainfall in Sindh that has ever been recorded.

=== Heaviest rainfall of 400 mm or above during a 24 hour period ===
Record-breaking rainfall that occurred in Pakistan, which reached over 400 millimetres (16 in) or above during a 24-hour period. This table is based on data from the Pakistan Meteorological Department, 1931–2016, along with other sources.

Date	Rainfall (mm)	Rainfall (in)	City	Province	Notes
23 July 2001	620	24.4	Islamabad	Islamabad Capital Territory	620 millimetres (24 in) of rainfall was recorded in a period of 10 hours, on 23 July 2001. This occurred in Islamabad as the result of a cloudburst. It was the heaviest rainfall in Islamabad and also the heaviest recorded in Pakistan.
3 September 2025	557	21.9	Gujrat, Pakistan	Punjab	Heaviest rainfall ever recorded in Punjab Province.
16 July 2025	423	16.6	Chakwal	Punjab	Due to cloud burst

=== Rainfall between 200 mm and 400 mm during a 24 hour period ===
Record-breaking rainfall that occurred in Pakistan, recorded to be between 200 millimetres (7.9 in) and 400 millimetres (16 in), during a 24-hour period. This is based on data from the Pakistan Meteorological Department, 1931–2020, along with other sources.

Date	Rainfall (mm)	Rainfall (in)	City	Province	Notes	References
26 August 2025	365	14.3	Sialkot	Punjab	Heaviest rainfall ever recorded in Sialkot.	
19 August 2022	355	14.0	Padidan	Sindh	Record-breaking rainfall, which occurred due to a well marked low pressure area	
11 August 2011	350	13.8	Tando Ghulam Ali	Sindh		
23 July 2001	335	13.2	Rawalpindi (Shamsabad)	Punjab	Record-breaking rainfall in Rawalpindi, which occurred due to a cloudburst.	
7 September 2011	312	12.3	Diplo	Sindh	Record-breaking rainfall in Diplo.	
10 September 2012	305	12.0	Jacobabad	Sindh	Heaviest 24 hours rainfall while 441 mm rainfall in 36 hours in the month of September.	
5 September 2014	300	11.8	Lahore	Punjab	Heaviest rainfall to ever occur in the month of September during a 24-hour period.	
5 September 2014	297	11.7	Islamabad	Islamabad Capital Territory	Heaviest rainfall to ever occur in the month of September during a 24-hour period.	
5 September 2014	296	11.7	Jhelum	Punjab	Heaviest rainfall to ever occur in the month of September during a 24-hour period.	
10 August 2011	291	11.5	Mithi	Sindh	Record-breaking rainfall in Mithi.	
29 July 2010	280	11.0	Risalpur	Khyber Pakhtunkhwa		
7 August 1953	278.1	10.9	Karachi (Manora)	Sindh		
29 July 2010	274	10.8	Peshawar	Khyber Pakhtunkhwa	Record-breaking rainfall in Peshawar; the previous record was 187 millimetres (7.4 in) mm, which was recorded on 10 April 2009.	
5 September 1961	264.2	10.4	Faisalabad	Punjab		
30 July 2010	257	10.1	Islamabad	Islamabad Capital Territory		
29 July 2010	257	10.1	Cherat	Khyber Pakhtunkhwa		
2 July 1972	256.5	10.1	Nawabshah	Sindh		
10 September 1992	255	10.0	Murree	Punjab		
5 September 2014	251	9.9	Mangla	Punjab		
5 September 2014	251	9.9	Sialkot	Punjab		
12 September 1962	250.7	9.9	Hyderabad	Sindh		
5 September 2014	243	9.6	Islamabad	Islamabad Capital Territory		
2 September 2020	240	9.4	Bahawalnagar	Punjab		
26 August 2011	240	9.4	Kohat	Khyber Pakhtunkhwa		
31 August 2011	238	9.4	Padidan	Sindh		
5 September 2014	234	9.2	Rawalakot	Azad Kashmir		
27 August 1997	233.8	9.2	Murree	Punjab		
29 July 2010	233	9.1	Kohat	Khyber Pakhtunkhwa		
30 July 2010	231	9.1	Murree	Punjab		
6 June 2010	227	8.9	Gwadar	Balochistan	Record-breaking rainfall in Gwadar.	
7 September 2011	225	8.9	Mithi	Sindh		
13 August 2008	221	8.7	Lahore	Punjab		
20 July 2013	217	8.5	Islamabad	Islamabad Capital Territory		
1 August 1976	211	8.3	Lahore	Punjab		
7 July 2003	209	8.2	Larkana	Sindh	Record-breaking rainfall in a span of 24 hours.	
10 September 1992	208	8.2	Muzaffarabad	Azad Kashmir		
1 July 1977	207.6	8.2	Karachi	Sindh		
29 July 2007	205	8.1	Sargodha	Punjab		
18 July 2009	205	8.1	Karachi (Masroor)	Sindh		
4 August 2010	202	8.0	Dera Ismail Khan	Khyber Pakhtunkhwa	Record-breaking rainfall in Dera Ismail Khan; the previous record was 116 millimetres (4.6 in), which was recorded on 4 July 1994.	
11 August 2011	200	7.9	Tando Mohammad Khan	Sindh		
11 August 2011	200	7.9	Tando Ghulam Haider	Sindh		
24 July 2001	200	7.9	Islamabad	Islamabad Capital Territory		
27 August 1997	200	7.9	Islamabad	Islamabad Capital Territory		

== Record-breaking heavy rainfall of August 2022 in Sindh ==
In early July, 2022, when the monsoon began, week long periods of rainfall were already affecting Sindh. A low pressure area had developed over the Bay of Bengal, which became a depression, before it hit northern Sindh on 18 August. The depression became stationary over the northern areas of the province, and caused unprecedented, record-breaking rainfall in places such as Larkana, Naushahro Feroze, Kambar Shahdadkot, Khairpur, Jacobabad, Dadu, Nawabshah, Shikarpur until 22 August. Another low pressure area hit the same part of the province on 25 August, and caused levels of rainfall that stretched from heavy to very heavy.

=== Heavy rainfall recorded during the month of August 2022 in Sindh ===
Heavy rainfall of more than 200 millimetres (7.9 in) that was recorded during the month of August 2022, in the province of Sindh, but particularly in northern Sindh. This information is based on data from the Pakistan Meteorological Department.

City	Rainfall (mm)	Rainfall (in)
Padidan	1228.5	48.4
Moenjo Daro	779.5	30.7
Larkana	762.3	30.0
Sakrand	617	24.3
Khairpur Mir's	606.3	23.8
Tando Jam	603	23.7
Chhor	547.9	21.6
Jacobabad	498.7	19.6
Nawabshah	495.7	19.5
Sukkur	379	14.9
Rohri	371.4	14.6
Dadu	337	13.3
Badin	307.5	12.1
Mirpur Khas	304	12.0
Mithi	273	10.7
Hyderabad	243	9.6
Thatta	208.8	8.2

== Record-breaking heavy Rainfall of September 2014 ==
In the first week of September, 2014, an August-like monsoonal period hit the country. This occurred when a very low air pressure system (29") was formed over Kashmir; this then moved eastward into Northern Pakistan. The spell caused torrential rainfall on the first five days of September. This resulted in devastation to life and property. As the last two days of the spell were extremely wet, the River Chenab, Jhelum, Ravi, Sutlej and Indus burst their banks.

=== Heavy rainfall recorded during the wet spell of September 2014 ===
Rainfall exceeding 200 millimetres (7.9 in) that was recorded during the wet spell of September 1 to 5, 2014, in northern Pakistan. This information is based on data from the Pakistan Meteorological Department.

City	Stations	Rainfall (mm)	Rainfall (in)	Province	Notes
Lahore	Shahi Qila	557	21.9	Punjab	Record-breaking rainfall for the month.
Lahore	Misri Shah	539	21.2	Punjab	
Lahore	Shahdra	538	21.2	Punjab	
Sialkot	Cantt (city)	523	20.6	Punjab	
Lahore	Airport	518	20.4	Punjab	
Rawalakot		507	20.0	Azad Kashmir	
Sialkot	Airport	439	17.3	Punjab	
Lahore	Jail Road	437	17.2	Punjab	
Kotli		431	17.0	Azad Kashmir	
Lahore	Upper Mall	421	16.6	Punjab	
Rawalpindi	Chaklala (Old Islamabad Airport)	345	13.6	Punjab	Record-breaking rainfall for the month.
Mangla		345	13.6	Azad Kashmir	
Gujranwala		336	13.2	Punjab	
Islamabad	Zero Point	331	13.0	Islamabad Capital Territory	
Rawalpindi	Shamsabad	319	12.6	Punjab	
Gujrat		310	12.0	Punjab	
Islamabad	Saidpur	298	11.7	Islamabad Capital Territory	
Okara		293	11.5	Punjab	
Dina		284	11.2	Punjab	
Murree		262	10.3	Punjab	
Faisalabad		228	9.0	Punjab	
Rawalpindi	Bokra	222	8.7	Punjab	
Jhelum		220	8.7	Punjab	
Islamabad	Golra Sharif	211	8.3	Islamabad Capital Territory	

== Record-breaking heavy rainfall of September 2012 in Sindh ==
After severe drought conditions, which occurred in Sindh during the months of July and August, 2012, an intense low-pressure area developed in the Bay of Bengal. This occurred in late August. The low-pressure area moved towards Sindh, causing torrential rains in Upper Sindh. The highest rainfall to be recorded was in Jacobabad, with a record 481 millimetres (18.9 in) in just 7 days, and 441 millimetres (17.4 in) in just 36 hours. In Larkana, 239 millimetres (9.4 in) of rainfall was recorded; 206 millimetres (8.1 in) of rainfall was recorded in Sukkur. Larkana was the worst affected by heavy rainfall.

=== Heavy rainfall recorded during the wet spell of September 2012 in Sindh ===
Heavy rainfall of more than 200 millimetres (7.9 in) that was recorded during the wet spell of September 5 to 11, 2012, in the province of Sindh, but particularly in Upper Sindh. This information is based on data from the Pakistan Meteorological Department.

City	Rainfall (mm)	Rainfall (in)	Monsoon spell	Notes
Jacobabad	481	18.9	September 5 to 11	Record-breaking rainfall for the month; 441 mm in just 36 hours.
Larkana	216	8.5	September 5 to 11	Record-breaking rainfall for the month of September.
Sukkur	206	8.1	September 5 to 11	Record-breaking rainfall for the month of September.
Rohri	205	8.0	September 5 to 11	Record-breaking rainfall for the month of September.

== Record-breaking torrential rainfall of August and September 2011 in Sindh ==
Heavy clouds over Larkana, during the wet spell of September 2011

In the month of July, Pakistan received unusually low monsoon rainfall; however, in August and September, the country received unusually high monsoon rainfall. A strong weather pattern entered Sindh from the Indian states of Rajasthan and Gujarat, in August. It gained strength over time and caused a heavy downpour. The first monsoon spell hit the southern parts of Sindh on 10 August. It produced record breaking, widespread, torrential rainfall, and caused floodig in the district of Badin. The second spell hit on 30 August and lasted until 2 September. In the month of September, four more consecutive spells of monsoon rainfall devastated the southern parts of the province. The first spell of September hit the already inundated parts of the province, on 2 September. Thereafter, the second spell hit on 5 September, the third on 9 September, and the fourth on 12 September 2011. The four spells of monsoon rainfall produced even more devastating torrential rains in the already affected areas of Sindh.

=== Heavy rainfall recorded during the wet spells of August and September 2011 in Sindh ===
Rainfall of exceeding 200 millimetres (7.9 in) that was recorded in the heaviest monsoon spell, in different areas of Sindh province, during the months of August and September, 2011. This table is based on data from the Pakistan Meteorological Department.

City	Rainfall (mm)	Rainfall (in)	Monsoon Spell	Notes
Mithi	760	30.0	September 1 to 14	Record-breaking rainfall in Mithi.
Mirpur Khas	603	23.7	September 1 to 14	Record-breaking rainfall in Mirpur Khas.
Padidan	356	14.0	August 30 to September 4	Record-breaking rainfall in Padidan.
Nawabshah	353.2	13.9	September 1 to 14	Record-breaking rainfall in Nawabshah.
Dadu	348.1	13.7	September 1 to 14	Record-breaking rainfall in Dadu.
Badin	302.1	11.8	August 10 to 14	Record-breaking rainfall in Badin.
Chhor	268	10.6	September 1 to 14	Record-breaking rainfall in Chhor.
Hyderabad	244.2	9.6	September 1 to 14	
Karachi	212.2	8.3	September 1 to 14	

- September 1 to 14, 2011: four consecutive spells of monsoon rains in Sindh.
- August 1 to 14, 2011: first spell of monsoon rains in Sindh.
- August 30 to September 4: second spell of monsoon rains in Sindh.

== Record-breaking heavy rainfall of July 2010 ==
Unprecedented heavy monsoon rains began, in the last week of July 2010, in the Khyber Pakhtunkhwa, Punjab, Gilgit-Baltistan and Azad Kashmir regions of Pakistan, which caused floods in Balochistan and Sindh. The floods that were caused by these monsoon rains, and were forecast to continue into early August, were described as the worst in the last 80 years. The Pakistan Meteorological Department said that over 200 millimetres (7.9 in) of rain fell over a 24-hour period, in a number of places in Khyber Pakhtunkhwa and Punjab, and that more was expected. A record-breaking 274 millimetres (10.8 in) of rain fell in Peshawar in 24 hours; previously 187 millimetres (7.4 in) of rain was recorded in April 2009. Other record-breaking rains were recorded in Risalpur, Cherat, Saidu Sharif, Mianwali, and Kohat regions of Khyber Pakhtunkhwa.

=== Heavy rainfall recorded during the wet spell of July 2010 ===
Heavy rainfall exceeding 200 millimetres (7.9 in) that was recorded during the four-day wet spell of July 27 to 30, 2010, in the provinces of Khyber Pakhtunkhwa and Punjab. This table is based on data from the Pakistan Meteorological Department.

City	Rainfall (mm)	Rainfall (in)	Monsoon spell	Province
Risalpur	415^{[B]}	16.3	July 27 to 30	Khyber Pakhtunkhwa
Islamabad	394	15.5	July 27 to 30	Islamabad Capital Territory
Murree	373	14.6	July 27 to 30	Punjab
Cherat	372^{[B]}	14.6	July 27 to 30	Khyber Pakhtunkhwa
Garhi Dopatta	346	13.6	July 27 to 30	Azad Kashmir
Saidu Sharif	338^{[B]}	13.3	July 27 to 30	Khyber Pakhtunkhwa
Peshawar	333^{[B]}	13.1	July 27 to 30	Khyber Pakhtunkhwa
Kamra	308	12.1	July 27 to 30	Punjab
Rawalakot	297	11.7	July 27 to 30	Azad Kashmir
Muzaffarabad	292	11.5	July 27 to 30	Azad Kashmir
Lahore	288	11.3	July 27 to 30	Punjab
Mianwali	271^{[B]}	10.6	July 27 to 30	Punjab
Lower Dir	263	10.3	July 27 to 30	Khyber Pakhtunkhwa
Kohat	262^{[B]}	10.3	July 27 to 30	Khyber Pakhtunkhwa
Balakot	256	10.0	July 27 to 30	Khyber Pakhtunkhwa
Sialkot	255	10.0	July 27 to 30	Punjab
Pattan	242	9.5	July 27 to 30	Azad Kashmir
Dir	231	9.1	July 27 to 30	Khyber Pakhtunkhwa
Gujranwala	222	8.7	July 27 to 30	Punjab
Dera Ismail Khan	220	8.6	July 27 to 30	Khyber Pakhtunkhwa
Rawalpindi	219	8.6	July 27 to 30	Punjab

== Snowfall ==
Pakistan receives snowfall from western disturbances. Between the months of November and February, western disturbances bring snowfall to the more mountainous or hilly areas of Pakistan; the heaviest snowfall occurs in those areas that are farther north, where blizzards are common. In February 2017, at least 14 people were killed and 9 were injured by an avalanche in the Sher Shall area of Chitral district.

=== Heaviest snowfall of 40" or above during 24 hours ===
Record-breaking snowfall in Pakistan that exceeded 40 inches (100 cm), during a 24-hour period. This is based on data from the Pakistan Meteorological Department, 1931–2020, along with other sources.

Date	Snowfall (in)	Snowfall (cm)	City or Station	Province	References
4 February 2013	42	107	Malam Jabba	Khyber Pakhtunkhwa	

=== Heaviest snowfall of 20" or above but below 40" during 24 hours ===
Record-breaking snowfall in Pakistan that exceeded 20 inches (51 cm) but did not exceed 40 inches (100 cm), during a 24-hour period. This information is based on data from the Pakistan Meteorological Department, 1931–2020, along with other sources.

Date	Snowfall (in)	Snowfall (cm)	City or Station	Province	References
4 February 2013	24	60.96	Kalam	Khyber Pakhtunkhwa	

== Wind ==
Date	City	Wind speed (km/h)	Wind speed (mph)	Notes	References
9 June 2005	Multan	205	126	Duststorm	
28 March 2001	Bhalwal, Sargodha	193	121	Tornado reported	
12 June 1962	Rawalpindi	177	110		
13 October 2006	Rawalpindi	176	110	Tornado reported	
2 June 2000	Faisalabad	151	94		

== Floods ==
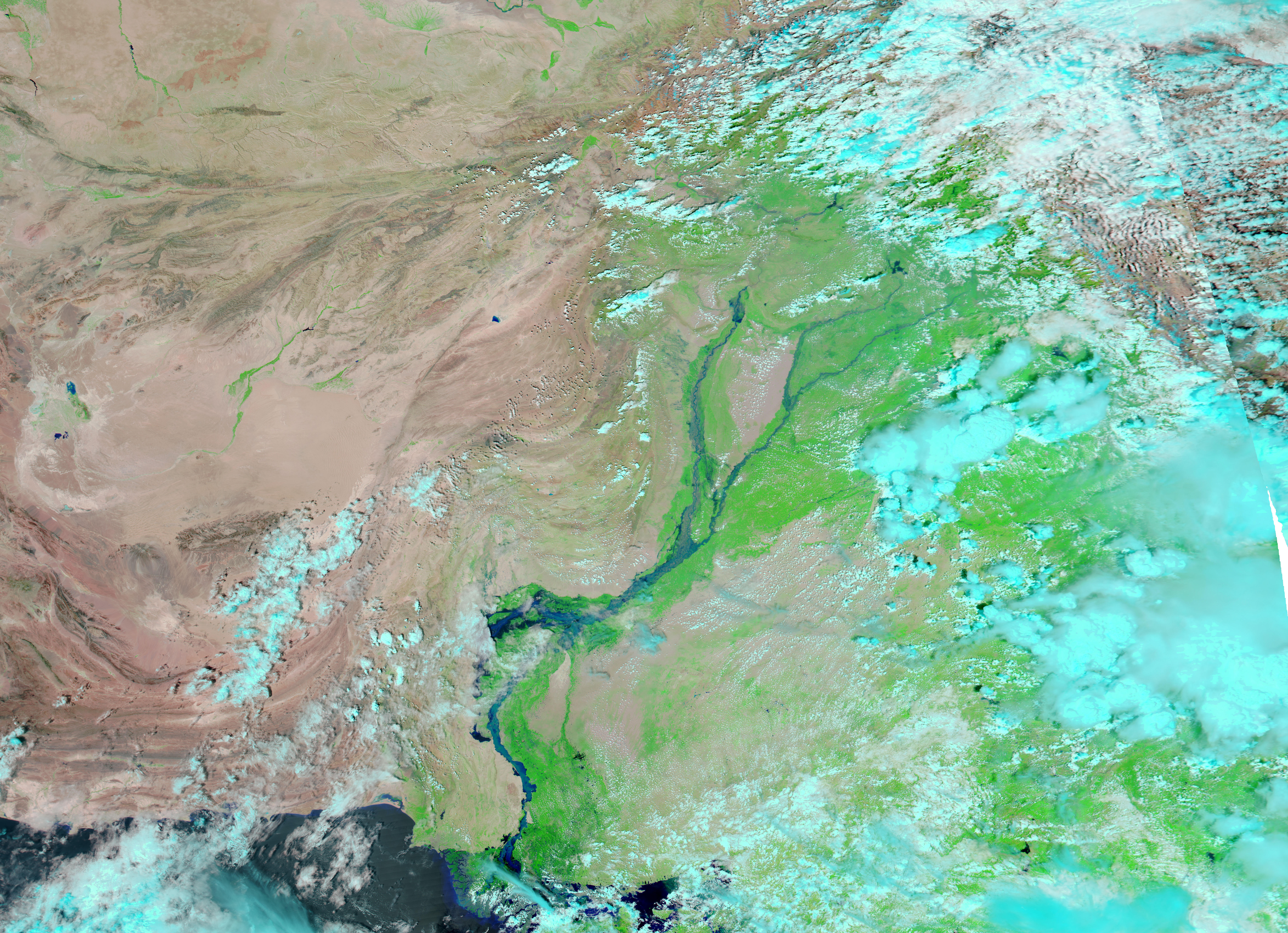
A NASA satellite image showing the Indus River at the time of 2010 floods

Pakistan has seen many floods. The worst, and most destructive, flooding was the recent 2010 Pakistan floods, which swept away 20% of Pakistan's land. The flood was the result of unprecedented monsoon rains, which lasted from 28 July to 31 July 2010. Khyber Pakhtunkhwa and North eastern Punjab were badly affected during the monsoon rains, when dams, rivers and lakes overflowed. By mid-August, according to the governmental Federal Flood Commission (FFC), due to the flooding, at least 1,540 people had died; 2,088 people had received injuries; 557,226 houses had been destroyed; and over 6 million people had been displaced. One month later, the data had been updated to reveal 1,781 deaths, 2,966 people with injuries, and more than 1.89 million homes destroyed. The flood affected more than 20 million people, and exceeded the combined total of the individuals who were affected by the 2004 Indian Ocean tsunami, the 2005 Kashmir earthquake, and the 2010 Haiti earthquake. This flood is considered the worst in Pakistan's history, as it affected people of all four provinces, including Gilgit Baltistan and Azad Kashmir. The climate in Pakistan is very unpredictable and extreme, due to its geographical location, and the geography of the country itself, which includes both tropical plains and the world's highest peaks. Monsoon season can be harsh, due to Pakistan's close proximity with the monsoon areas of India, Bangladesh, Thailand, and Myanmar. Floods in the mountainous regions of the country, which cover about 70% of Pakistani land, can experience very dangerous landfalls and avalanches, and the glaciers in the most distant and remote parts of the countries can bring danger to nearby villages.

The 2011 Sindh floods began during the monsoon season in mid-August 2011, resulting from heavy monsoon rains in Sindh, eastern Balochistan, and southern Punjab. These floods have caused considerable damage: an estimated 270 civilians were killed, and 5.3 million people – as well as 1.2 million homes – were affected. Sindh is a fertile region, and is often called the "breadbasket" of the country; the damage and toll of the floods on the local agrarian economy is said to be extensive. At least 1.7 million acres of arable land has been inundated as a result of the flooding. The flooding has been described as the worst since the 2010 Pakistan floods, which devastated the entire country. Unprecedented torrential monsoon rains caused severe flooding in 16 districts of Sindh province.

Other floods that have caused destruction in Pakistan include the flood of 1950, which killed 2,910 people; the flood of 1977, which killed 248 people, in Karachi (according to Pakistan Meteorological Department, 207 millimetres (8.1 in) of rain fell within 24 hours); the flood of 1992, which killed 1,834 people; the flood of 1993, which killed 3,083 people across South Asia, of which fifteen were in Pakistan; the flood of 2003, which killed 178 people; and the flood of 2007, when Cyclone Yemyin submerged lower part of Balochistan Province in sea water, killing 380 people (before that, Cyclone Yemyin killed 213 people in Karachi).

=== July 2025 Monsoon Floods ===
In late June 2025, nearly a week of relentless monsoon rains and flash floods wreaked havoc across Pakistan, claiming at least 46 lives and injuring dozens more. The deluge, described by officials as abnormally intense, caused fatalities in Khyber Pakhtunkhwa (22), Punjab (13), Sindh (7), and Balochistan (4), according to the National Disaster Management Authority.

From the hills of Swat to the lowlands of Sindh, citizens struggled against rising waters, collapsed homes, and washed-away roads. “We are expecting above-normal rains during the monsoon season,” warned Irfan Virk, a senior official of the Meteorological Department, who also raised concerns about the risk of a repeat of the catastrophic 2022 floods.

Despite early warnings, thousands remain vulnerable due to inadequate infrastructure, poor urban planning, and delayed emergency responses. The tragedy reflects a grim reality for many Pakistanis — extreme weather events are becoming deadlier, while the state response remains insufficient to protect the lives and dignity of its citizens.

== See also ==
- 2010 Pakistan floods
- 2011 Sindh floods
- 2014 India–Pakistan floods
- 2015 Pakistan heat wave
- Climate of Pakistan
- Drought in Pakistan
- List of floods in Pakistan
- List of weather records
- Tropical cyclones and tornadoes in Pakistan

== Notes ==
A. Indicates new record. Record-breaking extreme heat wave observed in the plain areas of Punjab, Sindh and Balochistan where 50 °C (122 °F) or more was observed in 12 cities between 22 and 27 May 2010. Previous extreme heat wave conditions were observed in 1998, 2002 and 2007.
B. Indicates new record. Record-breaking monsoon rains observed during the month of July, 2010 in northeastern Punjab, Khyber Pakhtunkhwa, and Azad Kashmir.
