= List of tropical cyclones in Pakistan =

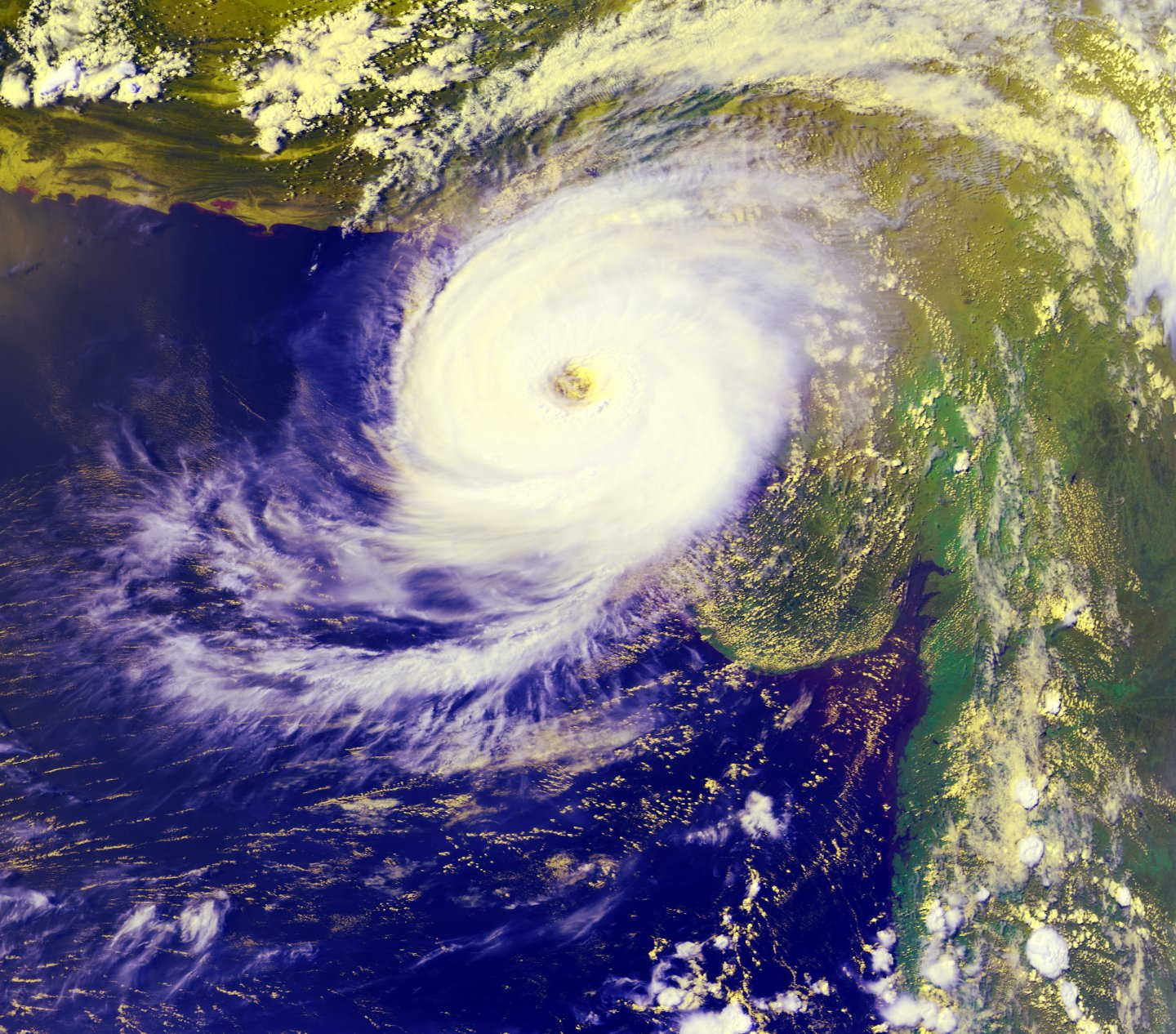
Cyclone 2A making landfall near Karachi at peak intensity as Category 3 equivalent hurricane in May 1999

Pakistan lies in the temperate zone. The climate is generally arid, characterized by the extreme southwestern part of the country where Gwadar and Karachi are the main port cities. Though cyclones are rare in the Arabian sea, cyclones that form in this sea mostly move towards Western India rather than Pakistan. Cyclones in the Arabian sea form mostly from May till June and then from September till October, monsoon season plays a vital role for the formation of cyclone in this basin. Tropical storms that hit Pakistan are mostly remnants by the time reach Pakistan or make landfall in south eastern Sindh which is not very much populated they rarely move towards the Balochistan coast.

== Background ==
Pakistan has a 1,046-kilometre (650 mi) coastline along the Arabian Sea and the Gulf of Oman in the extreme south western part of the country where Gwadar is the main port city. Though cyclones are rare in the Arabian sea which is a part of North Indian Ocean, cyclones that form in this sea mostly move towards Western India rather than Pakistan. Cyclones in the Arabian sea form mostly from May till June and then from September till October, monsoon season plays a vital role for the formation of cyclone in this basin.

Each year before the onset of monsoon that is 15 April to 15 July and also after its withdrawal that is 15 September to 15 December, there is always a distinct possibility of the cyclonic storm to develop in the north Arabian Sea. There is a 98 per cent chance of cyclones to turn towards the Indian state of Gujarat, one per cent chance of moving towards the Gulf and one per cent chance of moving towards the Pakistani coast.

There is only one tropical cyclone warning centre in Pakistan, which is in Karachi in Sindh province.

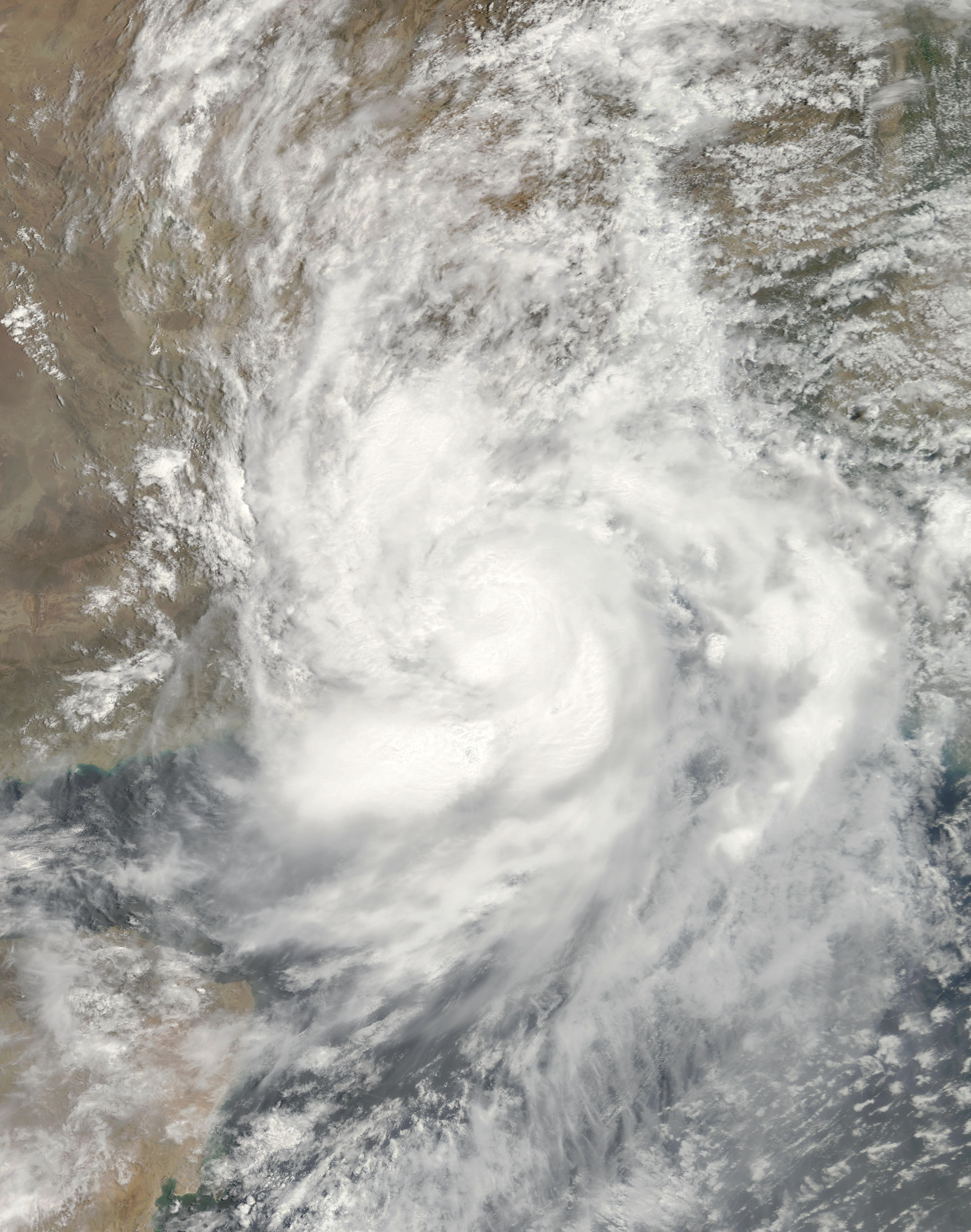
Cyclone Yemyin making landfall in Balochistan province on 26 June 2007

Cyclones mostly hit the Sindh coast than the Balochistan coast in Pakistan. During the last 125 years a number of cyclonic storms have struck Pakistan's coastal areas. The years involved were 1895, 1902, 1907, 1944, 1948, 1964, 1985, 1999, 2007 and 2010. Other cyclones that are listed below caused rains as remnants.

== Systems ==
=== Pre-1900 ===
- 10 July 1894 – A land depression moved westward through India, entering current-day Pakistan at Sindh.
- 18 June 1895 – A cyclonic storm hit the Makran coast in Balochistan province.

=== 1900–1949 ===
- 3 May 1901 – Originating off the southwest coast of India, a cyclone passed near Oman before making landfall along Balochistan. The storm moved through the country and dissipated on 5 May.
- 13 May 1902 – A cyclonic storm struck the coast in the vicinity of Karachi.
- 21 June 1906 – After moving across India, a storm crossed into Pakistan.
- June 1907 – A tropical storm struck the coast near Karachi.
- 3 September 1926 – A storm moved from Gujarat into Pakistan.
- 30 June 1936 – A storm moved from India into Pakistan.
- 2 July 1936 – A tropical cyclone moved through southeastern Pakistan.
- 15 July 1936 – A depression moved off the coast of Pakistan.
- 27 July 1944 – A cyclone left some 10,000 people homeless in Karachi.
- 8 June 1948 – Moving ashore near Pasni along the Makran, a storm brought rainfall to Balochistan and Sindh.

=== 1950–1999 ===
- 12 June 1964 – A cyclone made landfall in Tharparkar and Hyderabad district in Sindh province. It killed 450 people and left some 400,000 people homeless.
- 1970 Bhola Cyclone hit East Pakistan killing thousands.
- May 1985 – A cyclonic storm made a landfall in the eastern direction of Karachi. The cyclonic storm in 1985 which was moving towards Karachi actually had weakened over the sea while still a few 100 Kilometers away south of Karachi.
- 16 November 1993 – A cyclone dissipated near the Sindh-Gujarat border. However it caused massive rainfall and flooding in Karachi but Thatta and Badin districts were the worst affected where the cyclone killed 609 people and displaced some 200,000 others.
- 9 June 1998 – Striking Gujarat in neighboring India, a cyclone electrocuted 12 people in Pakistan.
- 20 May 1999 – The strongest cyclone to hit Pakistan moved ashore near Keti Bandar at Category 3 intensity on the Saffir–Simpson scale. It killed 6,200 people in the country. At least $1 million in relief funds was to be supplied by the government.

=== 2000–present ===
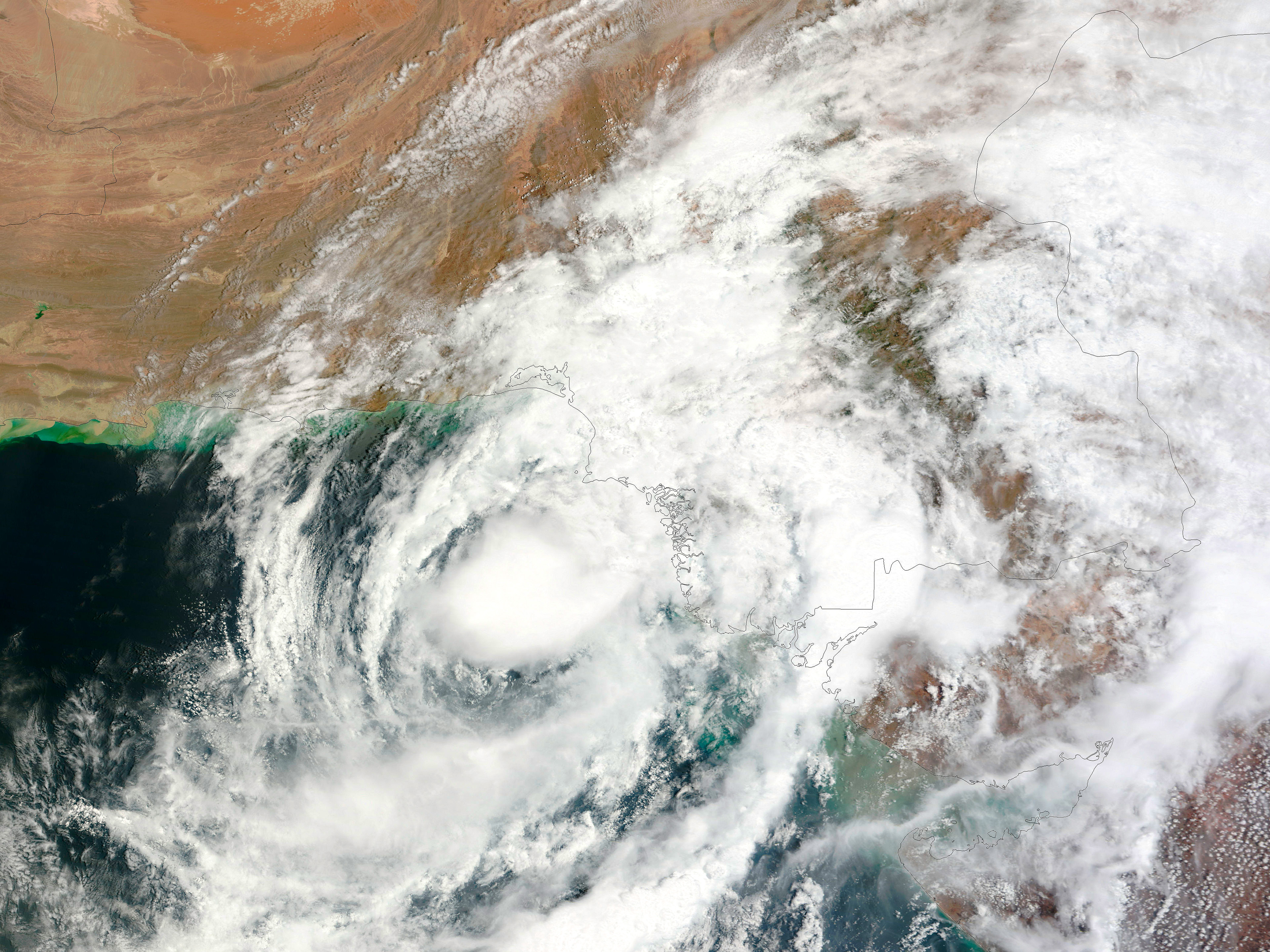
Cyclone Phet making second landfall near Karachi on 6 June 2010

- May 2001 – More than 100,000 people evacuated in southeastern Pakistan due to the threat from a powerful cyclone in the Arabian Sea. The storm struck Gujarat as a weakened cyclone on 29 May.
- 1 October 2004 – Cyclone Onil became the first named storm in the Indian Ocean, and meandered for several days off the coast of Gujarat. In Pakistan, Onil brought heavy rainfall and gusty winds. In Karachi, nine people died from the storm, as flooded streets and power outages contributed to at least two electrocution deaths.
- June 2007 – Powerful Cyclone Gonu remained well southwest of Pakistan, but it still produced heavy rainfall and strong winds in the city of Gwadar in Balochistan, where it caused damage to dozens of boats and school buildings in the area. It also caused high winds with light rainfall in Karachi and other coastal areas.
- 23 June 2007 – Cyclone Yemyin, which developed over the Bay of Bengal and intensified into a cyclone over the Arabian Sea, killed 200 people alone in Karachi city due to heavy rainfall and intense windstorms as it was moving towards Balochistan province. It made landfall near the towns of Ormara and Pasni in the Balochistan province on 26 June where it killed 300 people. Overall it killed 730 people and affected the lives of 2 million people in Pakistan making it the third deadliest cyclone in the history of the country.
- In November 2009, remnants of Cyclone Phyan caused gusty winds along the Sindh coast including Karachi. However six Pakistani fishermen were trapped in the storm later rescued by the Indian Navy.
- 6 June 2010 – Cyclone Phet made landfall near Karachi as a depression, having earlier dropped heavy rainfall along the Makran coast. Gwadar recorded 370 mm (15 in) of rainfall, which damaged 10,000 houses, and disrupted portions of the Makran Coastal Highway. Phet killed at least 18 people in Pakistan – 11 by electrocution, and 7 due to collapsed walls. The storm also injured dozens of others and left thousands of Pakistanis homeless. Damage was estimated at RS7 billion (US$80 million).
- 9–12 November 2010 – The remnants of Cyclone Jal impacted Pakistan.
- 18 May 2021 – Cyclone Tauktae's landfall in Gujarat caused a roof to collapse in Karachi by a severe dust storm, killing four people in the city.
- 30 September 2021 – A developing depression – later named Shaheen – produced gusty winds and rainfall in Karachi. A person died in Orangi from electrocution.
- 15 June 2023 - Cyclone Biparjoy made landfall on the border of Pakistan and India.

== Climatological statistics ==
Storms affecting Pakistan by month
Month	Number of storms
May	6
June	10
July	4
September	2
October	1
November	3

Storms affecting Pakistan by period
Period	Number of storms
1800s	2
1900–49	5
1950s	0
196	1
1970s	1
1980s	1
1990s	3
2000s	5
2010s	2
2020s	2

== See also ==
- List of tornadoes and tornado outbreaks in Asia
- List of wettest tropical cyclones by country
- List of Arabian Peninsula tropical cyclones

Weather in Pakistan

- Climate of Pakistan
- Drought in Pakistan
- List of floods in Pakistan
- List of extreme weather records in Pakistan
