= 2011 Kohistan floods =

Series of flash floods in Pakistan

The 2011 Kohistan floods are a series of flash floods that took place throughout the month of August 2011 in the Kohistan District of Khyber Pakhtunkhwa in northwest Pakistan. The floods, caused by overnight heavy rains, have left at least 63 people dead and washed away dozens of houses, settlements, livestock and vegetation.

The floods were the most destructive since the deadly 2010 Pakistan floods which rampaged the whole country.
