= Qamar-uz-Zaman Chaudhry =

Qamar-Uz-Zaman Chaudhry
- Born: Sargodha, Punjab, Pakistan
- Education: Government College University; Quaid-e-Azam University; University of the Philippines Los Baños
- Known for: Meteorogical Sciences and Technology
- Awards: Sitara-i-Imtiaz (2010); SAARC best scientist research award (1993); Pride of Performance Award (1999)
- Scientific career
- Fields: Climate Change & Meteorology
- Workplaces: Pakistan Meteorological Department; World Meteorological Organisation

Qamar-Uz-Zaman Chaudhry is a Pakistani climate scientist. He is a researcher in the fields of climate change, meteorology, atmospheric sciences, hydrology and seismology and has written over 50 articles in the fields of meteorology, atmospheric sciences, hydrology, seismology, plate tectonics and earthquakes. He is the lead author of Pakistan's first National Climate Change policy. He served as the Vice President of the World Meteorological Organisation.

== Early life ==
He was born in Sargodha, Pakistan. Chaudhry received his early education from Lahore. Later, he attended Government College University, where he received his B.Sc. in physics with honors and M.Sc. in physics from the Quaid-i-Azam University. He received his Ph.D. in meteorology from University of the Philippines Los Baños.

== Career ==
He joined Pakistan Meteorological Department (PMD) in 1971 and became director general in 1996.

During his tenure as head of PMD, he took several initiatives to modernize PMD to improve its services for the general public and climate-sensitive socioeconomic sectors of Pakistan. His initiatives included starting numerical weather prediction (NWP) system in Pakistan and establishing the following: National Drought Monitoring and Early Warning Centre, Research and Development Division, Flash Flood Warning System for the twin cities of Islamabad and Rawalpindi, National Tsunami Early Warning System, Tropical Cyclones Warning Center, and the Pollen Monitoring System.

He started the publication of the Pakistan Journal of Meteorology to promote research in meteorology, climate sciences and allied disciplines.

His contributions were involved in the disastrous 2005 Kashmir earthquake, which killed hundreds. He set up seismology and earthquake warning research centers in the Kashmir region and elsewhere.

Chaudhry published articles in national and international science journals. His articles spanned meteorology, extreme weather, forecast, hydrological and high impact weather systems technology, agricultural meteorology, global warming, climatic changes and natural disasters.

He served as Permanent Representative of Pakistan with WMO and as Secretary of the WMO/ESCAP Panel on Tropical Cyclone for the Bay of Bengal and the Arabian Sea.

In 2009, he served as Vice President of World Meteorological Organisation Asia Region.

He is working as an International Climate Change Specialist with the Asian Development Bank and UNEP DTU (a partnership between the United Nations Environment Programme and the Technical University of Denmark), and Senior Policy Advisor to the International Centre for Integrated Mountain Development.

He retired on 13 September 2010. His leadership and contributions led him to be Pakistan's father of modern meteorology.

== Recognition ==
- SAARC Best Young Scientist Research Award (1993)
- Pride of Performance award from the President of Pakistan (1999)
- Pakistan’s 3rd highest National Civil Award “Sitara-i-Imtiaz” (2011)
