= National Seismic Monitoring Centre =

Earthquake monitoring station in Islamabad, Pakistan

- Location: Islamabad, Pakistan
- Coordinates: 33°41′00.91″N 73°03′50.05″E
- Website: seismic.pmd.gov.pk

National Seismic Monitoring Centre is an earthquake monitoring center in Islamabad, Pakistan. The center is managed by Pakistan Meteorological Department.

== Background ==
The center operates a network of 20 broadband seismic stations and 15 short-period seismic stations to monitor the seismic activities in Pakistan and further detect any tsunami earthquake along Makran Subduction Zone. The center works in close coordination with National Tsunami Warning Centre, Karachi and Pakistan Navy. The pan-country network is equipped with British and Chinese seismic devices.
