= 2010 Pakistan floods =

2010 natural disaster in Pakistan

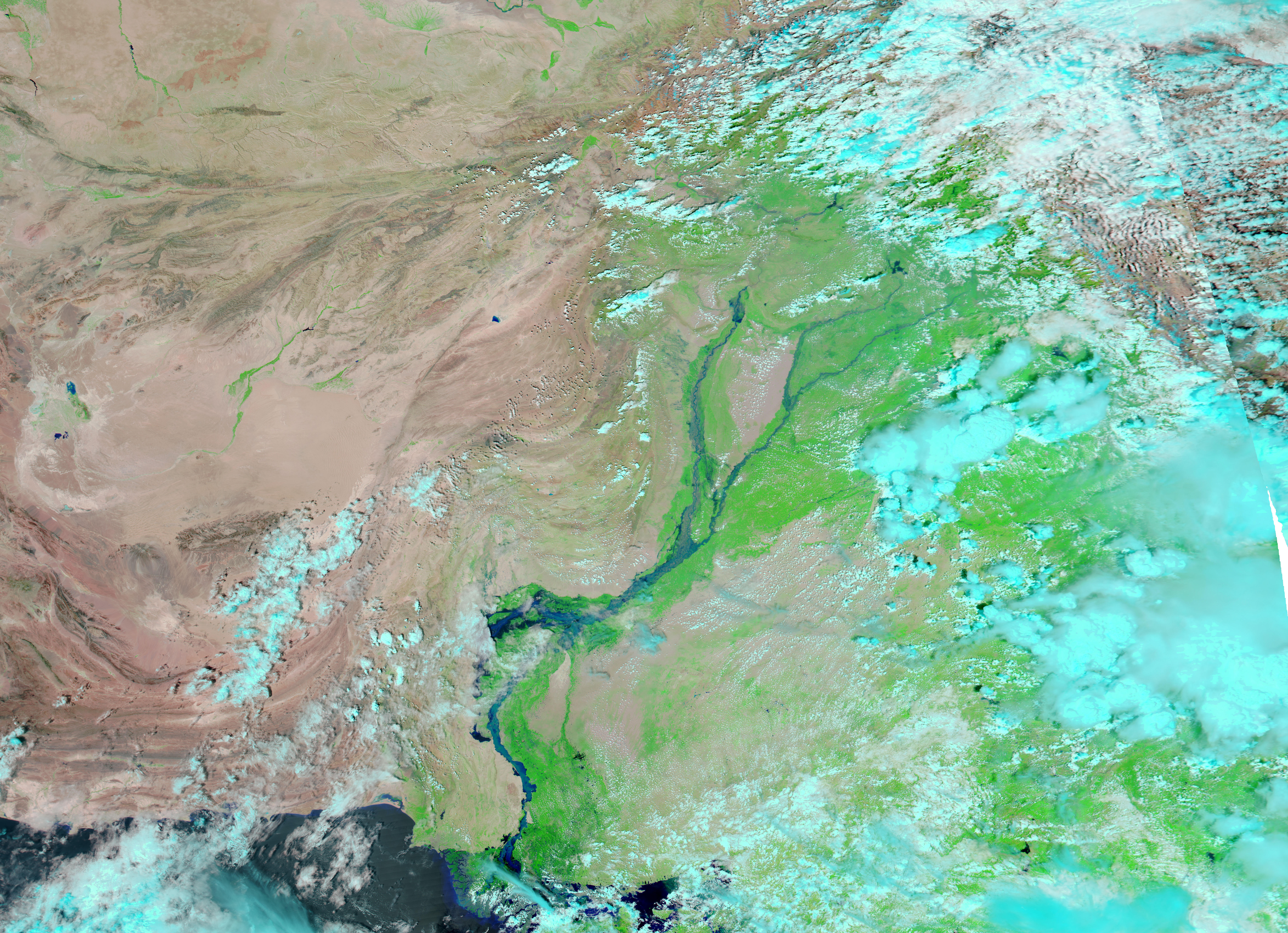
- A NASA satellite image showing the Indus River at the time of floods

Meteorological history
- Duration: 26 July 2010 – August 2010

Overall effects
- Fatalities: 1,985
- Damage: $43 billion USD (estimated)
- Areas affected: Khyber Pakhtunkhwa, Punjab, Sindh, Balochistan and Gilgit-Baltistan

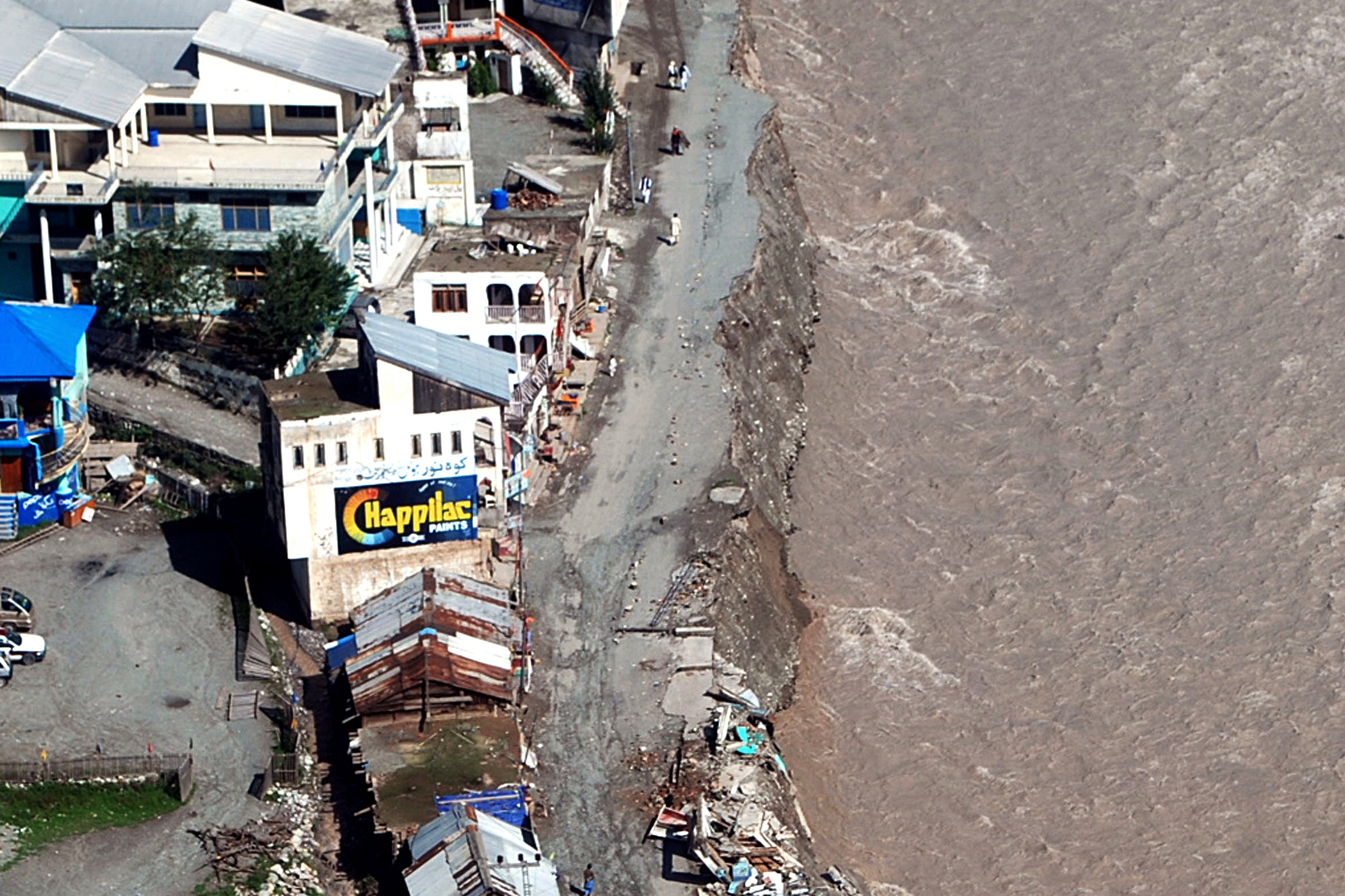
Swat river soaring view in 2010 flood

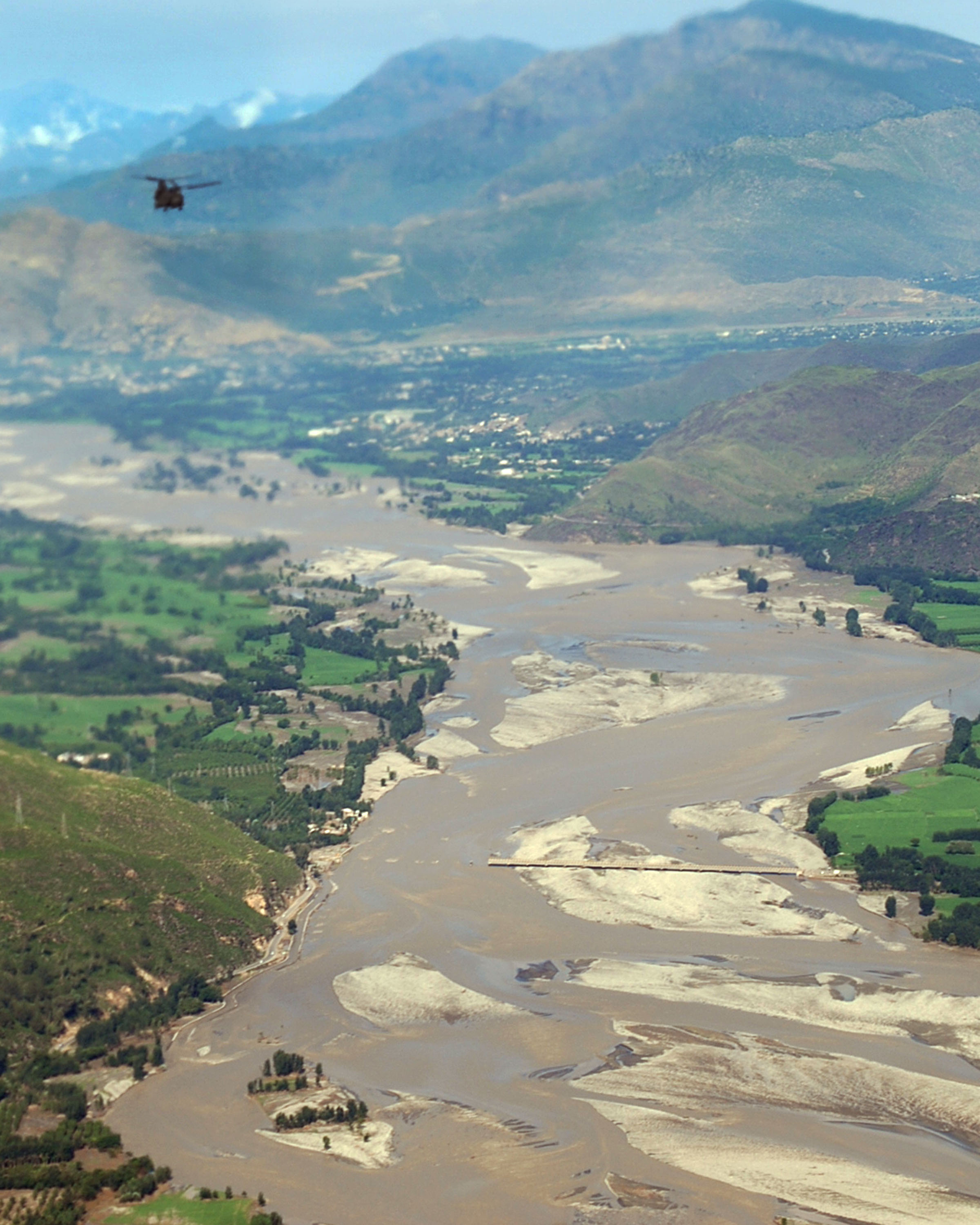
Swat river washed off bridge in Upper Swat

The 2010 floods in Pakistan began in late July, resulting from heavy monsoon rains in the Khyber Pakhtunkhwa, Sindh, Punjab and, Balochistan provinces of Pakistan, which affected the Indus River basin. Approximately one-fifth of Pakistan's total land area was affected by the floods, with Khyber Pakhtunkhwa facing the brunt of the damage, with over 90% of all the deaths occurring in that province. Nationwide, there were 1,985 deaths. According to Pakistani government data, the floods directly affected about 20 million people, mostly by destruction of property, livelihood and infrastructure.

UN Secretary-General Ban Ki-moon had initially asked for US$460 million (€420 million) for emergency relief, noting that the flood was the worst disaster he had ever seen. Only 20% of the relief funds requested had been received by 15 August 2010. The U.N. had been concerned that aid was not arriving fast enough, and the World Health Organization reported that ten million people were forced to drink unsafe water. The Pakistani economy was harmed by extensive damage to infrastructure and crops. Damage to structures was estimated to exceed US$4 billion (€2.5 billion), and wheat crop damages were estimated to be over US$500 million (€425 million). Total economic impact may have been as much as US$43 billion (€35 billion).

== Causes ==
The floods were driven by rain. The rainfall anomaly map published by NASA showed unusually intense monsoon rains attributed to La Niña. On 21 June, the Pakistan Meteorological Department cautioned that urban and flash flooding could occur from July to September in the north parts of the country. The same department recorded above-average rainfall in the months of July and August 2010 and monitored the flood wave progression. Discharge levels were comparable to those of the floods of 1988, 1995, and 1997. The monsoon rainfall of 2010 over the whole country was the highest since 1994 and the second highest during last 50 years.

A research by Utah State University analyzed conditional instability, moisture flux, and circulation features and the results support a persistent increase in conditional instability during the July premonsoon phase, accompanied by increased frequency of heavy rainfall events. The increased convective activity during the premonsoon phase agrees with the projected increase in the intensity of heavy rainfall events over northern Pakistan. Large-scale circulation analysis reveals an upper-level cyclonic anomaly over and to the west of Pakistan–a feature empirically associated with weak monsoon. The analysis also suggests that the anomalous circulation in 2010 is not sporadic but rather is part of a long-term trend that defies the typical linkage of strong monsoons with an anomalous anticyclone in the upper troposphere. An article in the New Scientist attributed the cause of the exceptional rainfall to "freezing" of the jet stream, a phenomenon that reportedly also caused unprecedented heat waves and wildfires in Russia as well as the 2007 United Kingdom floods.

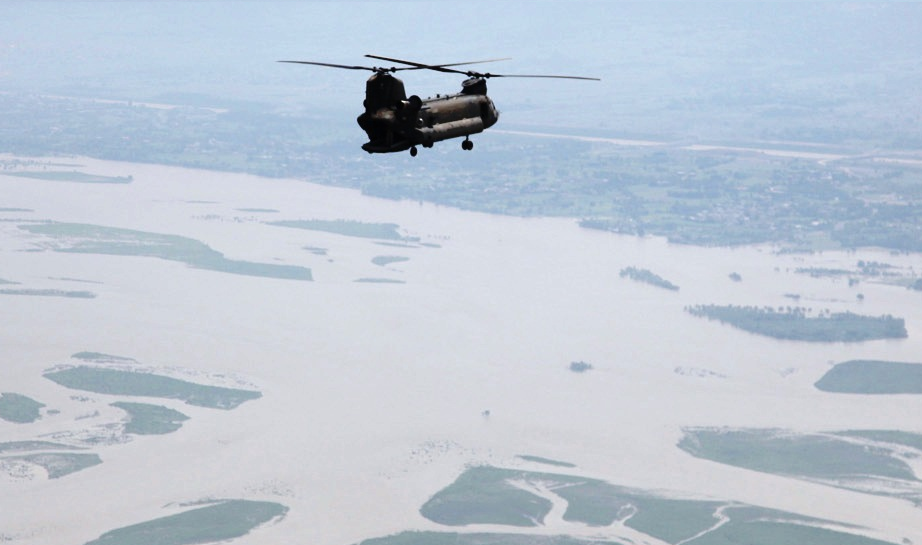
A U.S. Army Chinook flies over a flood-affected area

In response to previous Indus River floods in 1973 and 1976, Pakistan created the Federal Flood Commission (FFC) in 1977. The FFC operates under Pakistan's Ministry of Water and Power. It is charged with executing flood control projects and protecting lives and property of Pakistanis from the impact of floods. Since its inception the FFC has received Rs 87.8 billion (about US$900 million). FFC documents show that numerous projects were initiated, funded and completed, but reports indicate that little work has actually been done due to ineffective leadership and corruption.

== Flooding and impact ==
=== Floods ===
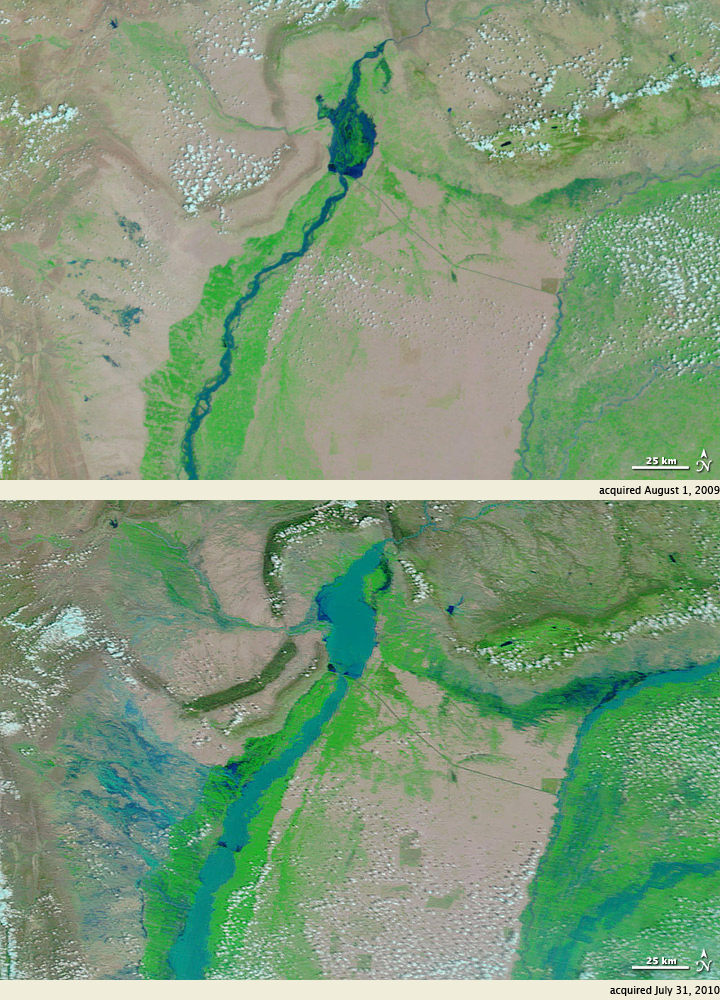
Satellite images of the upper Indus River valley, comparing water-levels on 1 August 2009 (top) and 31 July 2010 (bottom)

Monsoon rains were forecast to continue into early August and were described as the worst in this area in the last 80 years. The Pakistan Meteorological Department reported that over 200 millimetres (7.9 in) of rain fell over a 24-hour period in Khyber Pakhtunkhwa and Punjab. A record-breaking 274 millimetres (10.8 in) rain fell in Peshawar during 24 hours; the previous record was 187 millimetres (7.4 in) of rain in April 2009. On 28 July, the same heavy rains contributed to the crash of Airblue Flight 202 in the Margalla Hills. On 30 July 500,000 or more people had been displaced from their homes. On 30 July, Manuel Bessler, head of the UN Office for the Coordination of Humanitarian Affairs, stated that 36 districts were involved, and 950,000 people were affected, although within a day, reports increased that number to as high as a million, and by mid-August they increased the number to nearly 20 million affected.

By mid-August, according to the governmental Federal Flood Commission (FFC), the floods had caused the deaths of at least 1,540 people, while 2,088 people had received injuries, 557,226 houses had been destroyed, and over 6 million people had been displaced. One month later, the tally had risen to 1,781 deaths, 2,966 people with injuries, and more than 1.89 million homes destroyed.

The Khyber Pakhtunkhwa provincial minister of information, Mian Iftikhar Hussain, said "the infrastructure of this province was already destroyed by terrorism. Whatever was left was finished off by these floods." He also called the floods "the worst calamity in our history." Four million Pakistanis were left with food shortages.

The Karakoram Highway, which connects Pakistan with China, was closed after a bridge was destroyed. The ongoing devastating floods in Pakistan will have a severe impact on an already vulnerable population, according to the International Committee of the Red Cross (ICRC). In addition to all the other damage the floods caused, floodwater destroyed much of the health care infrastructure in the worst-affected areas, leaving inhabitants especially vulnerable to water-borne disease. In Sindh, the Indus River burst its banks near Sukkur on 8 August, submerging the village of Mor Khan Jatoi. Law and order disappeared, mainly in Sindh. Looters took advantage of the floods by ransacking abandoned homes using boats.

Affected areas as of 26 August 2010

In early August, the heaviest flooding moved southward along the Indus River from severely affected northern regions toward western Punjab, where at least 1,400,000 acres (570,000 ha) of cropland were destroyed, and toward the southern province of Sindh. The affected crops included cotton, sugarcane, rice, pulses, tobacco and animal fodder. Floodwaters and rain destroyed 700,000 acres (3,000 km^{2}) of cotton, 200,000 acres (800 km^{2}) acres each of rice and cane, 500,000 tonnes of wheat and 300,000 acres (1,000 km^{2}) of animal fodder. According to the Pakistan Cotton Ginners Association, the floods destroyed 2 million bales of cotton, which increased futures prices. 170,000 citizens (or 70% of the population) of the historic Sindh town of Thatta fled advancing flood waters on 27 August.

By mid-September the floods generally had begun to recede, although in some areas, such as Sindh, new floods were reported; the majority of the displaced persons had not been able to return home.

=== Heavy rainfalls recorded during the wet spell of July 2010 ===
Heavy rainfalls of more than 200 millimetres (7.9 in) were recorded during the four-day wet spell from 27 to 30 July 2010 in the provinces of Khyber Pakhtunkhwa and Punjab based on data from the Pakistan Meteorological Department.

City	Rainfall (mm)	Rainfall (in)	Province	Notes
Risalpur	*415	16.3	Khyber Pakhtunkhwa	
Islamabad	394	15.5	Islamabad Capital Territory	
Murree	373	14.6	Punjab	
Cherat	*372	14.6	Khyber Pakhtunkhwa	
Garhi Dopatta	346	13.6	Azad Kashmir	
Saidu Sharif	*338	13.3	Khyber Pakhtunkhwa	
Peshawar	*333	13.1	Khyber Pakhtunkhwa	
Kamra	308	12.1	Punjab	
Rawalakot	297	11.7	Azad Kashmir	
Muzaffarabad	292	11.5	Azad Kashmir	
Lahore	288	11.3	Punjab	
Mianwali	*271	10.6	Punjab	
Jhelum	269	10.6	Punjab	
Lower Dir	263	10.3	Khyber Pakhtunkhwa	
Kohat	*262	10.3	Khyber Pakhtunkhwa	
Balakot	256	10.0	Khyber Pakhtunkhwa	
Sialkot	255	10.0	Punjab	
Pattan	242	9.5	Azad Kashmir	
DIR	231	9.10	Khyber Pakhtunkhwa	
Gujranwala	222	8.7	Punjab	
Dera Ismail Khan	220	8.6	Khyber Pakhtunkhwa	
Rawalpindi	219	8.6	Punjab	

* Indicates new record.

The power infrastructure of Pakistan also took a severe blow from the floods, which damaged about 10,000 transmission lines and transformers, feeders and power houses in different flood-hit areas. Flood water inundated Jinnah Hydro power. The damage caused a power shortfall of 3.135 gigawatts.

Infectious diseases (e.g. gastroenteritis, diarrhoea, and skin diseases) due to lack of clean drinking water and sanitation pose a serious new risk to flood victims. On 14 August, the first documented case of cholera emerged in the town of Mingora, striking fear into millions of stranded flood victims, who were already suffering from gastroenteritis and diarrhoea. Pakistan also faced a malaria outbreak.

The International Red Cross reported that unexploded ordnance, such as mines and artillery shells, had been flushed downstream by the floods from areas in Kashmir and Waziristan and scattered in low-lying areas, posing a future risk to returning inhabitants.

The United Nations estimated that 800,000 people were cut off by floods in Pakistan and were only reachable by air. It also stated that at least 40 more helicopters are needed to ferry lifesaving aid to increasingly desperate people. Many of those cut off are in the mountainous northwest, where roads and bridges have been swept away.

By order of President Asif Ali Zardari, there were no official celebrations of Pakistan's 63rd Independence Day on 14 August, due to the calamity.

== Potential long-term effects ==
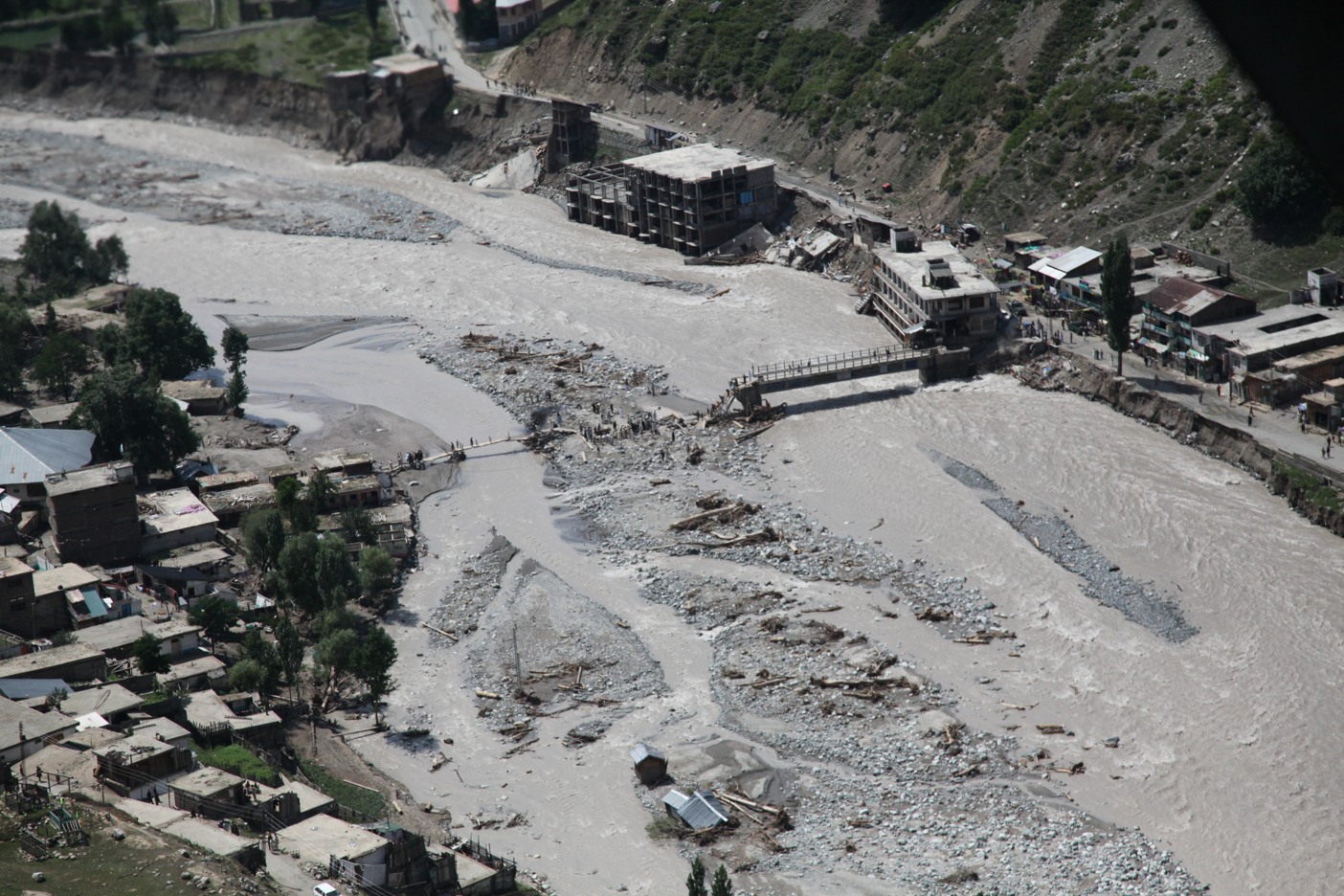
A bridge damaged by the flooding

=== Flood ===
Floods submerged 17 million acres (69,000 km^{2}) of Pakistan's most fertile crop land, killed 200,000 livestock and washed away massive amounts of grain. A major concern was that farmers would be unable to meet the fall deadline for planting new seeds in 2010, which implied a loss of food production in 2011, and potential long term food shortages. The agricultural damage reached more than 2.9 billion dollars, and included over 700,000 acres (2,800 km^{2}) of lost cotton crops, 200,000 acres (810 km^{2}) of sugar cane and 200,000 acres (810 km^{2}) of rice, in addition to the loss of over 500,000 tonnes of stocked wheat, 300,000 acres (1,200 km^{2}) of animal fodder and the stored grain losses.

Agricultural crops such as cotton, rice, and sugarcane and to some extent mangoes were badly affected in Punjab, according to a Harvest Tradings-Pakistan spokesman. He called for the international community to fully participate in the rehabilitation process, as well as for the revival of agricultural crops in order to get better GDP growth in the future.

In affected Multan Division in South Punjab, some people were seen to be engaging in price-gouging in this disaster, raising prices up to Rs 130/kg. Some called for Zarai Taraqiati Bank Limited to write off all agricultural loans in the affected areas in Punjab, Sindh and Khyber Pukhtunkhwa especially for small farmers.

On 24 September, the World Food Programme announced that about 70% of Pakistan's population, mostly in rural areas, did not have adequate access to proper nutrition.

Already resurgent in the Federally Administered Tribal Areas and Khyber-Pakhtunkhwa province, agricultural devastation brought on by the floods left Pakistan more susceptible to an increase in poppy cultivation, given the crop's resiliency and relatively few inputs.

=== Infrastructure ===
Floods damaged an estimated 2,433 miles (3,916 km) of highway and 3,508 miles (5,646 km) of railway and repairs are expected to cost at least US$158 million and $131 million, respectively. Public building damage is estimated at $1 billion. Aid donors estimate that 5,000 schools were destroyed.

==== Climate-resilient model villages ====
Following the 2010 floods, the Punjab government subsequently constructed 22 'disaster-resilient' model villages, comprising 1885 single-storey homes, together with schools and health centres. The Climate & Development Knowledge Network was engaged to advise on how to make the new infrastructure resilient to extreme weather events occurring in the future. The idea was that the villages should provide 'triple wins' of limiting greenhouse gas emissions, promoting development and building resilience to climatic events. Now inhabited, the model villages incorporate biogas plants, solar energy systems, livestock sheds, covered sewerage, brick-paved streets, parks, play areas, markets and community centres.

=== Taliban insurgency ===
It was reported that the flood would divert Pakistani military forces from fighting the Pakistani Taliban insurgents (TTP) in the northwest to help in the relief effort, giving Taliban fighters a reprieve to regroup. Helping flood victims gave the US an opportunity to improve its image.

Pakistani Taliban also engaged in relief efforts, making inroads where the government was absent or seen as corrupt. As the flood dislodged many property markers, it was feared that governmental delay and corruption would give the Taliban the opportunity to settle these disputes swiftly. In August a Taliban spokesperson asked the Pakistani government to reject Western help from "Christians and Jews" and claimed that the Taliban could raise $20 million to replace that aid.

According to a US official, the TTP issued a threat saying that it would launch attacks against foreigners participating in flood relief operations. In response, the United Nations said it was reviewing security arrangements for its workers. The World Health Organization stated that work in the Khyber Pakhtunkhwa province was already suffering because of security concerns.

A self-proclaimed Taliban spokesperson based in Orakzai told The Express Tribune: "We have not issued any such threat; and we don't have any plans to attack relief workers." Nevertheless, three American Christians were reported killed by the Taliban on 25 August in the Swat Valley.

=== Political effects ===
The floods' aftermath was thought likely contribute to public perception of inefficiency and to political unrest. These political effects of the floods were compared with that of the 1970 Bhola cyclone. The scepticism within the country extended to outside donors. Less than 20% of the pledged aid was scheduled to go through the government, according to Prime Minister Yousuf Raza Gilani, with the remainder flowing through non-governmental organisations. The government's response was complicated by insurgencies (in Balochistan and Waziristan), growing urban sectarian discord, increasing suicide bombings against core institutions and relations with India.

=== Economic effects ===
On 7 September 2010, the International Labour Organization reported that the floods had cost more than 5.3 million jobs, stating that "productive and labour intensive job creation programmes are urgently needed to lift millions of people out of poverty that has been aggravated by flood damage". Forecasts estimated that the GDP growth rate of 4% prior to the floods would turn to −2% to −5% followed by several additional years of below-trend growth. As a result, Pakistan was unlikely to meet the International Monetary Fund's target budget deficit cap of 5.1% of GDP, and the existing $55 billion of external debt was set to grow. Crop losses were expected to impact textile manufacturing, Pakistan's largest export sector. The loss of over 10 million head of livestock along with the loss of other crops would reduce agricultural production by more than 15%. Toyota and Unilever Pakistan said that the floods would sap growth, necessitating production cuts as people coped with the destruction. Parvez Ghias, the chief executive of Pakistan's largest automotor manufacturer Toyota, described the economy's state as "fragile". Nationwide car sales were predicted to fall as much as 25%, forcing automakers to reduce production in October–2010 from the prior level of 200 cars per day. Milk supplies fell by 15%, which caused the retail price of milk to increase by Pk Rs 4 (5 US cents) per litre.

== Relief efforts ==
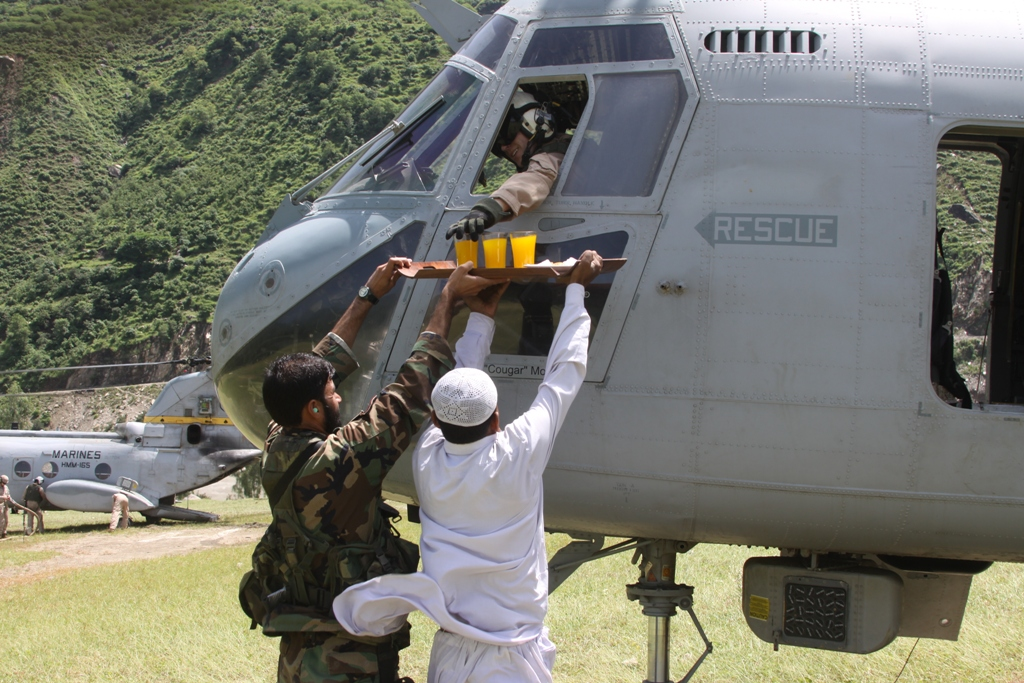
A Pakistani military personnel and a civilian offer fruit juice and cookies to US Marines in a CH-46E Sea Knight during humanitarian relief efforts in Khyber- Pakhtunkhwa Province, Pakistan

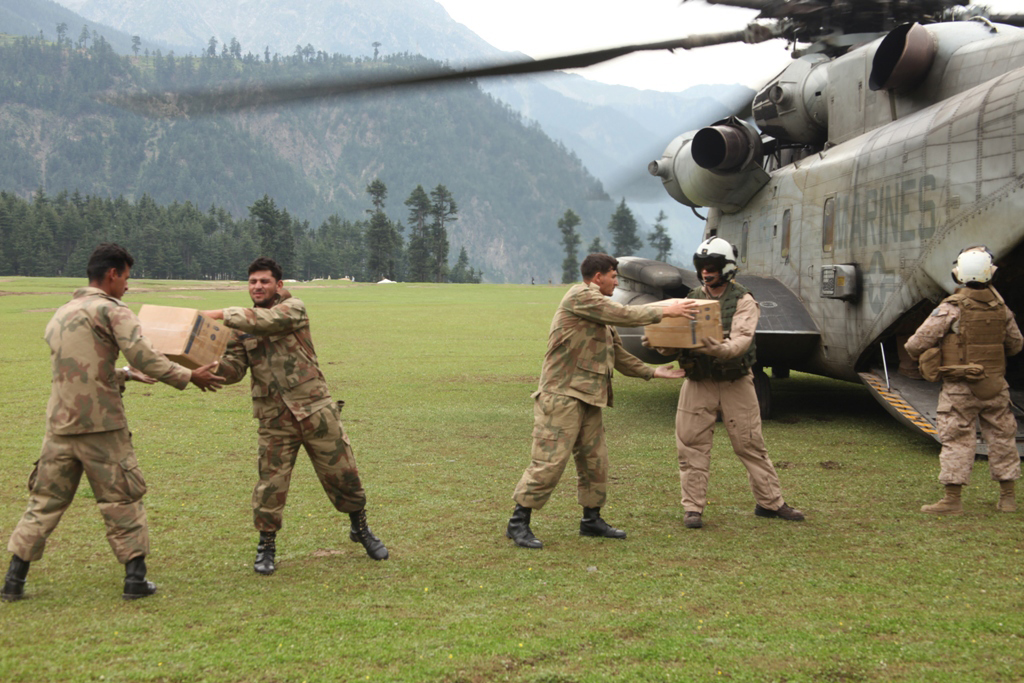
Pakistani soldiers and U.S. Marines offload supplies from a Super Stallion.

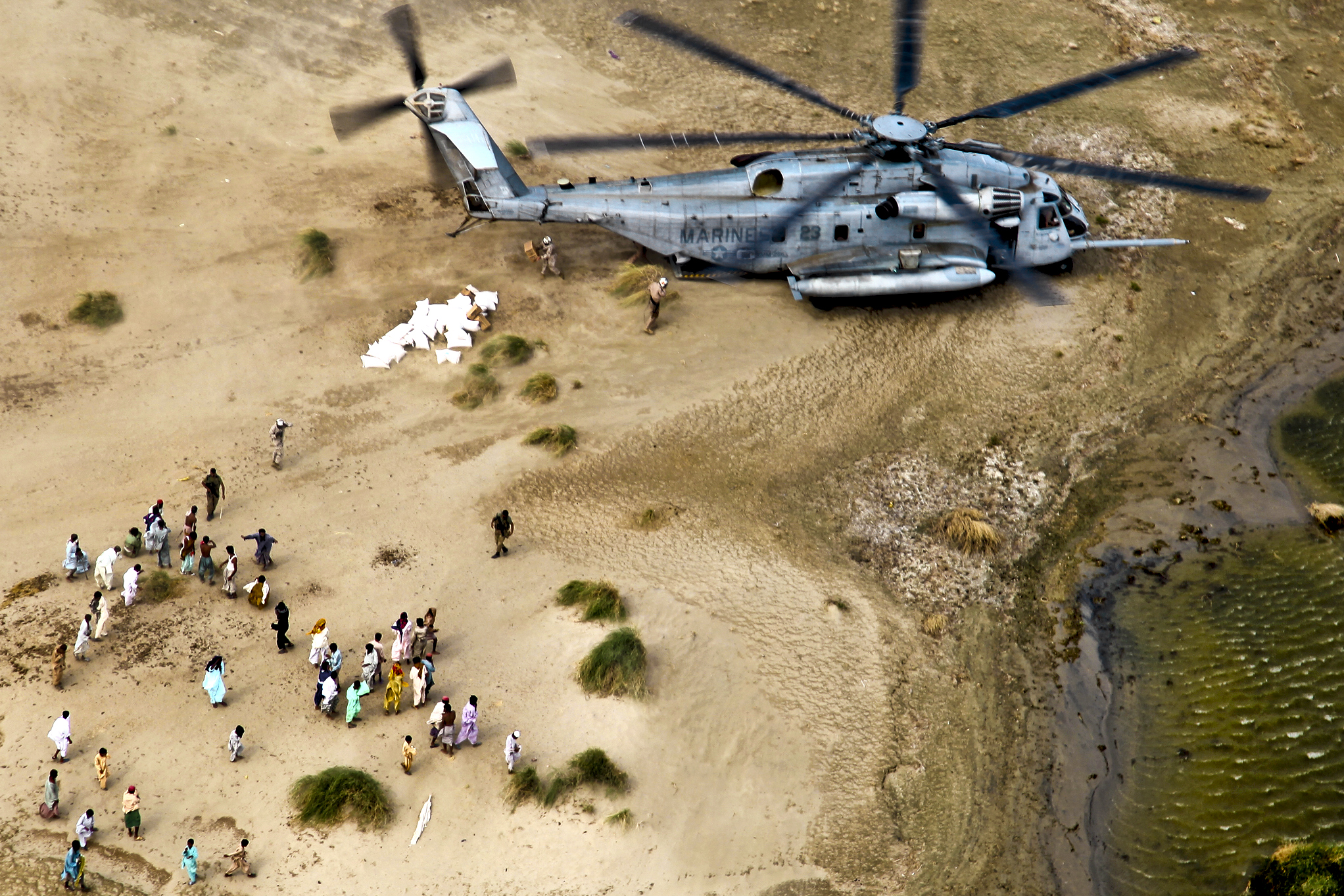
U.S. Marines CH-53E Super Stallion unload food and supplies for Pakistani flood victims.

By the end of July 2010, Pakistan had appealed to international donors for help in responding to the disaster, having provided twenty-one helicopters and 150 boats to assist affected people, according to its National Disaster Management Authority. At that time the US embassy in Pakistan had provided seven helicopters. The United Nations launched its relief efforts and appealed for US$460 million (€420 million) to provide immediate help, including food, shelter and clean water. On 14 August, UN Secretary-General Ban Ki-moon visited Pakistan to oversee and discuss the relief efforts. A Pakistani army spokesman said that troops had been deployed in all affected areas and had rescued thousands of people. Prime Minister Yousaf Raza Gillani visited the province and directed the Pakistan Navy to help evacuate the flood victims. By early August, more than 352,291 people have been rescued.

By the end of August, the Relief Web Financial Tracking service indicated that worldwide donations for humanitarian assistance had come to $687 million, with a further $324 million promised in uncommitted pledges.

Since the early stages of the emergency, the United Nations had warned of a potential "second wave of death" that would result from post-flood disease and food shortages, stating that 3.5 million children were at risk of death if they did not get assistance, including due to cholera. UN spokesperson Maurizio Giuliano stated that "an already colossal disaster [was] getting worse and requiring an even more colossal response", referring to the relief operations as "a marathon at sprint pace" and acknowledging shortcomings in the response insofar as the needs were outpacing available resources also due to endless rains. He indicated that the floods had a worse impact than several other recent natural disasters combined, and that they were the worst natural disaster in United Nations history.

According to UNOCHA, by 2011, a total of $2,653,281,105 had been raised in humanitarian support, the largest amount by the US (25.8%), followed by private individuals and organisations (13.4%) and Japan (11.3%).

With need for substantial support to repair infrastructure, US Secretary of State Hillary Clinton suggested that the Pakistani government enlarge its tax base by asking the wealthy citizens of Pakistan to contribute more for their country; by that time both the US and the EU each had contributed about US$450 million, €395 million for the relief effort.

=== Foreign aid and support from foreign governments ===
The governments of at least 75 nations donated hundreds of millions of dollars in aid and supplies to Pakistan following the flooding. Charitable funds were also established to provide relief for those affected by the flooding, and other nations sent in search and rescue teams to assist in rescue and recovery operations. Aid was also sent in by train and on trucks, and dozens of privately held companies made considerable monetary donations.

== Criticism of response ==
The Pakistani government was blamed for sluggish and disorganised response to the floods. The perceived disorganised and insufficient response led to riots, with looting of aid convoys by hunger-stricken people. The lack of a unified government response allowed Islamist groups such as Lashkar-e-Taiba and Jamaat-e-Islami to supply aid with minimal resistance. Zardari was also criticised for going ahead with visits to meet leaders in Britain and France at a time when his nation was facing catastrophe. In Sindh, the ruling Pakistan People's Party ministers were accused of using their influence to redirect floodwaters from their crops while risking densely populated areas leading Pakistani UN ambassador Abdullah Hussain Haroon to call for an inquiry.

The United Nations criticised the international community for responding slowly, despite the ferocity and magnitude of the disaster. On 9 August, only $45 million in aid had been committed, which is far less than usual for this scale of disaster. In an analysis of the response to the disaster, The Guardian said that there was a dire need of relief. It quoted the UN's humanitarian affairs coordination office, saying that "[s]ix million [of the 14 million affected] are children and 3 million women of child-bearing age. This is a higher figure than in the 2004 Indian Ocean tsunami."

An analysis by AP's correspondent, Nahal Toosi, suggested that the low death toll, the protracted timeline, the lack of celebrity involvement, the impression of government incompetence and donor fatigue were contributing factors.

British Prime Minister David Cameron was accused by Pakistan of hampering international aid efforts after he claimed that Pakistan was responsible for promoting terrorism.

=== Neglect of minorities ===
It was reported that members of Pakistan's Ahmadiyya community, who were caught up in floods in Muzaffargarh, were not rescued from their homes because rescuers felt that Muslims must be given priority.

Members of the Sikh community, who arrived at gurdwaras in Lahore, also complained of government apathy. They said members of their community were abandoned in Khyber-Pakhtoonkhwa and had to arrange for rescues by themselves.

Protests broke out in Lyari relief camp after Hindu victims of the Baagri and Waghari nomadic tribes were served beef by the authorities in violation of their religious beliefs, which forbade beef consumption. The situation was resolved after officials from The Minority Affairs Ministry intervened.

=== Inequality ===
Haroon alleged that wealthy feudal warlords and landowners in Pakistan had diverted funds and resources away from the poor and into their own private relief efforts. There were also allegations that local authorities colluded with the warlords to divert funds. The floods accentuated Pakistan's sharp class divisions. The wealthy, with better access to transportation and other facilities, suffered far less than the poor.

== See also ==
- 2022 Pakistan floods
- 1992 India–Pakistan floods
- 2005 Kashmir earthquake
- 2010 China floods
- 2010 Ladakh floods
- 2010 Northern Hemisphere heat waves
- 2011 Sindh floods
- List of deadliest floods
- List of extreme weather records in Pakistan
- List of floods in Pakistan
- Nursing in Pakistan
