= Army Desert Warfare School =

Pakistan Army training formation for desert warfare

Coordinates: 25°30′44″N 69°46′38″E

Pakistan Army Desert Warfare School
- Logo of the school
- Active: 14 February 1980
- Country: Pakistan
- Branch: Pakistan Army
- Type: Training formation
- Garrison/HQ: Chhor Cantt, Sindh in Pakistan.
- Nickname: ADWS

The Pakistan Army Desert Warfare School (reporting name: ADWS) is a military training school of Pakistan Army that provides instructions, training, and special skills on desert warfare to its troops.

The school is headquartered in Chhor Cantonment in Chhor, Hyderabad, Sindh, Pakistan.

== Training overview ==
In 1980, the Army GHQ instructed the Corps of Education to established the training formation for its troops keeping in mind the importance of desert warfare. The formation of the school took place in two stages. In first stage the school started functioning as Desert Warfare Wing of Divisional Battle School since 14 February 1980. The second stage saw the introduction of the advanced training methods, military planning, and the institution was upgraded to Army Desert Warfare School on 13 September 1987.

The desert warfare school is, however, not restricted to the army department but the instructions, training and the certification pins have been provided to the Pakistan Navy, Pakistan Marines, and the mission elements of the Pakistan Air Force in desert warfare operations.
