= Sher Shall =

- Valley
- Location within Pakistan
- Coordinates: 35°51′58.68″N 71°41′58.36″E
- Country: Pakistan
- State: Khyber Pakhtunkhwa
- District: Lower Chitral
- Established: 14 August 1947

Government
  - Type: Municipal Corporation
  - Body: Municipal Corporation

Area
  - Total: 26 km^{2} (10 sq mi)

Population (2003)
  - Total: 463
  - Density: 18/km^{2} (46/sq mi)

Languages
  - Official: Chitrali
- Time zone: UTC+5 (PST)
- Postal Index Number: 1720 - 0xx
- Telephone code: +924 - 7
- Website: www.chitral.org

Sher Shall is a village in Lower Chitral District, Karim Abad, Pakistan. It is near Terich Mir, the highest mountain in the terrain of Hindu Kush. Prior to 1947, the area was under the rule of Katoor dynasty of Chitral. At that time the village was governed by local governor prince Muftahul Mulk. When Chitral was acknowledged as a district of Pakistan, Sher Shall fell into the domain of Garam Chashma Tehsil, becoming a part of Chitral. The village has a population of around 700 people across approximately 80 households. The area is known for fruits such as apple, apricot, pear, cherries, and mulberry grapes.

== Geography ==
This village is close to Tajikistan in the north-west and shares boundaries with the Afghan province of Badakhshan in the south. A famous pass 'Momusaan' joins Sher Shall with Arkari valley on the north side very near to Afghan border called Drasun.

== Climate ==
The climate of Sher Shall is warm relative to the rest of the villages in Karimabad Valley, mainly because the sun shines directly on Sher Shall. In February 2017, at least 14 people were killed and 9 injured by an avalanche in Sher Shall.
