= Nahal Toosi =

21st-century American journalist

- Born: Tehran, Iran
- Citizenship: American
- Education: University of North Carolina at Chapel Hill (BA)
- Occupation: Journalist
- Years active: 2000–present
- Employer: Politico

Nahal Toosi is an American journalist currently working as a foreign affairs correspondent for Politico, who in 2011 was one of the first reporters to reach Abbottabad, Pakistan, after the death of Osama bin Laden and in 2018 covered the Rohingya refugee crisis.

== Background ==
Nahal Toosi was born in Tehran, Iran. Her family immigrated to the United States when she was six years old. She was valedictorian at McKinney High School in McKinney, Texas. She completed a BA at the University of North Carolina at Chapel Hill, and had edited and reported for the student-run The Daily Tar Heel.

== Career ==
Toosi worked for the Milwaukee Journal Sentinel on such topics as higher education, a foreign correspondent (Iraq (including the US invasion in 2003), Egypt, Thailand, and Germany). She joined the Associated Press (2005) as an editor and reporter based in: New York, Islamabad, Kabul, and London. She was one of the first foreign correspondents in 2011 to reach Abbottabad, Pakistan, after the killing of Osama bin Laden. She joined Politico (2013) where she is now senior foreign affairs correspondent.

She has contributed to Rohingya Crisis project at the Pulitzer Center. She has spoken publicly at the College of William & Mary and on news shows including: CBS News, WNYC, WAMU, KCRW, and Wisconsin Public Radio.

== Works ==
- Politico
- Associated Press (via Washington Examiner)
- Associated Press (via Daily Star)
