= Chhor, Sindh =

Pakistani town

Chhor ڇور
- Town Council
- Location within Pakistan
- Coordinates: 25°3′40″N 69°46′57″E
- Country: Pakistan
- Province: Sindh
- District: Umerkot
- Elevation: 4 m (13 ft)
- Highest elevation: 15 m (49 ft)

Population (2023)
  - Total: 21,178
- Time zone: UTC+5 (PST)

Chhor (Sindhi: ڇور) is a town situated in Umerkot District, Sindh, Pakistan. It has an altitude of 4 metres (13 ft). It lies on the Mirpur Khas-Jodhpur railway line. Umarkot is to the west, Sanghar to the north, Khokharapar to the east and Badin and Mithi Districts to the south. It is the start of the Thar Desert, which further touches the Indian border to the east. The Pakistan Army Desert Warfare School is located here.

== Demographics ==
| Census | Population |
|---|---|
| 1998 | 13,981 |
| 2017 | 19,930 |
| 2023 | 21,178 |

== Climate ==
Chhor has a hot desert climate (Köppen climate classification BWh) with very hot summers and warm winters. The main rainfall is in the monsoon season, which lasts from June to September.

Climate data for Chhor (1991–2020, extremes 1957–present)
| Month | Jan | Feb | Mar | Apr | May | Jun | Jul | Aug | Sep | Oct | Nov | Dec | Year |
|---|---|---|---|---|---|---|---|---|---|---|---|---|---|
| Record high °C (°F) | 34.0 (93.2) | 37.7 (99.9) | 45.2 (113.4) | 49.0 (120.2) | 49.4 (120.9) | 52.0 (125.6) | 46.4 (115.5) | 43.0 (109.4) | 44.0 (111.2) | 44.0 (111.2) | 40.0 (104.0) | 35.5 (95.9) | 52.0 (125.6) |
| Mean daily maximum °C (°F) | 26.8 (80.2) | 30.2 (86.4) | 35.4 (95.7) | 40.3 (104.5) | 42.2 (108.0) | 40.8 (105.4) | 37.3 (99.1) | 35.4 (95.7) | 36.2 (97.2) | 37.7 (99.9) | 33.6 (92.5) | 28.9 (84.0) | 35.4 (95.7) |
| Daily mean °C (°F) | 16.7 (62.1) | 20.0 (68.0) | 25.5 (77.9) | 30.6 (87.1) | 33.8 (92.8) | 33.9 (93.0) | 31.9 (89.4) | 30.5 (86.9) | 30.2 (86.4) | 28.7 (83.7) | 23.2 (73.8) | 18.3 (64.9) | 26.9 (80.4) |
| Mean daily minimum °C (°F) | 6.5 (43.7) | 9.7 (49.5) | 15.5 (59.9) | 21.0 (69.8) | 25.2 (77.4) | 27.1 (80.8) | 26.7 (80.1) | 25.5 (77.9) | 24.2 (75.6) | 19.6 (67.3) | 12.7 (54.9) | 7.7 (45.9) | 18.5 (65.3) |
| Record low °C (°F) | −2.8 (27.0) | −2.0 (28.4) | −1.6 (29.1) | 9.0 (48.2) | 11.8 (53.2) | 20.0 (68.0) | 19.5 (67.1) | 19.5 (67.1) | 17.5 (63.5) | 8.8 (47.8) | 1.1 (34.0) | −3.3 (26.1) | −3.3 (26.1) |
| Average precipitation mm (inches) | 1.2 (0.05) | 4.6 (0.18) | 2.0 (0.08) | 2.2 (0.09) | 4.5 (0.18) | 19.3 (0.76) | 70.5 (2.78) | 75.6 (2.98) | 59.1 (2.33) | 9.0 (0.35) | 1.0 (0.04) | 1.2 (0.05) | 250.2 (9.85) |
| Average precipitation days (≥ 1.0 mm) | 0.4 | 0.5 | 0.4 | 0.4 | 0.1 | 1.6 | 4.0 | 4.7 | 2.5 | 0.4 | 0.2 | 0.3 | 15.5 |
| Average relative humidity (%) | 46 | 46 | 43 | 41 | 46 | 56 | 66 | 69 | 63 | 50 | 47 | 49 | 52 |
Source 1: NOAA
Source 2: (extremes), Deutscher Wetterdienst (humidity 1961-1995)
