= Drought in Pakistan =

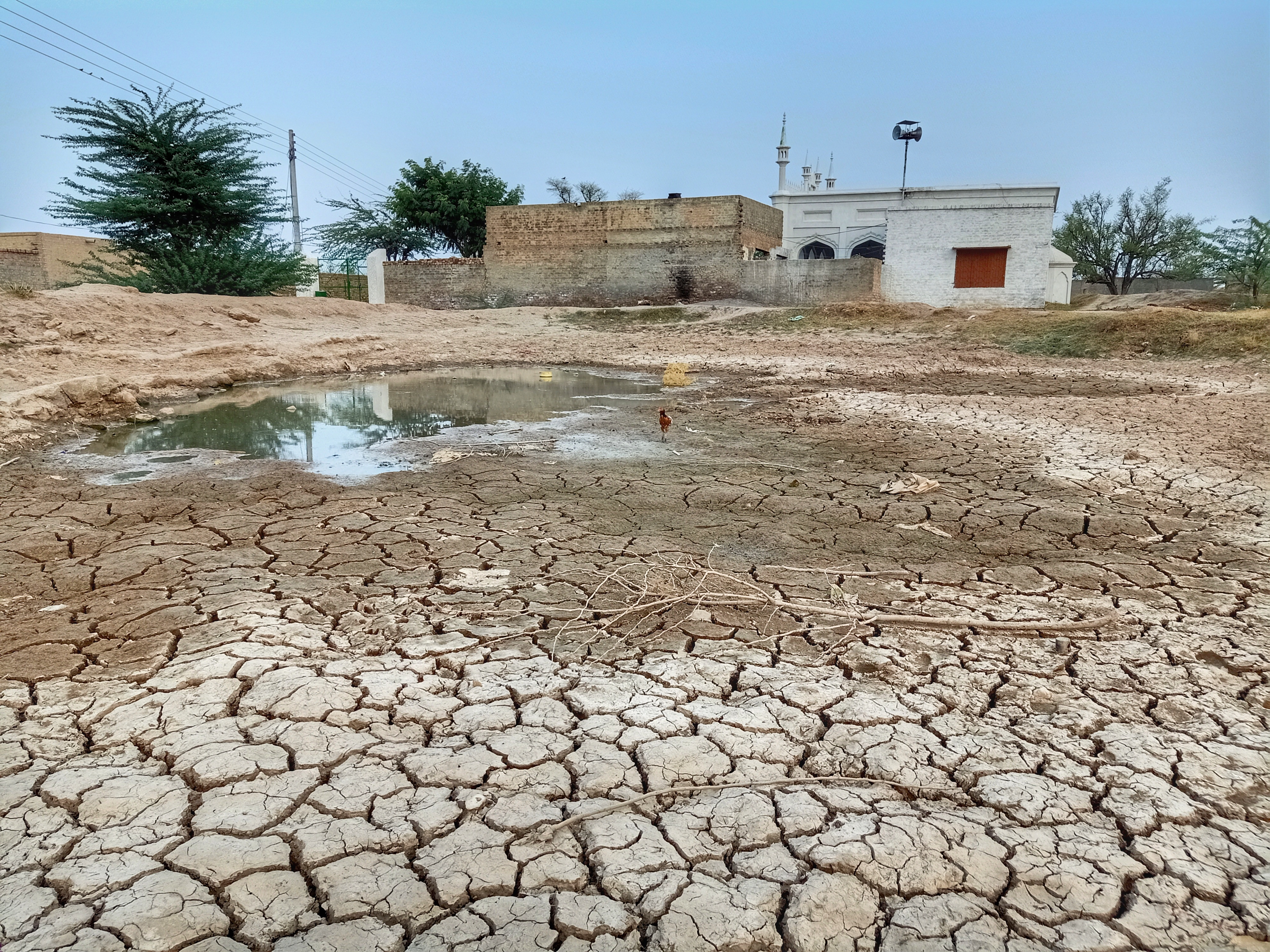
Dried soil in Thamewali, Punjab, Pakistan.

Pakistan is the fifteenth most water stressed country in the world.

Drought in Pakistan has become a frequent phenomenon in the country. The drought of 1998–2002 is considered worst in 50 years. According to a report issued by the Economic Survey of Pakistan, the drought is one of the factors responsible for poor growth performance. Balochistan especially the western and central parts of the province remain in the grip of drought almost all year round. Noreen Haider. Living with disasters. ndma.gov.pk Drought in the country is common; if the monsoon season fails to deliver rains then drought emerges.

== See also ==
- Climate of Pakistan
- Tropical cyclones in the Arabian Sea
- List of floods in Pakistan
- List of extreme weather records in Pakistan
