= Pakistan Meteorological Department =

Pakistani government institution (founded 1947)

- محکمہ موسمیات پاکستان

Agency overview
- Formed: 1947; 79 years ago
- Jurisdiction: Government of Pakistan
- Headquarters: Islamabad, Pakistan
- Agency executive: Sahibzad Khan, Director-General
- Parent department: Aviation Division (Pakistan)
- Website: pmd.gov.pk

The Pakistan Meteorological Department (PMD) (Urdu: محکمہ موسمیات پاکستان, also known as Pakistan Met Office), is an autonomous and independent institution tasked with providing weather forecasts and public warnings concerning weather for protection, safety and general information.

Apart from meteorology, it is also involved in monitoring as well as investigating weather phenomena, seismology, hydrology and research in astrophysics, climate change, aeronautical engineering, and renewable energy resources across the country. It is headquartered in Islamabad.

Until 1991, PMD provided aviation weather services to defence forces through regular deputation of meteorologists to the Pakistan Air Force (PAF). However in 1991, PAF formed its own Met branch, and officers are now inducted on a regular basis in PAF to meet aviation requirements. The main training for meteorologists is, however, imparted by PMD at Pakistan Institute of Meteorology and Geo Physics Karachi, through formally recognized courses. PAF Met branch is now providing weather services to PAF, Pakistan Army, Pakistan Navy, and paramilitary forces. PAF's main Met offices are located in Karachi, Jacobabad, Shorkot, Sargodha, Mianwali, Rawalpindi, Kamra, Risalpur and Peshawar.

PMD has offices and research facilities in all provinces and territories of the country.

== History ==
Shortly after independence in 1947, the Pakistan Meteorological Department was established and inherited 15 meteorological observatories from the Central Meteorological Organization of the British Raj. In 1948, PMD began providing basic weather forecast to Pakistan's print media. In the 1950s, the meteorological department became one of the leading scientific institutions in Pakistan; concerning itself in the field of research in space and atmospheric sciences, it worked in close coordination with the Ministry of Defence (MoD) and the Ministry of Environment (MoEn) for reporting accurate weather information for aviation and hydrography. In the 1960s, the meteorological department was split and the Pakistan Navy Hydrographic Department was established for the Pakistan Navy. Some of Pakistan's most notable and reputable scientists have been affiliated with the PMD. It assisted the federal government in establishing the SUPARCO in 1961, where many of its atmospheric scientists and technical staff joined the new space agency. The PMD has also assisted and lead studies in the Geomagnetic Field Monitoring Program of SUPARCO. Since its establishment, the PMD has become one of the leading governmental scientific institution in guiding the government in environmental and space policy formation. In 1965, the first televised weather forecast was broadcast by PTV. Since 1974, the meteorological department has been collecting data on seismic activity in Pakistan and thus is able to act as a consultant in seismic design of dams, buildings as well as disaster relief schemes. PMD's flood forecasting system has assisted the other government departments as well.

== Directorates ==
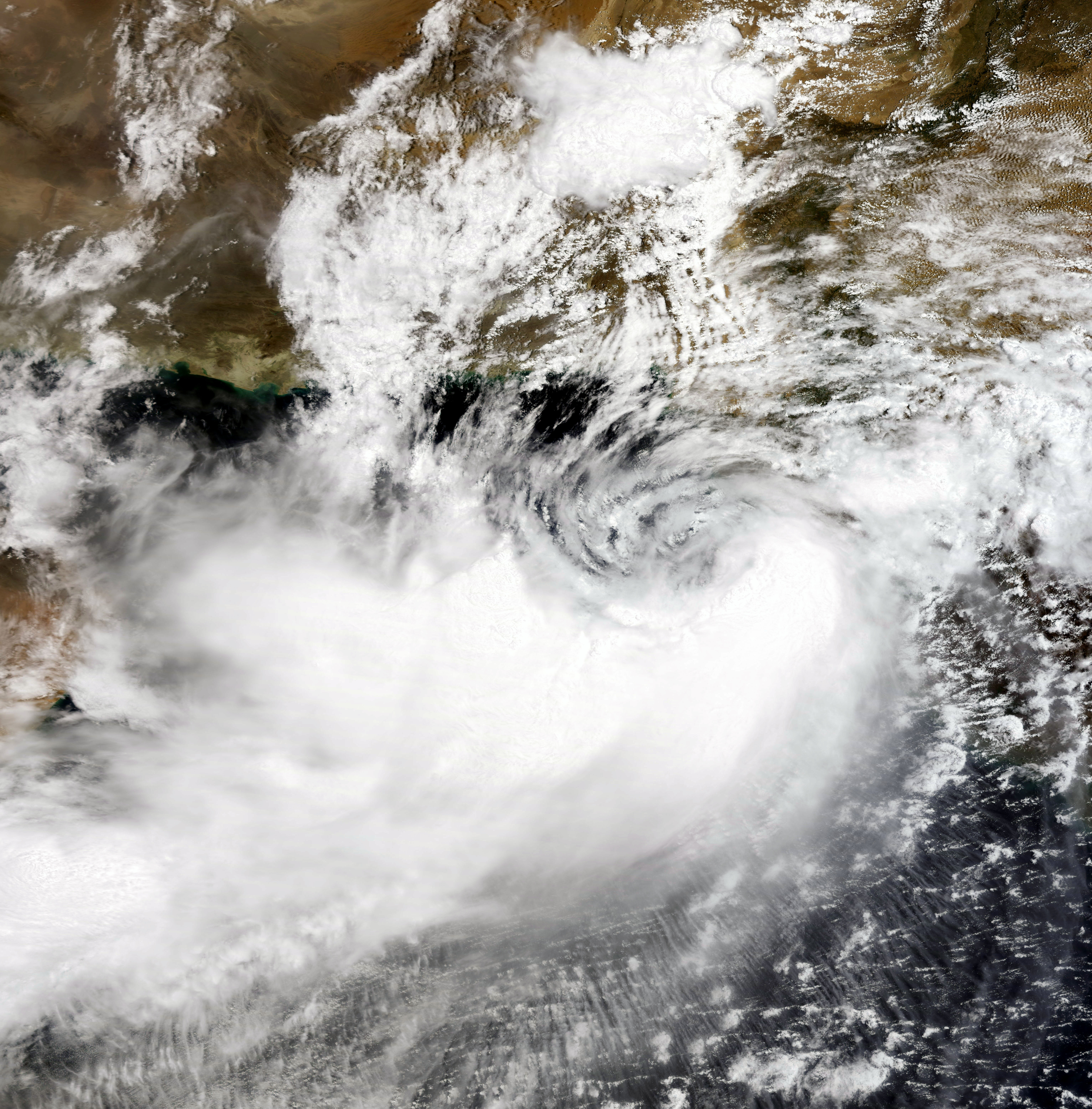
A cyclone system entering in Pakistan, 2007.

The Pakistan Meteorological Department is headed by the Director General. The Department is further divided into several directorates as follows:

- Institute of Meteorology & Geophysics, Karachi (IMG)
- Tropical Cyclone Warning Center, Karachi (TCWC)
- National Seismic Monitoring & Tsunami Early Warning Center, Islamabad (NSMC)
- National Seismic Monitoring Center (Backup Station), Karachi (NSMC)
- Directorate of Maintenance, Karachi
- Meteorological Workshop (MWS), Karachi
- National Meteorological Communication Centre, Karachi (NMCC)
- Directorate of Forecasting and Climatology, Karachi (F&C)
- Climate Data Processing Center, Karachi (CDPC)
- Directorate of Forecasting and Climatology (F&C), Karachi
- Regional Meteorological Centers of each Province :-
  - Karachi Regional Meteorological Center (RMC-Karachi)
  - Lahore Regional Meteorological Center (RMC-Lahore)
  - Peshawar Regional Meteorological Center (RMC-Peshawar)
  - Quetta Regional Meteorological Center (RMC-Quetta)
  - Gilgit Regional Meteorological Center (RMC-GB)
- Dept. of Remote Sensing, Islamabad
- National Agromet Center, Islamabad (NAMC)
- Lai Nullah Flood Early Warning Center, Islamabad
- Drought Monitoring & Early Warning Center (NDMC), Islamabad
- Flood Forecasting Division, Lahore (FFD)
- Geophysical Centre, Quetta
- Research & Development, Islamabad (R&D)
- National Weather Forecasting Centre, Islamabad (NWFC)
- Main Analysis Centre, Karachi (MAC)
- Aviation Meteorological Offices (MO) :-
  - Jinnah International Airport, Karachi
  - Faisalabad International Airport
  - Islamabad International Airport
  - Allama Iqbal International Airport, Lahore
  - Bacha Khan International Airport, Peshawar
  - Quetta International Airport
- Chief Administrative Office (CAO)

== Observatories ==
The Pakistan Meteorological Department established and expanded its network of meteorological observatories across Pakistan since 1947. As of 2017, there are 111 meteorological, airborne and astronomical observatories:

- 47 observatories in Punjab & Islamabad Capital Territory.
- 13 observatories in Gilgit Baltistan and Azad Jammu & Kashmir
- 17 observatories in Khyber Pakhtunkhwa
- 18 observatories in Sindh
- 16 observatories in Balochistan

== Weather stations ==
Some weather stations have limited reporting times, while other report continuously, mainly Pakistan Air Force and Army Aviation Corps stations where a staffed meteorological office is provided for military operations. There is list of weather stations below:

- Karachi, Sindh — The meteorological office at Jinnah International Airport works in close coordination with the Civil Aviation Authority (CAA). Additional weather stations are situated at PAF Base Masroor.
- Lahore, Punjab — The meteorological office is located at Allama Iqbal International Airport while several airborne observatories are located in Shahi Qilla, Misri Shah, Upper Mall and Shahdara.
- Islamabad, Capital Territory — A weather station is situated at Islamabad International Airport meteorological office and several observatories are located at Zero Point, Saidpur, Margalla Hills and Golra Sharif in the west.
- Rawalpindi, Punjab — A weather station is situated at Pakistan Air Force Base Nur Khan Chaklala, while the meteorological office and observatory are located at Dhamial Army Airbase. A complete staffed weather station is also situated at Shamasabad in North Rawalpindi and in Bokra.

== Weather surveillance radars & Lightning Detectors 'LDN' ==
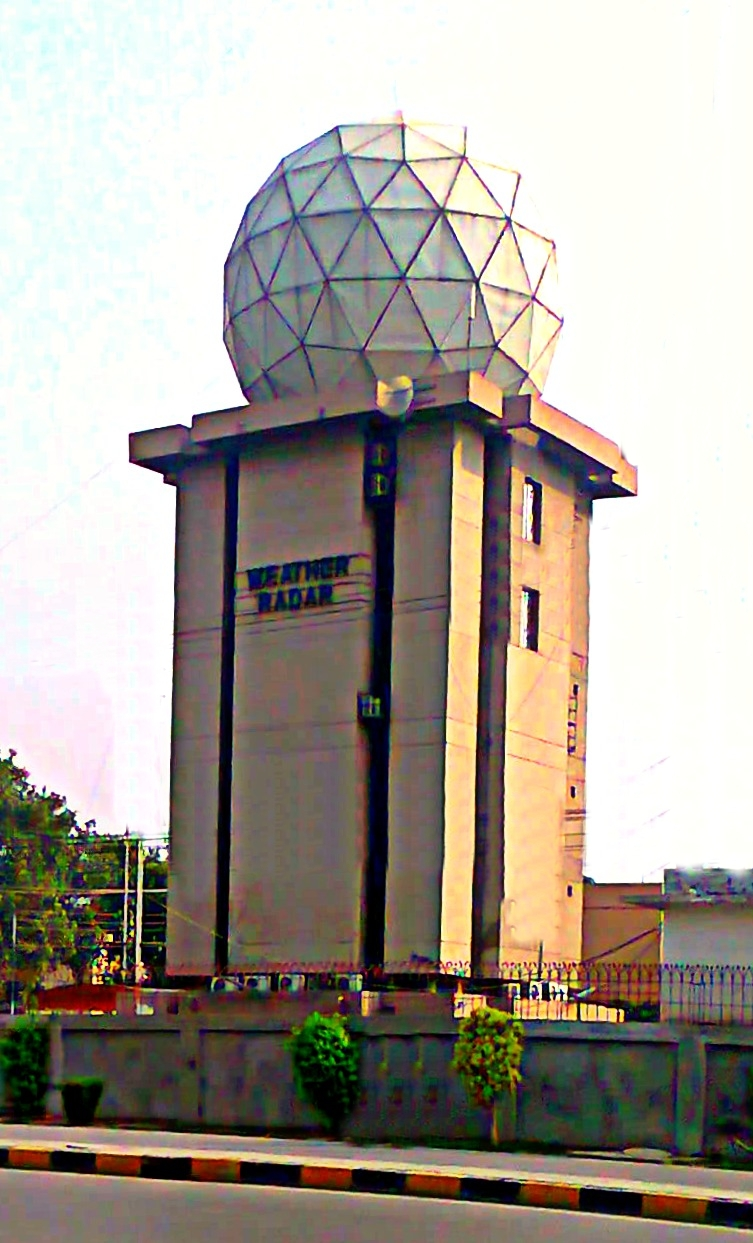
Weather Radar of Lahore.

Weather surveillance radars are located in various cities which provide the weather coverage of the entire country. The main weather radars stations are located in Islamabad and Karachi. These radars are equipped with the state-of-the-art technologies.

== Pakistan Journal of Meteorology ==
From 2004 to 2018, the Research & Development Division published 28 issues of a peer reviewed scientific journal, the Pakistan Journal of Meteorology (PJM). The semi-annual PJM, which accepted submissions from scientists across the world, was:

...an international journal on the Dynamics, Physics and Chemistry of the atmosphere and with papers across the full range of the atmospheric sciences... [covering] achievements and developments not only in the field of meteorology but also in other disciplines like Agrometeorology, Hydrology, Biometeorology, Seismology, Remote Sensing, Climate dynamics and variability, Weather Systems and Numerical Weather Prediction, Global warming and Climate change.

== See also ==
- World Meteorological Organization
- Geological Survey of Pakistan
- List of extreme weather records in Pakistan
- National Institute of Oceanography (Pakistan)
- Space and Upper Atmosphere Research Commission
