= Climate of Quetta =

Quetta, Pakistan features a continental semi-arid climate with a large variation between summer and winter temperatures. The highest temperature recorded in Quetta was 42 °C (108 °F) on 10 July 1998. The lowest temperature in Quetta is −18.3 °C (−0.9 °F), which was recorded on 8 January 1970.

Summer starts in late May and continues until early September, with average temperatures ranging from 24 °C (75 °F) to 26 °C (79 °F). Autumn starts in late September and continues until mid-November, with average temperatures of 12 °C (54 °F) to 18 °C (64 °F). Winter starts in late November and ends in late March, with average temperatures near 4 °C (39 °F) to 5 °C (41 °F). Spring starts in early April and ends in late May, with average temperatures close to 15 °C (59 °F). Unlike most of Pakistan, however, Quetta does not have a monsoon of sustained, heavy rainfall. The highest rainfall during a 24-hour period is 113 millimetres (4.4 in) recorded on 17 December 2000; the highest monthly rainfall is 232.4 millimetres (9.15 in), which was recorded in March 1982; and the highest annual rainfall recorded is 949.8 millimetres (37.39 in) in 1982. A lot of precipitation in winter is snow, falling mostly in December, January and February.

Climate data for Quetta (1991–2020 normals)
Month	Jan	Feb	Mar	Apr	May	Jun	Jul	Aug	Sep	Oct	Nov	Dec	Year
Record high °C (°F)	23.6 (74.5)	26.7 (80.1)	31.5 (88.7)	35.4 (95.7)	39.4 (102.9)	41.5 (106.7)	42.0 (107.6)	40.6 (105.1)	38.3 (100.9)	34.0 (93.2)	36.0 (96.8)	25.0 (77.0)	42.0 (107.6)
Mean daily maximum °C (°F)	11.8 (53.2)	14.0 (57.2)	19.5 (67.1)	25.9 (78.6)	31.4 (88.5)	35.5 (95.9)	36.8 (98.2)	35.4 (95.7)	31.9 (89.4)	26.0 (78.8)	19.6 (67.3)	14.6 (58.3)	25.2 (77.4)
Daily mean °C (°F)	4.8 (40.6)	7.1 (44.8)	12.5 (54.5)	17.9 (64.2)	23.0 (73.4)	27.3 (81.1)	29.2 (84.6)	27.5 (81.5)	22.8 (73.0)	16.5 (61.7)	11.0 (51.8)	6.5 (43.7)	17.2 (62.9)
Mean daily minimum °C (°F)	−1.9 (28.6)	0.3 (32.5)	5.1 (41.2)	10.0 (50.0)	14.6 (58.3)	19.0 (66.2)	21.6 (70.9)	19.7 (67.5)	13.6 (56.5)	7.0 (44.6)	1.9 (35.4)	−1.4 (29.5)	9.1 (48.4)
Record low °C (°F)	−18.3 (−0.9)	−16.7 (1.9)	−8.3 (17.1)	−3.9 (25.0)	−0.3 (31.5)	5.0 (41.0)	8.9 (48.0)	3.3 (37.9)	−0.6 (30.9)	−8.3 (17.1)	−13.3 (8.1)	−18.3 (−0.9)	−18.3 (−0.9)
Average precipitation mm (inches)	55.0 (2.17)	58.4 (2.30)	49.5 (1.95)	40.0 (1.57)	17.8 (0.70)	3.2 (0.13)	8.8 (0.35)	4.9 (0.19)	4.2 (0.17)	4.5 (0.18)	19.3 (0.76)	34.6 (1.36)	300.2 (11.83)
Average snowfall cm (inches)	22 (8.7)	17 (6.6)	3.0 (1.2)	0 (0)	0 (0)	0 (0)	0 (0)	0 (0)	0 (0)	0 (0)	0.51 (0.2)	14 (5.4)	56.51 (22.1)
Average precipitation days (≥ 1.0 mm)	5.0	5.7	5.4	4.1	1.7	0.7	0.8	0.8	0.4	0.6	1.7	2.7	29.6
Average relative humidity (%)	63	59	54	50	43	36	43	42	39	40	47	56	48
Mean monthly sunshine hours	220.1	209.0	232.5	273.0	334.8	327.0	313.1	313.1	294.0	306.9	279.0	238.7	3,341.2
Mean daily sunshine hours	7.1	7.4	7.5	9.1	10.8	10.9	10.1	10.1	9.8	9.9	9.3	7.7	9.1
Source 1: NOAA, Hong Kong Observatory (altitude: 1589 m) (only snow inch, sun)
Source 2: PMD, Deutscher Wetterdienst (humidity 1951-1967)

== Monthly climate cycle ==
The monthly breakup of the weather in Quetta is as follows:

=== January ===
January is the coldest month in Quetta, and Western Disturbance causes rainfall with occasional snowfall in the city. The highest temperature on record 23.6 °C (74.5 °F) on 28 January 1987; and the lowest temperature is −18.3 °C (−0.9 °F), recorded on 8 January 1970. The highest monthly rainfall recorded was 178 millimetres (7.0 in) in 1982; while the most rain in a 24-hours period was 69 millimetres (2.7 in) on 30 January 1982.

January is the most probable month for snow. Western disturbances are at the peak of their season, and the combination of wintriness makes this month most suitable for the season's heavy snow. All the decades of this month are crucial for the snow to fall. During the past years, the city have seen some record snowfalls during this month. On 14 and 15 January 2017 Quetta received heaviest snow of last 10 years with 2 feet of snow recorded in some areas.

=== February ===
The weather in February is somewhat similar to that of January: generally cold, with Western Disturbance causing rains and snowfall. The highest temperature ever recorded was 26.6 °C (79.9 °F) on 16 February 2002, and lowest temperature was −16.7 °C (1.9 °F) on 1 February 1970. While the highest monthly rainfall is 189.2 millimetres (7.45 in) in 1982; The heaviest rainfall in 24 hours was 54 millimetres (2.1 in) on 17 February 2003.

On 28 February 2011 heavy hailstorms lashed the valley followed by heavy rainfall. A total of 126 millimetres (5.0 in) of rainfall was recorded during February 2011, which is the third-highest rain in February after the record 189.2 millimetres (7.45 in) of rain in 1982 and 141 millimetres (5.6 in) in 2003.

The probability of falling snow in this month is high; every year the city receives light to moderate snow during the month mostly during the first two weeks of the month; however, there are chances of snow even in the last week of the month.

=== March ===
March is the wettest month of the city, and remains cool, but towards the end of the month becomes warmer. Western Disturbances continues to affect the weather, producing hailstorms and causing rains with strong winds, and the chances of snowfall on the mountains around the city, and occasional chances of snowfall in the city mostly during the first three weeks of the month. The likelihood of thunderstorms is very high during the month, with the possibility of some incredible thunders in the city followed by heavy downpour.

On 8 March 2007 light snowfall occurred in the city. The highest temperature for the month of March was 32.5 °C (90.5 °F) on 31 March 2018, while the lowest was −8.3 °C (17.1 °F) on 12 March 1973. The highest monthly rainfall recorded was 232.4 millimetres (9.15 in) in 1982; the heaviest rain in a 24-hour period was 75 millimetres (3.0 in) on 31 March 1985. A western wave entered Balochistan on 2 March 2019 which caused flash flooding in the province including Quetta the city which received 137 mm of rain along with snowfall recorded 4 cm. On 1 March 2024 A Cold Front With Western Disturbance Continues to effect Quetta city cause 9mm of rain along with light snowfall from 2 March night till 3 March Night Temperature Drop to minus -5.2 recorded on Personal Weather Station In Eastern Bypass Area..

=== April ===
Thunderstorms persist during the first decade of the month, and continue intermittently during the second and third decades. The weather in April is similar to the weather of March. The highest temperature recorded was 35 °C (95 °F) on 27 April 1979, and lowest temperature was −3.9 °C (25.0 °F) on 2 April 1965. The highest monthly rainfall was 158.7 millimetres (6.25 in) in 1992. the heaviest rainfall in a 24-hour period was 49 millimetres (1.9 in) on 12 April 1983.

In April 2011, Quetta saw two major wet spells, the first one commenced from 7 to 12 April, while the second one started from 14 to 17 April intermittently. During the period, the city was battered by heavy rainfalls and thunderstorms. On 16 April, lightning killed one person and injured three persons near Pashtoon street in Brawrey. In April 2011, Quetta received 42 millimetres (1.7 in) of rain, which is highest monthly rainfall in April since 2000. In 2024, strong western disturbances continued to affect North Balochistan including Quetta which lead to a new highest monthly rainfall record of 188.6mm. A western Disturbance Cause Rains Along With Hails From 12 To 15 April And Lead to New 24 Hours High Rain Record of 59.2mm on 14/04/2024 on PWS in Eastern Bypass Quetta

=== May ===
In May, the weather becomes hotter. The highest temperature was 39.4 °C (102.9 °F) on 11 May 2000, and the lowest was −0.3 °C (31.5 °F) on 3 May 1989. Humidity levels decline as compared to other months. The highest monthly rainfall recorded was 39.9 millimetres (1.57 in) in 1963; and the heaviest rainfall recorded in a 24-hour period was 28 millimetres (1.1 in) on 25 May 2003. On 2 May 2005, a storm covered the entire city with a blanket of dust that lasted for many days.

=== June ===
In June, temperatures continue to increase. Temperatures can reach 40 °C (104 °F), with the highest on record at 41.5 °C (106.7 °F) on 4 June 2005, and on four other occasions. The lowest temperature was 6 °C (43 °F) on 14 June 1979.

In 2007, Cyclone Yemyin hit the coastal areas of Balochistan, and caused rains in most parts of the province, including Quetta producing a record breaking 61 millimetres (2.4 in) of rain between 22 June to 30. The heaviest rainfall in a 24-hour period of 20 millimetres (0.79 in) was recorded on 29 June 2007.

On 27 June 2016 a cloudburst occurred in the afternoon. As a result of this cloudburst 50 mm (Quetta Samungli) rain fell in one and a half-hour with big size hail stones, while 8 mm was recorded at Quetta (Sheikh Manda).

=== July ===
July is the hottest month in Quetta. Since Quetta lies partially outside the belt of the monsoon, the effect thereof is seldom visible in the city. However, sometimes if monsoon gets strong enough, then Quetta can also have some rains. The highest temperature recorded in the month was 46 °C (115 °F) in July 2014, while the lowest temperature was 10.6 °C (51.1 °F) on 11 July 1977. and the highest rainfall for this month is 121.8 millimetres (4.80 in) in 1978; On 14 July 2006 a severe dust storm hit the Quetta valley for three consecutive days, reducing visibility to less than a kilometer. Again on 23 July 2007, another dust storm enveloped the city and its surroundings, reducing visibility to less than a kilometer but also affected both air and vehicle traffic.

=== August ===
August is also a hot month in Quetta, with a highest temperature recorded of 40.6 °C (105.1 °F) on 9 August 1970; conversely the lowest temperature was 3.9 °C (39.0 °F) on 29 August 1972. The heaviest monthly rainfall recorded was 283.1 millimetres (11.15 in) in 2022, when it continuously rained heavily for 30 hours on 25 and 26 of the month cutting off the city from the rest of the country, the whole city went into total blackout and was left in the rain without proper gas supply. The heavy rainfall resulted in major flooding taking down with it multiple lives and their precious homes and livestock. The heaviest rainfall in 24 hours was 102 millimetres (4.0 in) on 3 August 1983. On 6 August 2013 a severe rain storm with heavy downpour lash Quetta city, consequently at least two people died while several houses damaged in Nawan Kali area of the city, dozens of mud houses were destroyed in the rain while several trees and signboards were uprooted. Moreover, at least five people, including three kids, sustained injuries when roof of a house collapsed. City roads were submerged under rain water caused severe traffic jams. Meanwhile, 220 kV transmission line tripped due to heavy rain and storm, disrupting electricity to 17 districts of the province including Quetta. According to Pakistan Meteorological Department 12 millimetres (0.47 in) of rainfall was recorded during one and half-hour rainfall.

=== September ===
In September, the weather remains hot, but gets cooler towards the last week of the month. It is one of the driest months in the city. The highest recorded temperature was 39.3 °C (102.7 °F) on 16 September 2016, and lowest was −0.6 °C (30.9 °F) on 30 September 1962. with the heaviest rainfall for a 24-hour period standing at 28 millimetres (1.1 in) on 5 September 1994. On 8 September 2008, a dust storm covered the entire city, and lasted for many days.

In 2011, a spell of monsoon rains produced widespread heavy rains in Sindh and northeastern parts of Balochistan. The weather system produced unusual record breaking rains in Quetta that broke the record for highest monthly rainfall of 62 millimetres (2.4 in), recorded in 1994. On 3 September, 33 millimetres (1.3 in) rain was recorded again on 5 September, 45 millimetres (1.8 in) of rain was recorded. In September 2011, 85 millimetres (3.3 in) of rain was recorded.

=== October ===
October is the driest month in the city, with a record highest monthly rainfall of 68.8 millimetres (2.71 in) in 1982; and a 24-hour record of 30 millimetres (1.2 in) on 19 October 1982. The highest and lowest temperatures are 34 °C (93 °F) on 1 October 1998 and −6.7 °C (19.9 °F) on 27 October 1964, respectively. In October 2011 the city received its second highest rainfall of 31.1 millimetres (1.22 in).

=== November ===
Winter begins in November, as the Western Disturbance returns with rain and possibly snow over the mountains. The highest and lowest temperatures recorded for the month were 36 °C (97 °F) on 3 November 1998 and −13.3 °C (8.1 °F) on 30 November 1964, respectively. On 14 November 2008, the minimum temperature recorded was −8 °C (18 °F) as the Quetta valley, and major parts of Balochistan, were in the grip of a cold front for several days.

The heaviest rainfall recorded was 30 millimetres (1.2 in) for a 24-hour period on 16 November 2003. While the heaviest rainfall for the month was 72 millimetres (2.8 in) in 2006;

=== December ===
December is typically a chilly month. Western Disturbances begin to cause rain and snowfall. The heaviest rainfall for the month was 162 millimetres (6.4 in) in 1982;, and the heaviest rainfall for 24-hours was recorded at 113 millimetres (4.4 in) on 17 December 2000. The highest and lowest temperatures recorded were 25 °C (77 °F) on 14 December 1970 and −16.7 °C (1.9 °F) on 12 December 1964, respectively.

December is the wettest month of the city during the winter season. The rainfall intensity gains strength during the last third of the month, but rainfall may occur earlier. There are fair chances of snowfall most probably during the last third. Light snowfall occurred on 9 December 2015 in Quetta.

In 2010, Quetta saw its record lowest monthly mean minimum for December since 2000 of −7 °C (19 °F). The severe cold wave started on 28 November 2010 and continued till 17 January 2011. Pakistan Meteorological Department had forecasted in their Weather Advisory that during the coming period, mercury level may reach −12 °C (10 °F). However at the peak of the severe cold wave the temperature dropped to −9 °C (16 °F) for consecutive four days, from 9 to 12 December 2010. On the whole the temperature ranges between −5 °C (23 °F) to −9 °C (16 °F) during the severe cold wave.

== Cold front ==
Quetta is one of the coldest places in Balochistan and Pakistan. The lowest temperature of −18.3 °C (−0.9 °F) in the history of Quetta was recorded on 8 January 1970. Every year during winter season temperatures reaches near −10 °C (14 °F), while temperatures below −15 °C (5 °F) are not uncommon. For many consecutive years, the city had experienced a temperature below −14 °C (7 °F) several times.

The Pakistan Meteorological Department's recording of severe cold weather since 1960 are recorded below:

History of severe cold wave in Quetta
Temperature below −10 °C (14 °F) recorded in Quetta since 1960
Year	Date	Temperature	References
1962	30 November	−13.3 °C (8.1 °F)	
1964	12 December	−16.7 °C (1.9 °F)	
1970	8 January	−18.3 °C (−0.9 °F)	
1970	1 February	−16.7 °C (1.9 °F)	
1973	28 January	−11 °C (12 °F)	
1976	9 December	−10 °C (14 °F)	
1978	27 December	−11 °C (12 °F)	
1980	5 February	−12 °C (10 °F)	
1984	20 February	−11.3 °C (11.7 °F)	
1984	21 February	−10.8 °C (12.6 °F)	
1984	22 December	−10 °C (14 °F)	
1984	23 December	−11 °C (12 °F)	
1984	24 December	−11 °C (12 °F)	
1986	13 December	−11 °C (12 °F)	
1986	14 December	−12.2 °C (10.0 °F)	
1986	16 December	−10.5 °C (13.1 °F)	
1987	3 December	−10 °C (14 °F)	
1994	10 January	−10.5 °C (13.1 °F)	
1994	10 December	−11.5 °C (11.3 °F)	
1988	20 February	−10.5 °C (13.1 °F)	
2001	2 February	−10.1 °C (13.8 °F)	
2006	4 January	−12.5 °C (9.5 °F)	
2006	5 January	−12.5 °C (9.5 °F)	
2006	6 January	−12.5 °C (9.5 °F)	
2006	7 January	−11.1 °C (12.0 °F)	
2007	4 January	−14 °C (7 °F)	
2008	6 January	−11 °C (12 °F)	
2008	5 February	−15 °C (5 °F)	
2008	8 February	−10 °C (14 °F)	
2010	10 February	−10 °C (14 °F)	
2010	31 December	−10 °C (14 °F)	
2011	1 January	−10 °C (14 °F)	
2011	22 December	−11 °C (12 °F)	
2012	8 January	−11 °C (12 °F)	
2013	4 January	−11 °C (12 °F)	
2013	17 January	−11 °C (12 °F)	
2013	30 December	−13 °C (9 °F)	

=== Snowfall ===
Quetta usually receives snow in December, January, and February, though it is not unusual to have a snowfall as late as March. During the drought of 1998–2002, Quetta did not receive any snowfall; while in 2004, 2005, and 2008 it snowed only once in the year. In 2004 and 2008, the city received heavy snow twice after a hiatus of fifteen years.

On 31 December 2004 Quetta received more than one foot of snow for the first time in fifteen years, though in 2006, 2007 and 2009 the city did not get snow. On 29 January 2008, Quetta had four inches in four hours, a few days later, on 2 February 2008, Quetta received more than one foot of snow in just 10 hours. During the winter of 2010, there was no snowfall due to the El-Nino weather system over Pakistan.

The major snowfalls in Quetta since 2000 are:

- On 18 February 2003 Quetta received 6 inches of snowfall for the first time since the drought hit the province in 1998.
- On 29 January 2004 Quetta received heavy snowfall after a long period of five years.
- On 31 December 2004 Quetta received more than one foot of snowfall after fifteen years.
- On 29 January 2008 Quetta received more than four inches of snowfall in four hours.
- On 2 February 2008 Quetta received more than one foot of snow in just 10 hours.
- On 12 February 2009, Quetta received heavy snowfall.
- On 21 January 2012, Quetta received more than one 6 inches of snow till night.
- On 22 January 2012, Quetta received more than 8 inches of snow.
- On 24 January 2012, Quetta received more than 2 inches of snow.
- On 30 January 2012, Quetta received more than 2 inches of snow.
- On 17 February 2012, Quetta received more than 2 inches of snow.
- On 8 January 2014, Quetta received one foot of snow.
- On 14 January 2017 Quetta received 5 inches of snow
- On 15 January 2017 some areas of Quetta received 2 feet of snow from 4 am to 9 am.

== Annual rainfall ==
The average annual rainfall for Quetta is 312.9 millimetres (12.32 in). The city mainly receives rain from the west during the winter season, from November till the end of March. In 2003, the city received light snowfall of 6 inches for the first time since the drought hit the province in 1998. In 2004 and 2005, Quetta received normal rains with snow falling two times in January 2004 and December 2004 and light snow in 2005. While in 2006 Quetta received almost normal rainfalls although above normal rains in July and August. The rainfall in 2007 was also normal while received record-breaking monthly rainfall of 61 millimetres (2.4 in) in June. In 2008 Quetta received normal rains with snow falling two times in January and February. In 2009 Quetta received the heaviest annual rainfall since 2000, a total of 320.4 millimetres (12.61 in) of rain fell with no snow was recorded except the traces of snowfall in February. In 2010 the city received below normal rains of just 104 millimetres (4.1 in), the lowest since 2001.

The annual rainfall since 1982, based on data from Pakistan Meteorological Department:

Year	Rainfall	Notes	References
1982	949.8 mm (37.39 in)	The highest annual rainfall ever recorded in Quetta.	
1991	360 mm (14 in)		
1992	349 mm (13.7 in)		
1993	190 mm (7.5 in)		
1994	225 mm (8.9 in)		
1995	290 mm (11 in)		
1996	155 mm (6.1 in)		
1997	305 mm (12.0 in)		
1998	152 mm (6.0 in)		
1999	150 mm (5.9 in)		
2000	60 mm (2.4 in)		
2001	80 mm (3.1 in)		
2002	115 mm (4.5 in)		
2003	219 mm (8.6 in)	*Data of Oct, Nov & Dec not available. 6 Inch Snowfall recorded.	
2004	105.9 mm (4.17 in)	More than 16 Inches of snowfall recorded, after a long period of five years	
2005	310.5 mm (12.22 in)		
2006	223 mm (8.8 in)	*Data of Sept & Oct not available	
2007	284 mm (11.2 in)		
2008	138 mm (5.4 in)	More than 14 Inches of snowfall recorded	
2009	317 mm (12.5 in)		
2010	104 mm (4.1 in)		
2011	437.6 mm (17.23 in)		
2012	265.7 mm (10.46 in)	More than 20 Inches of Snowfall recorded, heaviest snowfall since 1996.	
2013	316.7 mm (12.47 in)	More than one foot of Snowfall recorded.	
2014	2.4 mm (0.094 in)	As of 19 January 2014.	
2015			
2016	60 mm (2.4 in)	As of 27 June 2016.	

== Drought ==
Quetta was affected by a severe drought spell resulted from very low rainfall in the winter season of 1998. The La-Nina phenomena was responsible for below normal rains Balochistan including Quetta city from 1998, after diminishing in December 2000 it was reappeared, and lasted till March 2001 after that it faded gradually in the next few months. During the severe drought North Balochistan received about 30% less rain while South Balochistan received 50–60% less than normal rain.

At the peak of the drought in 2000, the city received just 60 millimetres (2.4 in) of rainfall, while almost no rainfall or snowfall was observed in winter season. The drought enveloped the whole country and resulted in 30% below normal rains in Pakistan. At least 1.2 million people in Balochistan were affected by drought, and over 100 died, mostly because of dehydration, according to the government sources.

== Pakistan Meteorological Departments in Quetta ==
- Regional Met. Centre, Quetta
- Geophysical Centre, Quetta

== See also ==
- Climate of Pakistan
- Climate of Gwadar
- List of extreme weather records in Pakistan
- 2011 Balochistan floods
