= Climate of Gwadar =

Coordinates: 25°07′35″N 62°19′21″E

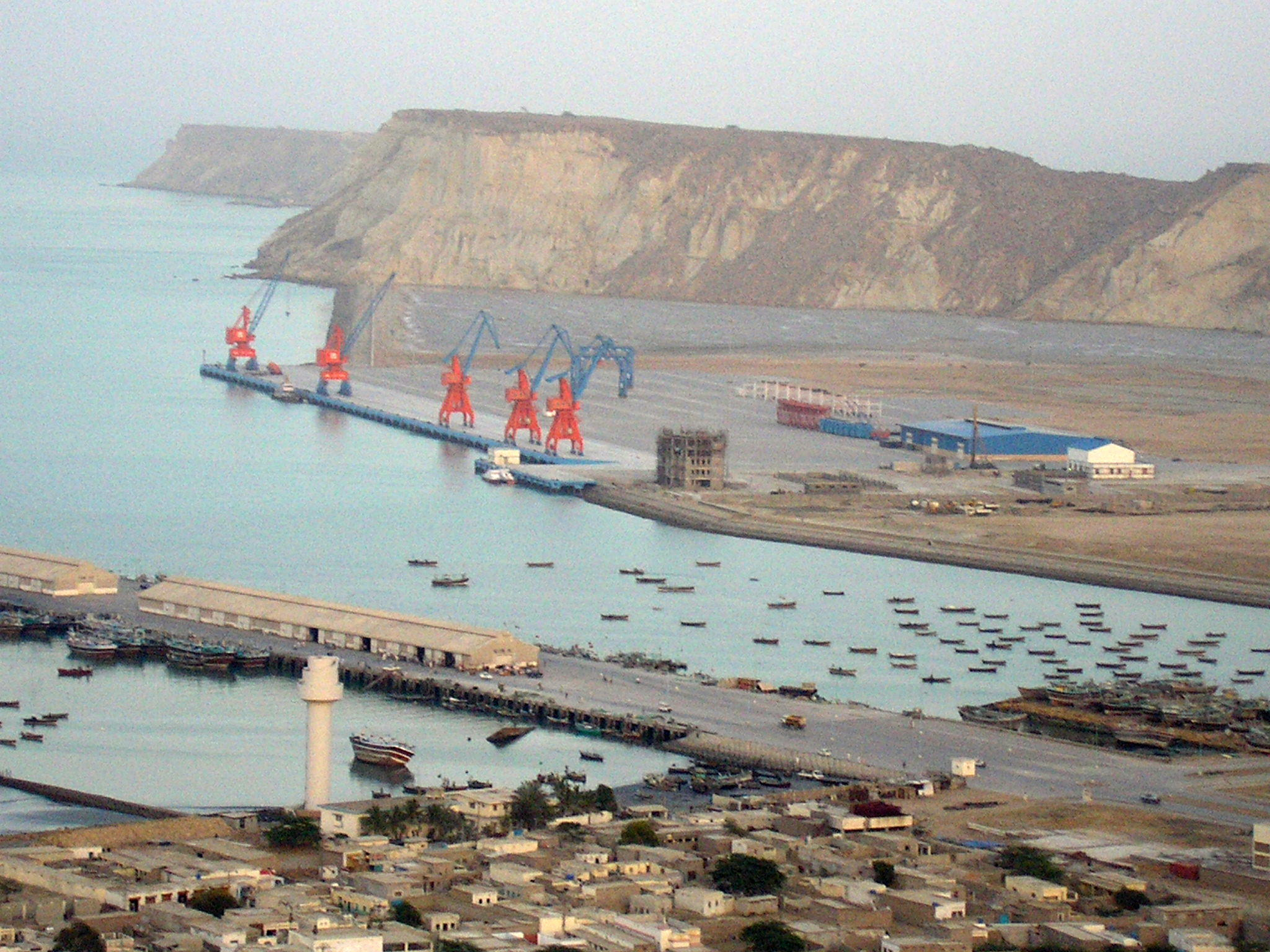
Port city of Gwadar

Gwadar is located at 0 metres (0 ft)–300 metres (984 ft) meters above sea level and features a dry and hot arid climate. The oceanic influence keeps the temperature lower than that in the summer and higher in winter. The mean temperature in the hottest month of June remains between 31 °C (88 °F) and 32 °C (90 °F). The mean temperature in the coldest month of January varies from 18 °C (64 °F) to 19 °C (66 °F). The uniformity of temperature is a unique characteristic of the coastal region in Balochistan. Occasionally, winds moving down the Balochistan plateau bring cold spells, otherwise the winter is pleasant. In Gwadar, winter is shorter than summer. Gwadar's weather is identical to that of the Middle East as most rain occurs from December till January. The highest rainfall of 227 millimetres (8.9 in) in 24 hours was recorded on 6 June 2010.

Climate data for Gwadar, Pakistan
Month	Jan	Feb	Mar	Apr	May	Jun	Jul	Aug	Sep	Oct	Nov	Dec	Year
Record high °C (°F)	31.1 (88.0)	33.0 (91.4)	40.5 (104.9)	44.7 (112.5)	45.7 (114.3)	48 (118)	42.5 (108.5)	39.5 (103.1)	41.1 (106.0)	41.0 (105.8)	37 (99)	33.1 (91.6)	48.0 (118.4)
Mean daily maximum °C (°F)	24.1 (75.4)	25 (77)	28 (82)	31.9 (89.4)	34.2 (93.6)	34 (93)	32.5 (90.5)	31.5 (88.7)	31.5 (88.7)	32 (90)	29 (84)	25 (77)	29.89 (85.80)
Mean daily minimum °C (°F)	13.8 (56.8)	15.1 (59.2)	18.4 (65.1)	21.7 (71.1)	24.9 (76.8)	26.9 (80.4)	26.9 (80.4)	25.8 (78.4)	24.4 (75.9)	21.7 (71.1)	18.0 (64.4)	15.1 (59.2)	21.05 (69.89)
Record low °C (°F)	2.3 (36.1)	1.3 (34.3)	8.0 (46.4)	12.5 (54.5)	15.5 (59.9)	20.0 (68.0)	20.8 (69.4)	18.6 (65.5)	18.0 (64.4)	13.0 (55.4)	5.5 (41.9)	0.5 (32.9)	0.5 (32.9)
Average precipitation mm (inches)	25.9 (1.02)	22.7 (0.89)	13.4 (0.53)	4.9 (0.19)	0.1 (0.00)	2.4 (0.09)	6.6 (0.26)	2.8 (0.11)	0.2 (0.01)	0.9 (0.04)	3.7 (0.15)	21.6 (0.85)	89.8 (3.54)

== Factors ==
Gwadar being near the Arabian peninsula has hot and dry weather almost all-year round. The following are the main factors that influence the weather over Gwadar.

- Western Disturbances generally occur during the summer months and cause moderate to above-moderate rainfall, temperatures also decrease due to it.
- Shamal winds mostly occur during the months of April till May, these winds are quite dusty and are stronger in the morning than at night.
- Continental air prevails during the period when there is no precipitation in the city.

== Monthly weather conditions ==
The following is the monthly summary of climatic conditions in Gwadar.

=== January ===
January is the coldest month of the city with the lowest temperature of 2.3 °C (36.1 °F) recorded on 31 January 2001 while the highest temperature was 31.1 °C (88.0 °F) recorded on 30 January 1963. Western Disturbance plays a vital role in the weather of Gwadar as most winter rains are dumped by it. Gwadar being close to the border of Iran gets moderate to above moderate rain during this month as Western disturbances are strong near the western borders of Pakistan. The highest rain for this month was 199.1 millimetres (7.84 in) recorded in 1970 while the average is 25.9 millimetres (1.02 in). The heaviest rain in 24 hours occurred on 13 January 1970 at 99 millimetres (3.9 in).

=== February ===
February is also very chilly in the city with the lowest temperature of 1.2 °C (34.2 °F) recorded on 1 February 2001 while the highest temperature was 33 °C (91 °F) recorded on 27 February 2008. Moderate intensity rains also occur during this month. The highest monthly rainfall of 265.7 millimetres (10.46 in) was recorded in 1986 with an average of 22.7 millimetres (0.89 in), while the heaviest 24-hour rainfall was 145.8 millimetres (5.74 in) recorded on 21 February 1987. On February 25, 2024, a powerful Western Disturbance began affecting the coast of Balochistan. Rain continued for three days in Gwadar, with over 150mm recorded by 2:00 PM on February 27, 2024.

=== March ===
Hot and dry weather is main factor of this month with highest temperature of 40.1 °C (104.2 °F) recorded on 29 March 1999, while lowest temperature of 8 °C (46 °F) recorded on 4 March 2003. Rain is a rare in this month with average rainfall of 15 millimetres (0.59 in) while the highest for this month is 129 millimetres (5.1 in) in 2005 and the heaviest 24-hour rainfall occurred 2 March 2005 which is of 116 millimetres (4.6 in).

=== April ===
Again, hot and dry weather hovers over the city with a slight increase in temperature. The highest temperature of 44.7 °C (112.5 °F) was recorded on 6 April 2001, while the lowest temperature of 12 °C (54 °F) was recorded on 30 April 2004. No rain occurs during this month with an average rainfall of 0.1 millimetres (0.0039 in) while the highest for this month was 73.4 millimetres (2.89 in) in 1961. The heaviest 24-hour rainfall occurred on 14 April 1994 at 50 millimetres (2.0 in).

=== May ===
The weather in May is identical to that of April. The heat wave is the main factor of this month. The highest temperature recorded in the city was 45.7 °C (114.3 °F) on 25 May 1992, while the lowest was 15.5 °C (59.9 °F) recorded on 2 May 2001. There is no rain during this month but drizzles may occur rarely. The highest monthly rainfall of May was 5.4 millimetres (0.21 in) recorded in 1982, while the average rain is 0.5 millimetres (0.020 in) and the heaviest 24-hour rain of May was also 5.4 millimetres (0.21 in) recorded on 2 May 1982.

=== June ===
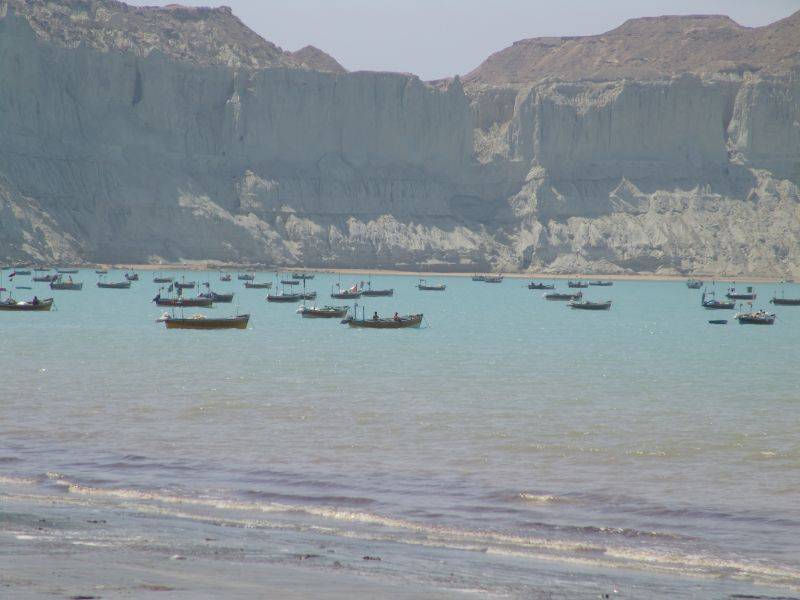
Hills overlooking Gwadar.

June is the hottest month of Gwadar city. The hottest temperature was 48 °C (118 °F) recorded on 8 June 1979, while the lowest temperature was recorded on 2 June 2000 at 20 °C (68 °F). Rains do not occur during this month. If a tropical cyclone that forms in the Arabian Sea approaches Gwadar, then light rains may occur as these cyclones get weak by the time they reach Gwadar. Cyclone Gonu moved past Gwadar with light rain but brought strong winds in early June 2007. On 26 June 2007, Cyclone Yemyin as a weak tropical low made landfall near Gwadar with 36 millimetres (1.4 in) of rain and during the first week of June 2010 Category-1 Cyclone Phet devastated the city with strong windstorms of 120 km/h and a heavy downpour of 372 millimetres (14.6 in) was recorded in two days, with 143 millimetres (5.6 in) recorded on 5 June and a record-breaking 227 millimetres (8.9 in) in 24 hours was recorded on 6 June 2010. Phet's rainfall also made the record for highest monthly rainfall in Gwadar as the average is only 2.4 millimetres (0.094 in).

=== July ===
July is identical to June, the weather remains hot and humid. The highest temperature was 42.5 °C (108.5 °F) recorded on 14 July 1987 while the lowest temperature was 20.8 °C (69.4 °F) recorded on 12 July 2001. Drizzles may occur during this month. The highest rainfall of this month was 99.1 millimetres (3.90 in) in 1979 while the average is 6.6 millimetres (0.26 in) and the highest 24-hour rain in this month was 90 millimetres (3.5 in) which occurred on 25 July 1976.

=== August ===
There is no change in the weather of Gwadar in August as it remains hot and humid but temperatures decrease a little bit. The highest temperature was 39.5 °C (103.1 °F) recorded on 11 August 1962 while the lowest temperature was 20.5 °C (68.9 °F) recorded on 4 August 1999. Drizzles may occur in this month, too. The highest rainfall of this month was 56.5 millimetres (2.22 in) in 1979 while the average is 2.8 millimetres (0.11 in) and the highest 24-hour rain in this month was 32.3 millimetres (1.27 in) which occurred on 22 August 1970.

=== September ===
September is hotter but less humid than August. Nevertheless, temperatures rise in this month. The highest temperature was 41.1 °C (106.0 °F) recorded on 11 September 1962 while the lowest temperature was 18 °C (64 °F) recorded on 26 September 2004. Trace amounts of drizzle may occur in this month. The highest rainfall of this month was 7.4 millimetres (0.29 in) while the average is 0.2 millimetres (0.0079 in) and the highest 24-hour rain in this month was 5.6 millimetres (0.22 in) which occurred on 7 September 1976.

=== October ===
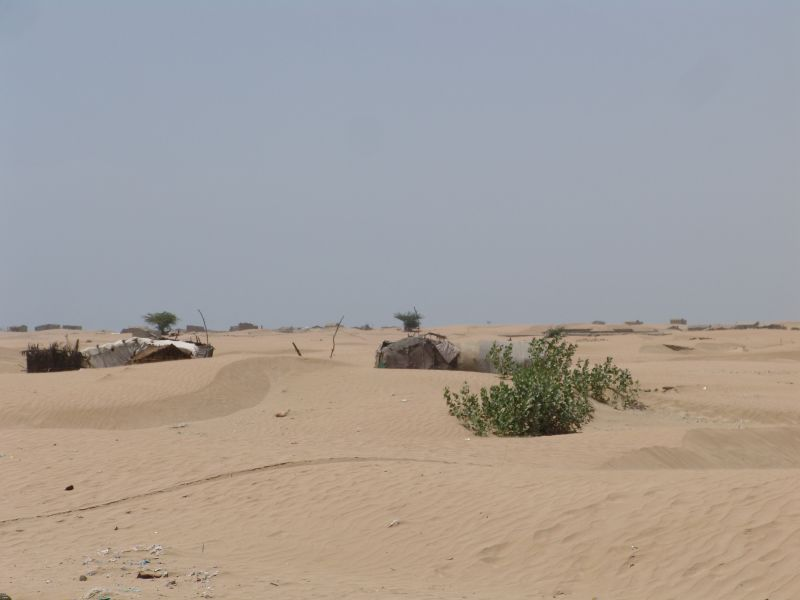
Most of the land in Gwadar is desert.

October is the driest month of the city and it is the month in which autumn visits the city. The highest temperature was 41 °C (106 °F) recorded on 1 October 1999 while the lowest temperature was 13 °C (55 °F) recorded on 23 October 1975. Drizzles may occur in this month. The highest rainfall of this month was 39 millimetres (1.5 in) in 1997 while the average is 0.9 millimetres (0.035 in) and the highest 24-hour rain in this month was 12.4 millimetres (0.49 in) which occurred on 25 October 1997.

=== November ===
The first week of November is hot while the rest is mild with dry weather. The highest temperature was 37.2 °C (99.0 °F) recorded on 1 November 1965 while the lowest temperature was 5.5 °C (41.9 °F) recorded on 27 November 2003. Winter rain showers occur in this month due to Western disturbances. The highest rainfall of this month wa 47 millimetres (1.9 in) in 1963 while the average is 3.7 millimetres (0.15 in) and the highest 24-hour rain in this month was 42 millimetres (1.7 in) which occurred on 24 November 1963.

=== December ===
December is the month in which the cold wave hits the city because Gwadar is close to the sea, making December a mild month. Western disturbances cause heavy showers in this month that decrease the temperature. The highest temperature was 33.1 °C (91.6 °F) recorded on 8 December 2005 while the lowest temperature was 0.5 °C (32.9 °F) recorded on 15 December 2003. Heavy downpours occur in this month. The highest rainfall of this month was 142 millimetres (5.6 in) in 1989 while the average is 21.6 millimetres (0.85 in) and the highest 24-hour rain in this month was 71.2 millimetres (2.80 in) which occurred on 6 December 1997.

== List of Cyclones that effected Gwadar and the Makran coast ==
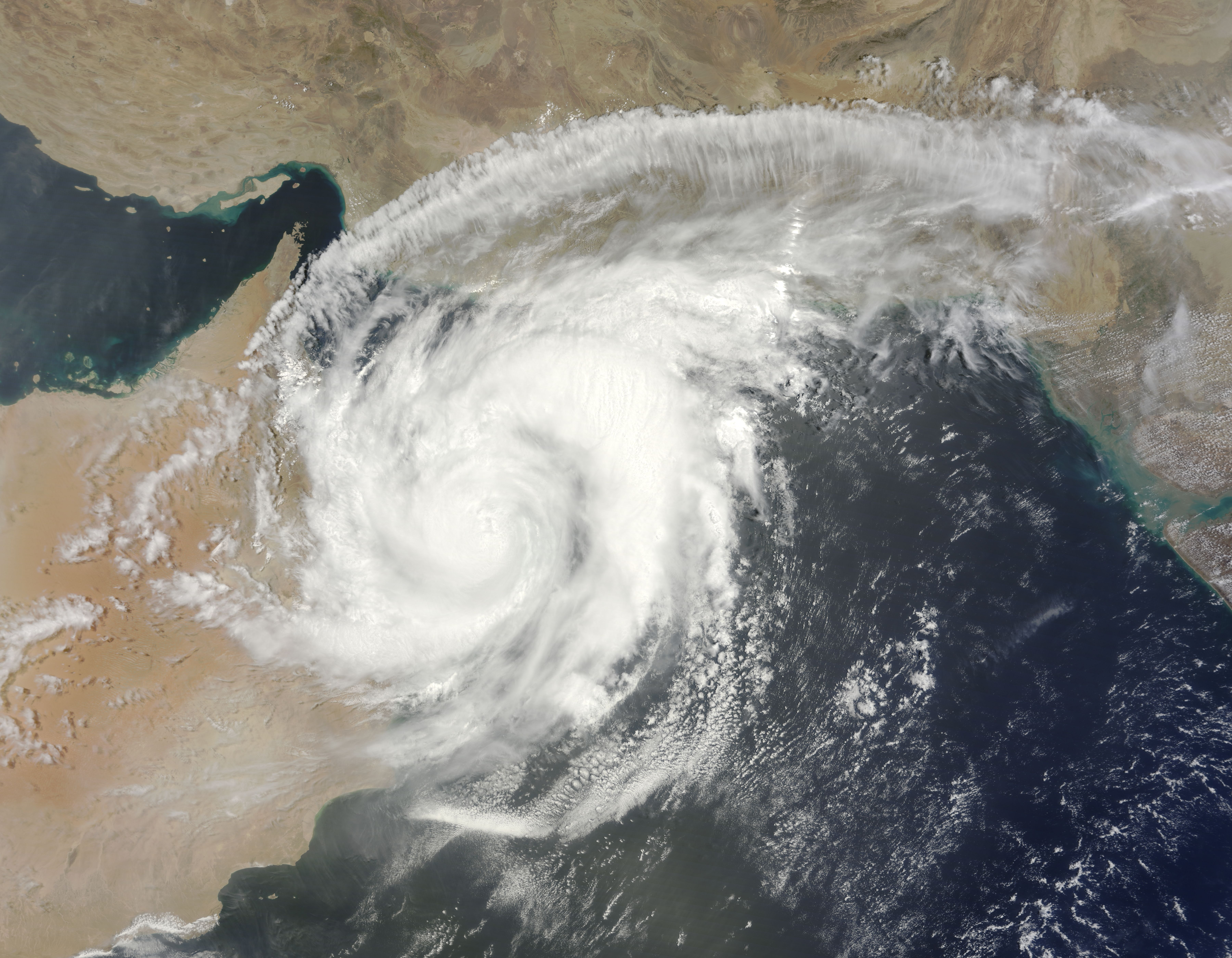
Cyclone Phet on its way to Gwadar in 2010

Cyclones that form in the Arabian Sea do not make a landfall in Gwadar since the city is located on the extreme western coast of Pakistan. The following are the cyclones that affected Gwadar city;

- In 1895, a cyclonic storm hit the Makran coast.
- In June 1948, a tropical storm made landfall along the Makran coast.
- In June 2007, a category-5 Cyclone Gonu (the strongest cyclone in the Arabian Sea) passed near the city as a cyclonic storm with lashing rains and high winds.
- On 26 June 2007, Cyclonic storm Cyclone Yemyin made landfall in the Balochistan coast as a high-end tropical storm.
- In June 2010, category-4 Cyclone Phet (the 2nd strongest cyclone in the Arabian Sea) passed near Gwadar as a strong category-1 Cyclone. Phet battered the city with record-breaking rains and strong windstorms.

== Annual rainfall of Gwadar ==
The following are the annual rainfall for the last few years based on data from the Pakistan Meteorological Department.

- In 2008, more than 44 millimetres (1.7 in) rainfall was recorded.
- In 2009, a total of 150 millimetres (5.9 in) rainfall was recorded.
- In 2010, a total of 432 millimetres (17.0 in) rainfall was recorded.
- In 2011, a total of 13 millimetres (0.51 in) rainfall was recorded as of 7 October 2011.

== See also ==
- Climate of Pakistan
- Climate of Quetta
- Pakistan Meteorological Department
- List of extreme weather records in Pakistan
- 2011 Balochistan floods
