= 2016 Pakistan Floods =

Natural disaster in Pakistan

In 2016 Pakistan experienced higher rainfall than normal (10-20%), especially in the pre-monsoon season. Heavy monsoon rains are common in the region. This led to multiple periods of flooding, landslides, and damage (including loss of life) particularly in Northern Pakistan. The Swat River overflowed and multiple landslides occurred around Pakistan including in Khyber Pakhtunkhwa, Gilgit-Baltistan, Azad Jammu, and Kashmir.

Pakistan geographical regions and main rivers

== Overview ==
Heavier than usual pre-monsoon rains affected over 53 districts of Pakistan resulting in deaths, injuries, and damage with 56% of deaths occurring in Khyber Pakhtunkhwa (where the most rain fell). Flooding and landslides damaged houses alongside the Karakoram Highway. Road blockages disrupted supply chains resulting in food shortages in Gilgit-Baltistan. The Pakistan Government did not request support from the international community but airlifted 20 tons of emergency food and shelter supplies to Gilgit-Baltistan to assist in the relief efforts. The Pakistan Red Crescent Society and Agha Khan Development Network (AKDN) provided emergency health kits and non-food items including tents. The Pakistan Government also ensured compensation for deaths and injuries amongst the families affected. Despite the ongoing rains the government returned families back to their places of origin.

Table 1: Reported numbers from National Disaster Management Authority, Government of Pakistan
Month	Type of disaster	Areas affected	Deaths	Injuries	Houses damaged
March - May 2016	Heavy pre-monsoon rains	Punjab, Khyber Pakhtunkhwa, Gilgit Baltistan, Azad Jammu & Kashmir	271	279	2929
June - September 2016	Monsoon rains	Khyber Pakhtunkhwa, Balochistan, Azad Jammu & Kashmir	153	113	1452

== Background ==
Heavy rainfall is common in Southern Asia during the pre-monsoon season.

=== Geography and climate ===
The Northern regions of Pakistan include parts of the Karakorum mountains and the Himalaya range, containing many of the world's highest mountain peaks as well as large glaciers. The presence of these geological features combined with the flow of warm, moist air from the Bay of Bengal, subject the region to periods of extreme rainfall and increased fluvial flows. This includes two regular monsoon seasons from June through September, and October to November. The rain during monsoon seasons combined with increasing amounts of glacial melt in lakes and rivers, contribute to frequent flooding events in Pakistan. The primary source of flood flows in 2016 were generated by moderate to heavy downpour in upper catchments of major rivers and their tributaries.

=== Climate change ===
The severity of previous floods in Pakistan, notably the 2010 flood, have been directly attributed to the effects of climate change. One of the major climate threats is the predicted increase of extreme weather, coupled with changing monsoon rains which cause intense floods followed by periods of drought. Climate change has increased the frequency of flooding events in the region and in Pakistan in particular. In recent memory the most severe of these were the devastating floods in 2010.

=== Housing, infrastructure and governance ===
After severe floods in 1973 and 1976, the Federal Flood Commission was established to assume a unified national responsibility for flood protection works (previously a devolved responsibility of the provincial governments within Pakistan). A government report in 2009 acknowledged the limited success of flood protection measures in the major river valleys of Pakistan, and also noted that "As there is no proper regulatory frame work in the country regarding the settlement in riverine areas, most of the poor people have constructed their shelters along the vulnerable river banks and become victims to devastating floods."

== Geographical and physical impact of the 2016 Pakistan floods ==
Due to varying geography, Pakistan has many different climates, including: hot desert climates, humid subtropical climates, hot semi-arid climates, cold desert climates, cold semi-arid climates and oceanic climates. The average annual precipitation is 494mm and the average monthly precipitation is 4.30mm. Pakistan is also described as having "three major hydrological landscapes" these consist of the Indus Basin, the Kharan Basin and the Makran Coastal area. It was large quantities of rainwater and glacial melt into the Indus Basin area that primarily contributed to the 2016 floods.

Pakistan's monsoon rains originate from moisture which moves over India. Consequently, flooding events occur every year. However, the monsoons are beginning to migrate north-westerly, where there are fewer smaller and narrower rivers which are not sufficient to collect monsoon water to prevent flooding.

In the provinces of Punjab, Balochistan, Khyber-Paktunkhwa, FATA, Azad Jammu and Kashmir, it was reported that 171 houses were damaged as of the 18th of March 2016.

Rain started at night of Saturday, April 3, rainfall began to spur floods in the Khyber Pakhtunkhwa region in the northwest.

As of the 13th of April 2016, it was reported that 2700 houses were damaged. and many collapsed. This was due to the heavy rain which caused flooding and consequently landslides. As a result, food shortages in Gilgit Balistan were experienced due to the blocking of the Karakoram Highway. Houses are often poorly built, especially in rural areas which meant they were susceptible to collapse after heavy rain. 300,000 families were registered displaced after the floods but now half have returned to their homes. The recurrence of frequent floods in Pakistan poses serious threat to crops, properties and human life.

Another flood began in August. At least 82 people were killed during the floods, including a disaster involving a bus which resulted in the deaths of 27 people and the disappearance of four.

== Response ==
Pakistan's National Disaster Management Authority (NDMA) played a critical role in the management of the nation's coordination of rescue, relief and recovery efforts with all stakeholders . As part of preparations for the 2016 monsoon season, a National Post Flood-2015 Review Conference was held in January 2016, seeking to implement a strong response for future monsoons.

Khyber Pakhtunkhwa government began to administer relief for those affected. Rural areas with poor infrastructure were highly susceptible, and, consequently, some 150 homes were destroyed in the event. The floods also caused deadly landslides that killed another 23 people. However, 5 survived and were rescued. Furthermore, the rain washed away bridges and roads in the area, as well as causing crop loss.

=== Pre-monsoon ===
The Pakistan Meteorological Department (PMD) forecasted an early Monsoon season, and so preparations for response were made early. Pre-monsoon instructions were issues to all stakeholders on March 18, 2016, one week after the pre-monsoon spell started. The Khyber Paktunkhwa region was most heavily impacted by the pre-monsoon season and its government administered relief to citizens in the region. The equivalent of $1,000 was issued to those whose houses were destroyed or $500 to those partially damaged. Injured citizens received $500, and relatives of the deceased received $3,000. In 2016, for the first time, pre-monsoon season was more intense and devastating than the actual monsoon season.

=== Monsoon ===
To enhance the response capabilities of the Army, the National Reserve of Flood Fighting Equipment was created, providing fiber glass boats and lifesaving jackets to various regions. Due to the enhanced preparations prior to monsoon season, awareness levels were high, resulting in timely evacuations during flash floods. Inter-provincial coordination proved problematic during the period, with important communication artery between Punjan and AJK being closed off due to the delayed clearance of a landslide on a road in the District Rawalpindi.

Relief provided throughout the entire monsoon season in 2016 was extensive: 6,493 tents; 4,198 plastic mats; 10,392 blankets; 323 tons of food items. The Pakistan Army engaged in relief and rescue operations in heavily impacted areas providing food, shelter and medical aid. Although the international community were in close contact, no request for assistance was made during the floods of 2016.

== Aftermath ==
=== Deaths and injuries ===
According to Pakistan's NMDA, there were a total of 424 deaths as a result of the pre-monsoon rains (March–May 2016) and monsoon season (June–September 2016). 153 of the people who died were children. By province, Khyber-Pakhtunkhwa was the worst affected during both disasters, with a total of 226 deaths. Unfortunately some bodies were not able to be recovered, and therefore all mortality statistics are estimates. 279 people nationwide were injured in the pre-monsoon rains, and 113 people were injured during the monsoon season. Deaths and injuries were largely due to the collapse of unstable buildings in landslides, and vehicles being swept away in fast moving flood water.

Pre-monsoon death and injury statistics by province (as per NMDA)
Province	Deaths	Injuries
Punjab	10	18
Balochistan	19	20
Khyber-Pakhtunkhwa	157	154
Azad Jammu & Kashmir	25	19
Gilgit Balkistan	22	24
Federally Administered Tribal Areas	38	44
Total	271	279

Monsoon death and injury statistics by province (as per NMDA)
Province	Deaths	Injuries
Punjab	29	-
Balochistan	18	23
Khyber-Pakhtunkhwa	69	87
Azad Jammu & Kashmir	6	2
Gilgit Balkistan	3	1
Federally Administered Tribal Areas	27	-
Islamabad	1	-
Total	153	113

=== Difficulty accessing healthcare ===
Despite rapid response to try and clear roads affected by landslides, it was difficult to provide outside assistance to remote villages. People in rural areas struggled to access healthcare, as local hospitals did not have the facilities to treat them and travel to hospitals further afield was difficult.

=== Internal displacement ===
Following the floods in 2015, over 300,000 people were registered as internally displaced. Despite predications of a particularly bad monsoon season in 2016, 16,000 families were returned to the Federally Administered Tribal areas in April 2016 (approximately half the number that had been displaced in the previous year). During the pre-monsoon rains, thousands of people were stranded in north west Pakistan due to road blockages caused by landslides. Rescue efforts centred around people stuck under debris of their houses and provision of aid supplies (including tents). Local administrations evacuated hundreds of people from each region of Pakistan in July and August before rain hit, preventing loss of life. However, damage to homes by the floods meant these people could not be returned quickly.

== Health impacts ==
=== Short term ===
People displaced by the floods were more vulnerable to viral epidemics (e.g. yellow fever) and waterborne and vector borne diseases: malaria, leptospirosis, typhoid and West Nile fever. Diarrhoeal, respiratory and skin infections increase in the weeks and months following floods. Even without flooding events, Neglected Tropical Diseases (NTDs) like dengue are widespread but floods increased infection rates due to increased standing water. Damage to sanitation infrastructure increased the risk of cholera, specifically Vibrio cholerae which is endemic in Pakistan following the 2010 floods. Health care was disrupted where access to health facilities is already limited. In parts of Khyber Pakhtunkhwa facilities are over 30 minutes' walk away.

=== Long term ===
Inadequate access to health care contributes to poorer health outcomes and increased DALYs in the long term. Non-communicable diseases (NCDs) like depression and post-traumatic stress disorder increase in the aftermath of floods. This is not readily acknowledged or addressed in disaster responses. Failure to adequately address the trauma of repeated exposure to flooding events and the ways in which floods exacerbate disease burden has a detrimental impact on people's psycho-social and physical well-being.

== Changes in response to flooding ==
=== Adaptive responses ===
Use of land and agriculture to reduce the impact of flash and heavy flooding events in the Khyber Pakhtunkhwa region.

The creation of irrigation structures, the variegation of crops including the use of crop varieties that are more resilient to the changing climate, and changing the crop calendar to improve the integrity of the land and to reduce crop loss are all techniques advocated. However, implementation is constrained by availability of finance, knowledge and training of farmers around sustainable land use for cultivation and access to new technologies.

=== Mitigation measures ===
Resilience of individual households

Households are more likely to adopt well known and straight forward mitigation measures rather than longer term or complex ones. Once again, floods impact the poorest and mitigation measures are constrained by available finance, minimal access to an early warning systems and insufficient land use planning. Investment in these areas is essential to reduce future vulnerabilities.
