= Bagai Mahal =

- Photograph of the Bagai Mahal in Dera Ismail Khan, Pakistan prior to its destruction
- Interactive map of the Bagai Mahal area

General information
- Status: Demolished
- Architectural style: Vernacular haveli (palatial residence)
- Location: Multani Mohallah, Walled City, Dera Ismail Khan, Khyber Pakhtunkhwa, Pakistan
- Coordinates: 31.8313°N 70.9017°E
- Construction started: Late 19th century
- Demolished: March 2021
- Owner: Suhail Rajput

Bagai Mahal was a late 19th-century architectural landmark in Dera Ismail Khan. It was a Rajput palace that belonged to Rai Sahib Das Ram Bagai. It was demolished in 2021 by a local politician and real-estate dealer.

== History ==
Bagai Mahal was the familial residence of the Bagai family, historic landowners and traders who settled in DI Khan over 150 years ago. Born here in 1879 was Rai Sahib Das Ram Bagai, a philanthropist who founded numerous schools and medical facilities, and secured funds for embankments on the River Indus, preventing catastrophic floods. The Bagai family left Pakistan due to Hindu-Muslim conflicts, leaving their property behind.

=== Destruction ===
The present owner of Bagai Mahal is Suhail Rajput, a local politician and real estate businessman. Heritage advocates stated the structure was around 125-years-old at the time it was demolished but Abdul Samad, the head of Directorate of Archaeology and Museums, claimed it was only 92-years-old and did not meet the 100-year threshold to afford it protection under local law. When the building was demolished, the current owner remarked: "It was owned by a Hindu…I want to show the Hindu sympathizers that this is now my property. Period."
