= 2012 Pakistan floods =

Natural disaster in Pakistan

- Location: Punjab, Sindh, Balochistan, Khyber Pakhtunkhwa
- Deaths: 455

The 2012 Pakistan floods began in early September 2012, resulting from heavy monsoon rains in Khyber Pakhtunkhwa, Upper Sindh, Southern Punjab and Balochistan regions of Pakistan.

== Flooding and impact ==
Initially according to the met Office forecasts, Pakistan was to receive below normal rainfall in 2012 and most of these areas were bracing for a drought. But by 1 September the Pakistan Meteorological Department started to roll out emergency weather advisories stating that an extremely low pressure Monsoon system, developed over the Bay of Bengal will enter the country and cause widespread heavy rainfall across Southern Punjab, Southern Khyber Pukhtunkhwa, eastern Balochistan and Sindh

The low pressure system entered the country on 3 September and lashed these areas with heavy falls. The system continued to stay till 12 September 2012. Flash floods triggered by heavy rains caused widespread destruction across vast swathes of the country, breaking a 24-year rainfall record and leaving over 100 people dead in upper Sindh, wreaking devastation in Punjab's Dera Ghazi Khan and Rajanpur areas and leaving five districts of eastern Balochistan cut off from the rest of the country.

On 9 September The Met Office said that between 8am and 5pm Dera Ghazi Khan and Okara received 96mm of rain, Shorkot 85mm, Bahawalnagar and Sahiwal 79mm, Noorpur Thal 66mm, Toba Tek Singh 65mm, Bahawalpur city 45mm, Jhang 35mm, Rahim Yar Khan 31mm, Multan 27mm, Faisalabad 25mm, Nawabshah 24mm, Chhor 23mm, Bhakkar 20mm, Chakwal and Dera Ismail Khan 17mm, Parachinar and Mandi Bahauddin 16mm, Thatta 15mm, Joharabad and Rawalakot 14mm and Kotli 12mm.

=== Heavy rainfalls recorded during the wet spell of September 2012 ===
Heavy rainfalls were recorded during the five-day wet spell from 5 September to 9 September 2012 in the provinces of Sindh and Punjab based on data from the Pakistan Meteorological Department.

City	Rainfall (mm)	Rainfall (in)	Province
Jacobabad	481*	18.94*	Sindh
Khanpur	291*	11.45*	Punjab
Larkana	239	9.4	Sindh
Rahim Yar Khan	236	9.29	Punjab
Sukkur	206	8.11	Sindh
Shorkot	152*	5.9*	Punjab
Chhor	137	5.3	Sindh

* Indicates new record in the month

== See also ==
- List of floods in Pakistan
- 2011 Pakistan floods (disambiguation)
