= 2011 Pakistan floods =

2011 Pakistan floods may refer to:

- 2011 Sindh floods
- 2011 Balochistan floods
- 2011 Kohistan floods
