= Climate of Islamabad =

Islamabad, Pakistan

Climate chart (precipitation, max. and min. temperature)
J	F	M	A	M	J	J	A	S	O	N	D
55 18 4	93 20 7	95 25 11	58 31 17	40 36 22	78 38 25	311 35 25	317 34 24	135 33 22	34 31 16	18 25 9	26 20 5
- █ Average max. and min. temperatures in °C
- █ Precipitation totals in mm
Imperial conversion
J	F	M	A	M	J	J	A	S	O	N	D
2.2 64 38	3.7 68 44	3.7 77 53	2.3 87 62	1.6 97 71	3.1 101 76	12 96 77	12 93 76	5.3 92 71	1.4 88 60	0.7 78 48	1 69 40
- █ Average max. and min. temperatures in °F
- █ Precipitation totals in inches

The climate of Islamabad is a humid subtropical climate (Köppen Cwa) with four seasons: a pleasant spring (March–April), a hot summer (May–August), a warm dry autumn (September—October), and a cold winter (November—February). The hottest month is June, where average highs routinely exceed 37 °C (98.6 °F). The wettest month is July, with heavy rainfall and evening thunderstorms, with the possibility of cloudburst. The coldest month is January, with temperatures varying by location. In Islamabad, temperatures vary from cold to mild, routinely dropping below 4 °C (39.2 °F) . In the hills there is sparse snowfall. The weather ranges from a minimum of −4.9 °C (23.2 °F) in January to a maximum of 46.1 °C (115.0 °F) in June. The average low is 6 °C (42.8 °F) in January, while the average high is 38.1 °C (100.6 °F) in June. The highest temperature recorded was 46.5 °C (115.7 °F) in June, while the lowest temperature was −4.9 °C (23.2 °F) in January. On 23 July 2001, Islamabad received a record breaking 620 millimetres or 24.4 inches of rainfall in just 10 hours – the heaviest rainfall in Pakistan during the past 100 years.

Climate data for Islamabad (1991–2020 normals)
Month	Jan	Feb	Mar	Apr	May	Jun	Jul	Aug	Sep	Oct	Nov	Dec	Year
Record high °C (°F)	30.1 (86.2)	30.0 (86.0)	37.0 (98.6)	44.0 (111.2)	45.6 (114.1)	46.6 (115.9)	45.0 (113.0)	42.0 (107.6)	38.1 (100.6)	38.0 (100.4)	32.2 (90.0)	28.3 (82.9)	46.6 (115.9)
Mean daily maximum °C (°F)	17.7 (63.9)	20.0 (68.0)	24.8 (76.6)	30.6 (87.1)	36.1 (97.0)	38.3 (100.9)	35.4 (95.7)	33.9 (93.0)	33.4 (92.1)	30.9 (87.6)	25.4 (77.7)	20.4 (68.7)	28.9 (84.0)
Daily mean °C (°F)	10.7 (51.3)	13.4 (56.1)	18.1 (64.6)	23.6 (74.5)	28.7 (83.7)	31.4 (88.5)	30.1 (86.2)	29.1 (84.4)	27.6 (81.7)	23.3 (73.9)	17.3 (63.1)	12.5 (54.5)	22.2 (72.0)
Mean daily minimum °C (°F)	3.6 (38.5)	6.8 (44.2)	11.4 (52.5)	16.6 (61.9)	21.5 (70.7)	24.5 (76.1)	24.9 (76.8)	24.2 (75.6)	21.7 (71.1)	15.6 (60.1)	9.1 (48.4)	4.7 (40.5)	15.4 (59.7)
Record low °C (°F)	−6 (21)	−5.0 (23.0)	−3.8 (25.2)	2.1 (35.8)	5.5 (41.9)	13.0 (55.4)	15.2 (59.4)	14.5 (58.1)	13.3 (55.9)	5.7 (42.3)	−0.6 (30.9)	−2.8 (27.0)	−6.0 (21.2)
Average precipitation mm (inches)	55.2 (2.17)	93.4 (3.68)	95.2 (3.75)	58.1 (2.29)	39.9 (1.57)	78.4 (3.09)	310.6 (12.23)	317.0 (12.48)	135.4 (5.33)	34.4 (1.35)	17.7 (0.70)	25.9 (1.02)	1,261.2 (49.65)
Average precipitation days (≥ 1.0 mm)	4.7	6.3	7.3	6.1	5.2	6.0	12.3	11.9	6.4	2.9	2.0	2.0	73.1
Average relative humidity (%)	67	63	62	52	42	44	68	76	67	62	63	66	61
Mean monthly sunshine hours	195.7	187.1	202.3	252.4	319.0	300.1	264.4	250.7	262.2	275.5	247.9	195.6	2,952.9
Mean daily sunshine hours	6.3	6.6	6.5	8.4	10.1	10.0	8.5	8.1	8.7	8.9	8.3	6.3	8.1
Source 1: NOAA (sun, 1961-1990), Deutscher Wetterdienst (humidity 1973-1990, daily sun 1961-1990)
Source 2: PMD (extremes)

== Factors ==
The monsoon and the Western Disturbance are the two main factors that change the weather over Islamabad; otherwise, Continental air prevails for rest of the season. Following are the main factors that influence the weather over Islamabad.

- Western Disturbances occur almost every month in the city, but peaking during the winter months and causes moderate to heavy rainfall, temperature also decreases due to it.
- Fog does occur during the winter season and remains for weeks; especially near Margalla Hills.
- Dust storms occur during summer months with peak in April and May. These dust storms are quite violent.
- Southwest Monsoon occurs in summer from the month of June till September. These monsoon rains are quite heavy by nature and can cause severe flooding if they interact with westerly waves.
- Continental air prevails during the period when there is no precipitation in the city.

== Monthly weather conditions ==
The following is the monthly summary of the climatic conditions in Islamabad.

=== January ===
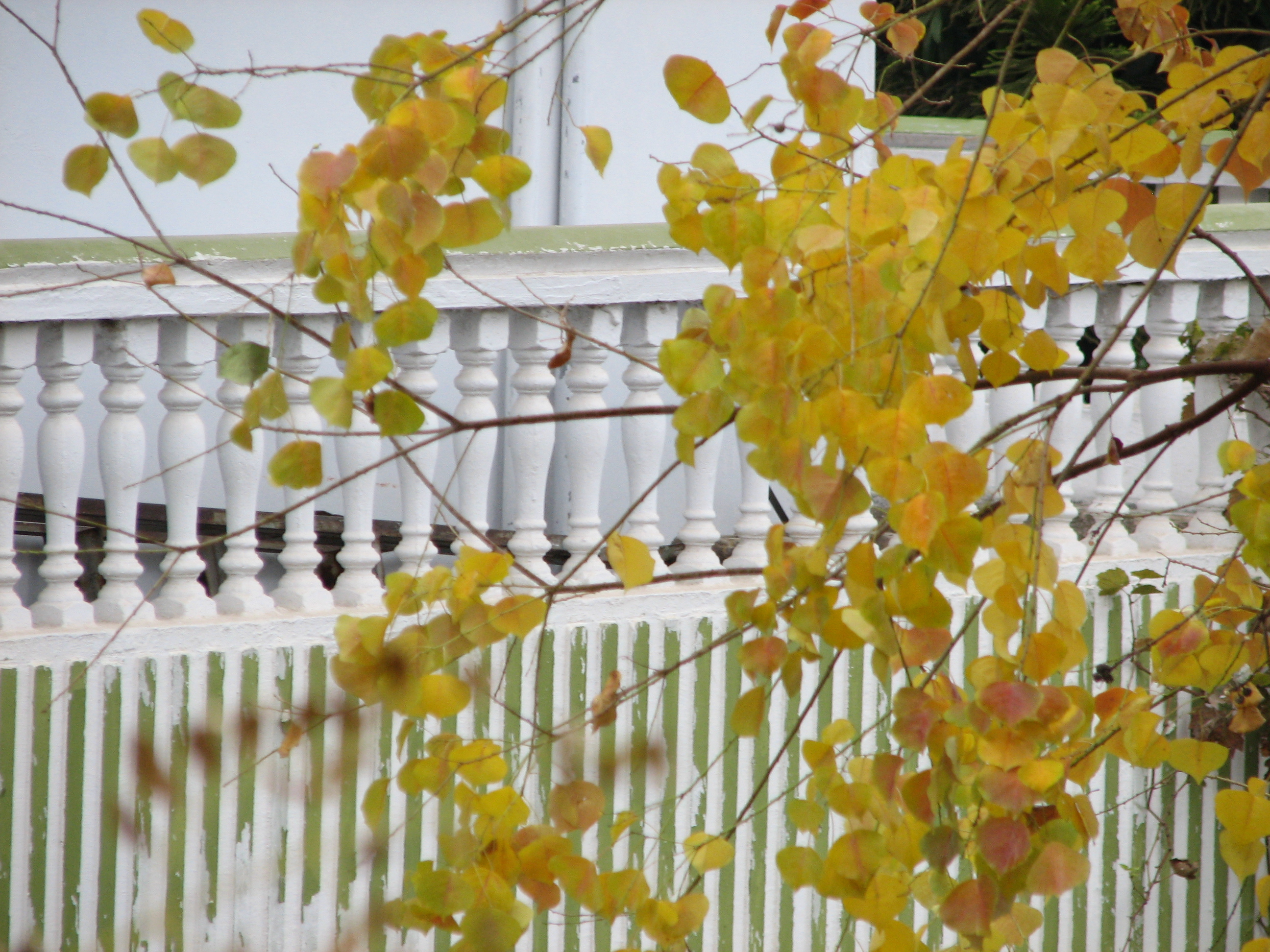
Winter season in Islamabad

January is the coldest month in Islamabad. January is typically the coldest month in Islamabad, with average minimum temperatures ranging from 38 to 43 °F (3.3 to 6.1 °C) Night-time temperatures occasionally fall below this range, although readings below 36°F (2.2°C) are relatively uncommon. Most days are clear blue skies; however, this month is prone to foggy nights and mornings. Near zero visibility is experienced during extremely foggy nights which hampers air traffic and motorways. The intensity of rainfall in this month is moderate to fairly-heavy similar to the western disturbance season in the city. Snowfall on higher elevations of Margalla Hills is common as it happens after every few years. It's not uncommon for Islamabad to receive light snow of 0.005 to 0.02 metres or 0.20 to 0.79 inches in strong cold spells.Snowfall has occurred only rarely in Islamabad, with notable instances in February 1984 and January 1964.The average rainfall for this month is 59 millimetres or 2.3 inches at Zero Point official observatory and 56 millimetres or 2.2 inches at Chaklala (old airport). Western Disturbance has a significant influence in this month of the city. It produces rains and sometimes hailstorms. The highest temperature is 30.1 °C (86.2 °F) (30 Jan 1995) and the lowest −4.9 °C (23.2 °F). While the highest rainfall for this month is 199 millimetres or 7.8 inches recorded at Zero Point in 1995.

=== February ===
The weather in Islamabad in February is warmer than that of January. The weather remains mild. Western Disturbance causes rainfall just like in January but the frequency and intensity of Western Disturbances are grater than in January. Average rainfall is relatively greater than January totaling to 84.1 millimetres or 3.31 inches at Chaklala airport and 89 millimetres or 3.5 inches at Zero Point official observatory. In 2013, record (Highest) rainfall of 306.1 millimetres or 12.05 inches at Chaklala airport was observed and a thunderstorms outbreak was experienced from three Western Disturbances that caused bizarre conditions of frequent hailstorms and 93 kilometres per hour or 58 miles per hour or 50 knots wind gusts. Moreover, hailstorms with thunderstorms are not a rare occurrence in this cool time of the year. Observations demonstrate that cold weather (below zero temperature) is not experienced after halfway through the month as plantation season officially begins during the last fortnight. On rare occasions, snowline has even dropped down just to 3,000 feet or 900 metres in February because of which Margalla Hills have received heavy snowfall in some years (especially up to a total of 1.5 feet or 0.46 metres of snow in 2005).

==== Snowfall on Margalla Hills 11 February 2016 ====
On 11 February 2016, the Margalla Hills received snowfall that was clearly visible from Islamabad. While the city temperature was around 5 °C or 41 °F, the higher elevation of Pir Sohawa caused temperatures to drop to near 1 °C or 33.8 °F, allowing snow to form. Approximately 0.05 metres or 2 inches of snow accumulated briefly before melting.

=== March ===
Spring starts, and in this month, the weather begins to settle. In March, the weather turns warmer making it very pleasant. Average relative humidity in this month is about 37%. Again, Western Disturbance has an effect on the weather, producing rain and hail. It causes rain with strong winds. Western Disturbance has no specific timing, it affects the upper and northern parts of Pakistan including Islamabad, in every month and season. March 2015 set a record rainfall of a massive 331.1 millimetres or 13.04 inches at Chaklala Airport. A few strong thunderstorms develop every year during this month, and sometimes these can be accompanied by dust storms and gusts near hurricane force at 126 kilometres per hour or 78 miles per hour or 68 knots. Hailstorms are both greater in frequency and intensity during March, and weather can quickly change during the day. The highest temperature is 36.0 °C or 96.8 °F, and the lowest is 0 °C or 32 °F. The highest rainfall for March is 333 millimetres or 13.1 inches (2015).

=== April ===
Another spring month with pleasant temperatures. April in Islamabad transitions from warm to hot during daytime, while night temperatures begin to move from cool to warm. Typically, late April sees a sharp rise in both the day and nighttime temperatures. The mean high during the afternoon is 30.2 °C (86.4 °F), while mornings enjoy a mean of 15.4 °C (59.7 °F). Record high for April is a sweltering 40.6 °C or 105.1 °F recorded on 29 April 2006 at Chaklala airport; on the other hand, a chilly low of 5.1 °C or 41.2 °F was witnessed on 7 April 1994. The weather at times gets hot in this month. Humidity remains low in this month, about 24%. While the highest rainfall is 264.5 millimetres or 10.41 inches (1983).

=== May ===
At the start of summer in May, the weather becomes sweltering in the city. The highest temperature is 45.6 °C (114.1 °F) (1988), While the lowest is 10.5 °C (50.9 °F) (1997). Humidity gets extremely low in May as compared to other months, at just 19%. Evening thunderstorms can occur in this month accompanied by dust storms that give the citizens of Islamabad much–awaited relief from the scorching heat. The highest rainfall is 115.6 millimetres or 4.55 inches (1965), The highest temperature ever recorded in Islamabad is 48.0 °C or 118.4 °F (2024)

=== June ===
June is the hottest month in Islamabad. Temperatures in this month can reach upto 46.6 °C or 115.9 °F as recorded in 2005, while the lowest temperature is 16 °C or 60.8 °F (2023). Until the first week of June, the weather is very dry. However, in the middle of June, pre-monsoon showers can start that come from the southwest monsoon. Dust storms are common in this month, which are locally called 'Andhi'. The highest rainfall for the month of June is 255 millimetres or 10.04 inches (2008). On 23 June 2010, a massive dust storm of 81 miles per hour or 130 kilometres per hour or 70 knots hit the city followed by drizzle before the storm, and temperatures peaked above 40 °C or 104 °F for four consecutive days. On 1 June 2016, the most powerful windstorm in the history of Islamabad struck the city with estimated wind gusts of more than 175 kilometres per hour or 109 miles per hour or 94 knots causing huge property damage, uprooting large number of trees and poles. Around thirty to forty people died in Rawalpindi and Islamabad due to that storm.

=== July ===
July is the start of the annual monsoon season and the wettest month for Islamabad as well as for the whole Pakistan, that continues till September. In July Islamabad can see some very heavy falls of rain accompanied by strong thunderstorms and windstorms. These heavy storms are due to the moisture coming from Arabian Sea and the Bay of Bengal and sometimes if western disturbances interact with them, then record rainfall can occur. Humidity remains above 65%. The highest temperature in this month can reach 45 °C or 113 °F and lowest temperature is 17.8 °C or 64.0 °F and the highest rainfall for this month is 1,089 millimetres or 42.87 inches, recorded at Zero Point H/8 official observatory in (2001). The heaviest rain in the city was also recorded in this month when 621 millimetres or 24.4 inches of rain occurred in just 10 hours on 23 July 2001 the continuous downpour lasted from 0600 to 1600 PST. In July 2008, a severe rainfall spell, that lasted from 4 to 9 July, produced a heavy rainfall of 162 millimetres or 6.38 inches in 5 hours. It was the heaviest short period rainfall in last six years reminding the cloud burst of 23 July 2001. While on 30 July 2010 a heavy downpour of 257 millimetres or 10.12 inches occurred that caused flash floods in the city.

=== August ===
Monsoon rains intensify in August. The month of August is the most humid month for Islamabad. The highest temperature is 42 °C or 107.6 °F (1987) and the lowest temperature is 18 °C or 64.4 °F (1976). While the highest rainfall for this month is 645.5 millimetres or 25.41 inches (1982). On 9 August 2011 a cloudburst in Islamabad that continued for three hours and yielded 176 millimetres or 6.93 inches of rain, flooded main streets. The year 2020 also saw record rains and caused havoc.

=== September ===
End of summer in which, day temperatures remain a bit high but evenings, nights and mornings are quite pleasant. Temperature starts to drop more in the night and by the end of September, summer seems to have gone away and autumn starts to approach. However, in recent years the month has become hotter, although everything depends on the rains: if there is much rain in September, weather will change quickly, but if not, then the weather changes gradually. Monsoon rains continue till the first two weeks of September, but they can be showers till the end of the month. After that monsoon completely withdraws from the city. Western disturbances in September can cause strong windstorms with moderate to heavy rainfall. The highest temperature is 38.1 °C or 100.6 °F (1982) and lowest is 13.3 °C or 55.9 °F. The highest rainfall in this month stands at 421 millimetres or 16.57 inches (2014).

=== October ===
The start of autumn, with pleasant temperatures. Day temperature can be a bit high, which can cause discomfort in the sun, while travelling and sitting without a fan. Evenings, nights and mornings are very pleasant, which urge one to go for walks and for outings. October is the driest month in the city, though in recent years it has been raining a lot. Western disturbance affect the city which causes light rain. Sometimes thunderstorms occur, which cause the temperature to drop more. In the middle of October the night temperature starts to drop very fast and winds start to become very cold which causes more drop in temperature. The highest rainfall for this month is 199.2 millimetres or 7.84 inches (2015). The highest temperature and lowest temperature is 37.8 °C or 100.0 °F (1998) and 5.7 °C or 42.3 °F (1984) respectively.

=== November ===
The Start of Winter month in the city And temperature starts to drop a lot. Mornings can become very chilly. Warm clothes are pulled out to wear. Some afternoons of November are a bit warm, in which people still avoid direct sunlight. While at times people like to work, play and even stand in the sun. Showers or hailstorms occur in this month too. The highest rainfall for this month is 91 millimetres or 3.58 inches (1959) and the highest and lowest temperature is 32.2 °C or 90.0 °F and 0 °C or 32 °F respectively.

=== December ===
In the month of December the winter finally sets in, while the coldest winter of the city is observed in January, weather becomes quite chilly in December too. Hot drinks, like tea and coffee with soups become common in the city. Fish is one of the most enjoyed dishes of winter. Rainfall in December is produced by western disturbances. The highest rainfall for this month is 177.9 millimetres or 7.00 inches (1990). The lowest temperature and highest temperature is −4.1 °C or 24.6 °F and 28.3 °C or 82.9 °F respectively.

== Monsoon rainfall of Islamabad ==
The average annual rainfall in Islamabad is 1,457 millimetres or 57.36 inches. Monsoon season starts at the end of June and last until the end of September. In 2009, Islamabad experienced below– normal monsoon rainfalls due to the presence of El Niño over Pakistan. It recorded only 354 millimetres or 13.94 inches of rain during the Monsoon season in 2009. The highest rainfall of 620 millimetres or 24.41 inches was recorded in Islamabad on 23 July 2001. The record– breaking rain fell in just 10 hours, making it the heaviest rainfall in Pakistan during the past 100 years . The following is the moonsoon rainfall in Islamabad since 2006 based on the data from Pakistan Meteorological Department.

- In 2006, a total of 962 millimetres or 37.9 inches rain was recorded.
- In 2007, a total of 1,117 millimetres or 44.0 inches rain was recorded.
- In 2008, a total of 1,108 millimetres or 43.6 inches rain was recorded.
- In 2009, a total of 354 millimetres or 13.9 inches was recorded.
- In 2010, a total of 1,171 millimetres or 46.1 inches was recorded.
- In 2011, a total of 1,716.2 millimetres or 67.6 inches was recorded.
- In 2012, a total of 988.9 millimetres or 38.9 inches was recorded.
- In 2013, a total of 1,988 millimetres or 78.3 inches was recorded.

== Cloud burst of 23 July 2001 ==
On 23 July 2001, Islamabad received a record– breaking 620 millimetres or 24.4 inches of rainfall in just 10 hours. It was the heaviest rainfall in Pakistan during the past 100 years. Continuous downpour in lasted for about 10 hours from 0600 to 1600 PST in Islamabad, caused the worst ever Flash Flood in the local stream called "Nulla Lai" and its tributaries, which swept away low-lying areas of the twin cities. The neighbour city, Rawalpindi also experienced 335 millimetres or 13.2 inches of rain on the same day. According to the official figures, at least 10 people died, 800 houses were destroyed and 1069 houses were partially damaged in Islamabad.

== Cloud burst of 28 July 2021 ==
On 28 July 2021, heavy rains started after a cloudburst in Islamabad, Pakistan, causing a flood situation in many parts of the federal capital and resulting in the death of two people. Several vehicles were swept away in the floods and water entered the basements of houses and plazas in Sector E-11, F-10 and D-12. A 116 mm of rain was recorded at the personal weather station in E-11/4 Islamabad.

== Pakistan Meteorological Departments in Islamabad ==
- National Seismic Monitoring and Tsunami Early Warning Center, Islamabad (Backup Station)
- Research & Development Islamabad
- Meteorological Forecasting Offices (mainly for Aviation purposes) Karachi, Lahore, Islamabad/Rawalpindi
- Remote sensing, Islamabad
- Drought, Environmental monitoring & early warning Center Islamabad
- Weather stations are located at Headquarters of PMD (Zero point), Saidpur Village, Golra Sharif, Bokra. However, the headquarters also control operations of the weather stations located in Rawalpindi; namely, Islamabad Airport (Chaklala), Shamasabad, and Qasim Airbase (Dhamial Camp)

== Additional Season (Monsoon) ==
Environmentalists and climatologists are now classifying Islamabad's climate into five distinct seasons. The newly added season is the Monsoon, characterized by heavy rainfall and high humidity. During this time, temperatures are relatively lower compared to the peak summer months of May and June. This distinct change in climate is the reason experts have classified the Monsoon as a separate season, given its unique nature compared to the typical summer months.

Season	Duration	Remarks
Summer	First week of May to end to June	Intense dry heat relatively low rainfall and temperature crossing 40 °C.
Monsoon	First week July to mid of September	Heavy to extreme rainfall with moderate temperature of around 32-33 °C but moderate to high heat index due to high humidity.
Autumn	Mid of September to end of October	Day temperature remains normal (not hot not cold) but night gets chilly and pleasant.
Winters	first week to November to end of February	Very chilly and cold especially during night and morning time in which the temperate gets below freezing point i.e. 4 °C. Snowfall usually occurs in Margalla hills but no snowfall in plain areas now due to climate change. There have been snow instances in city, February 1984 and January 1964. There have also a rare instance of snow in 1929.
Spring	First week to March to end of April	Pleasant warm and windy conditions. If rainfall than the weather gets cold otherwise very ideal.

== See also ==
- 2001 Islamabad cloud burst
- Climate of Pakistan
- Climate of Rawalpindi
- Developments in Islamabad
- List of extreme weather records in Pakistan
