= List of floods in Pakistan =

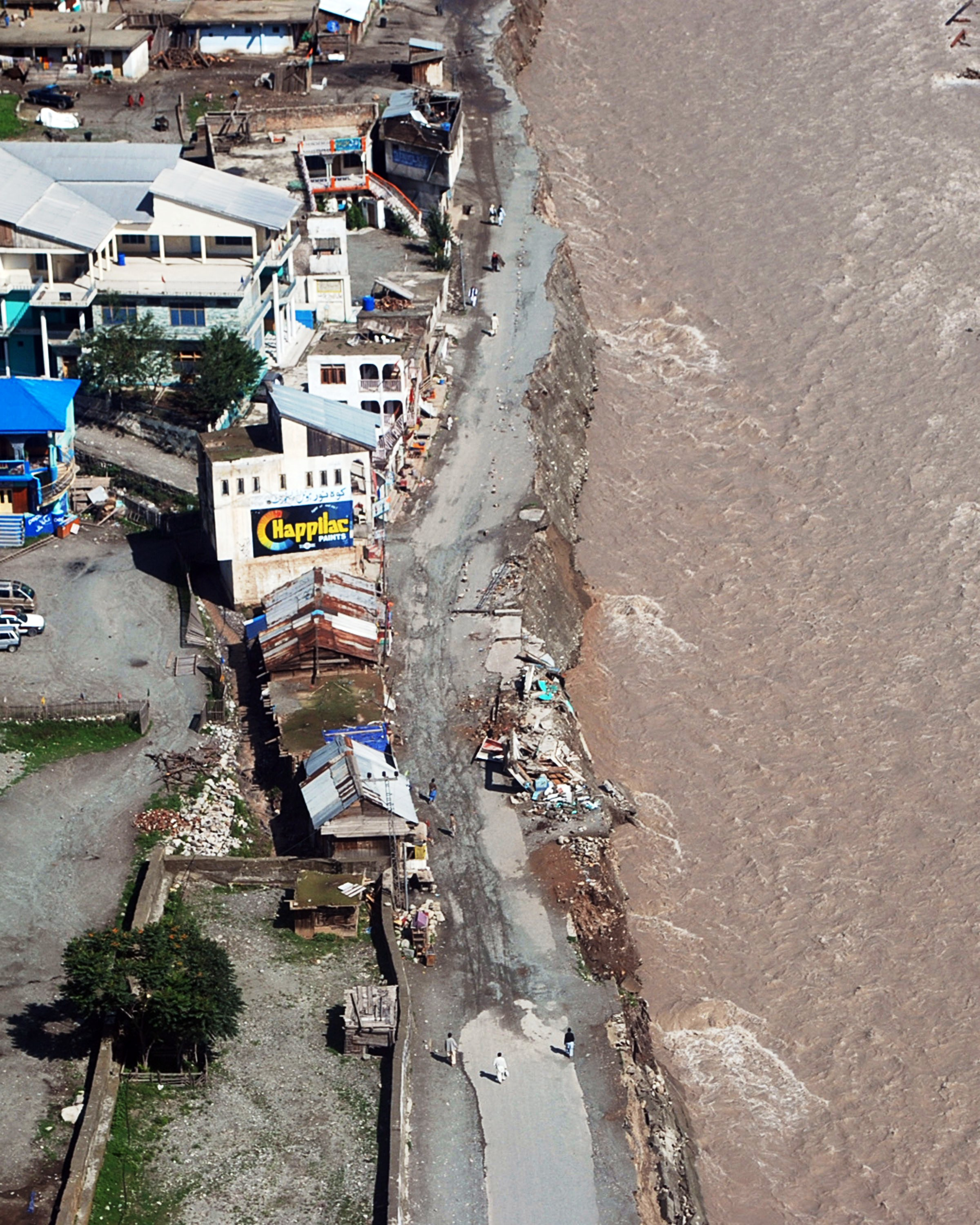
Damage caused by the floods of 2010

The following is a list of floods in Pakistan.

- In 1973, heavy rains in Indian Kashmir caused the Indus River to overflow and flood the Punjab province of Pakistan.
- 1992 India–Pakistan floods
- 1993 Monsoon Floods Across South Asia killed fifteen people in Pakistan.
- In 1995, heavy monsoon rains occurred in mid-July. Due to this Indus River and other rivers and canals started to flood. The rains stopped in time. Otherwise they would have caused more damage.
- In March 1998, flash floods in southwestern Pakistan, especially Baluchistan, caused over 300 fatalities, with 1,500 missing. Poor weather and damaged infrastructure hampered rescue efforts, and over 3,700 homes were destroyed. At least 25,000 people went homeless.
- 2001 Islamabad cloud burst
- In 2003, Sindh province was badly affected when above normal monsoon rainfall caused flooding in the province; urban flooding also hit Karachi where two days of rainfall of 284.5 millimetres (11.20 in) created havoc in the city, while Thatta District was the worst hit where 404 millimetres (15.9 in) rainfall caused flash floods in the district. At least 484 people were killed and some 4,476 villages in the province were affected.
- In 2007, Khyber Pakhtunkhwa, Sindh and coastal Balochistan were badly affected due to monsoon rainfall. Sindh and coastal Balochistan were affected by Cyclone Yemyin in June and then torrential rains in July and August, while Khyber Pakhtunkhwa was affected by melting glaciers and heavy rainfall in July and August. At least 130 people died and 2,000 were displaced in Khyber Pakhtunkhwa in July and 22 people died in August, while 815 people died in Balochistan and Sindh due to flash floods.
- 2009 Karachi floods
- In 2010, almost all of Pakistan was affected when massive flooding, caused by record breaking rains, hit Khyber Pakhtunkhwa and Punjab. The number of people affected by the flooding exceeds the combined total affected by the 2004 Indian Ocean earthquake and tsunami, the 2005 Kashmir earthquake and the 2010 Haiti earthquake. At least 2,000 people died in the flood and almost 20 million people were affected by it.
- 2011 Balochistan floods
- 2011 Kohistan floods
- In September 2011, at least 361 people were killed, some 5.3 million people and 1.2 million homes affected as well 1.7 million acres of arable land inundated when massive floods swept across the province of Sindh as a result of monsoon rains.
- In September 2012, more than 100 people were killed, and thousands of homes destroyed, with thousands of acres of arable land affected when flooding affected Khyber Pakhtunkhwa, southern Punjab and northern Sindh, resulting from monsoon rains.
- In September 2013, more than 80 people died due to the flooding.
- In September 2014, due to massive rain, flooding affected Jammu and Kashmir as well as in Punjab. Constituted flood situation in River Chanab and River Jhelum.
- 2016 Pakistan Floods
- 2017 Karachi floods
- 2019 Pakistan floods and storms
- In August 2020, Karachi received the heaviest rain in a single day ever in its history when 231 mm rain lashed out in just 12 hours. During August 2020, only Karachi received 484 mm (19 inches) rain. It is the highest rainfall record over the last 90 years. Rainwater and overflowed water from nullahs and drains flooded most of the main roads and streets in residential locations, a significant number of residential areas including urban slums and villages in peri-urban areas, that gravely disrupted the people’s lives.
- 2021 Islamabad flooding
- From June to August 2022, flooding affected most of Pakistan. Pakistan experienced severe flooding that affected various parts of the country, including Sindh, Balochistan, Punjab, and other areas. The provinces of Balochistan and Sindh were worst hit, while floods had also affected other parts of the country as far north as Kashmir. At least 1,500 people died in the flooding with 16 million children affected.
- 2022 Pakistan floods
  - In addition to the loss of life and human suffering, the floods caused extensive damage to crops, particularly in the province of Sindh. It was reported that the flood damage to crops in Sindh alone amounted to approximately Rs297 billion. This further compounded the economic impact of the floods and added to the challenges faced by the affected communities in rebuilding their lives and livelihoods.
- 2023 Pakistan floods
- 2024 Pakistan floods
  - 2024 Afghanistan–Pakistan floods - Intense bout of flash floods from 13–16 April.
  - In July 2025, severe floods struck Swat Valley and Gilgit-Baltistan, triggered by relentless monsoon rains and glacial lake outburst floods (GLOFs). At least 72 people died, and key infrastructure including roads, bridges, and homes was swept away, leaving remote communities stranded. The disaster exposed Pakistan’s weak climate preparedness, with no early warning systems or modern rescue tools in place. Public anger grew as locals in Swat and Astore condemned the government’s failure to act, despite repeated disasters in recent years. Damage to rebuilt infrastructure in Swat, including bridges and hotels, further highlighted systemic mismanagement. In Sindh, downstream communities fear flooding due to upstream dam discharges, threatening livelihoods and crops across the Indus basin.
- 2025 Pakistan floods: In June 2025, flash floods triggered by intense pre-monsoon rains caused widespread devastation across northern Pakistan. The floods swept away dozens of tourists picnicking along the Swat River in Khyber Pakhtunkhwa, leading to at least 18 deaths, with 10 people reported missing and 58 rescued. The disaster led to a national emergency response, and by July 2025, the total flood-related death toll across the country had risen to 111, including 53 children, according to the National Disaster Management Authority (NDMA). Punjab province reported the highest number of fatalities, underscoring the widespread impact of the floods across multiple regions.

== See also ==
- Climate of Pakistan
- List of deadliest floods
- List of tropical cyclones in Pakistan
- List of extreme weather records in Pakistan
