= Federal Flood Commission =

Pakistani government agency

Federal Flood Commission (Pakistan)
- ماموریہِ وفاقی سیلاب
- State emblem of Pakistan

Agency overview
- Formed: 1977; 49 years ago
- Jurisdiction: Pakistan
- Parent agency: Ministry of Water Resources
- Website: Federal Flood Commission

The Federal Flood Commission (FFC) (Urdu: ماموریہِ وفاقی سیلاب) is an agency under the administrative control of Ministry of Water Resources of the Government of Pakistan, which is responsible for the development and maintenance of flood protection and control systems in Pakistan.

Before the Federal Flood Commission was established in 1977, the provincial governments of Pakistan were responsible for flood prevention. After the heavy floods of 1973 and 1976, the Federal Flood Commission (FFC) was established to coordinate anti-flood measures on a nationwide scale.

== See also ==
- National Disaster Management Authority
- 2010 Pakistan floods
- Floods in Pakistan
