= Pakistan Secretary of Water Resources =

Administrative post of the ministry of Water Resources

Water Resources Secretary of Pakistan
- Incumbent; Muhammad Ashraf
- Seat: Islamabad
- Appointer: Prime Minister of Pakistan
- Website: Water Resources Division

The Water Resources Secretary of Pakistan is the Federal Secretary for the Ministry of Water Resources. The position holder is a BPS-22 grade officer, usually belonging to the Pakistan Administrative Service. The Secretary is responsible for management of country's water resources, policy formulation & implementation . Notable organisations that come under the control of the Water Resources Secretary are Federal Flood Commission, Indus River System Authority (IRSA), Office of Pakistan Commissioner for Indus Waters and Water and Power Development Authority (WAPDA). The current Secretary of Water Resources Division is Muhammad Ashraf.
