= Ministry of Water Resources (Pakistan) =

Ministry of the Government of Pakistan

- وزارت آبی وسائل

Ministry overview
- Formed: 4 August 2017; 6 year ago
- Preceding Ministry: Ministry of Water & Power
- Jurisdiction: Government of Pakistan
- Headquarters: 6 Atatürk Ave, G-5/1, Islamabad, Islamabad Capital Territory
- Annual budget: 79 Billion Rupees (2018-2019)
- Minister responsible: Musadik Malik
- Ministry executive: Muhammad Ashraf, Pakistan Secretary of Water Resources
- Website: mowr.gov.pk

The Ministry of Water Resources (Pakistan) Urdu: وزارت آبی وسائل, wazarat-e- aabi wasail (abbreviated as MoWR) is a Pakistan Government's federal and executive level ministry created on 4 August 2017 by then-Prime Minister Shahid Khaqan Abbasi. The ministry is headed by Pakistan Secretary of Water Resources. The ministry was created out of the Ministry of Water and Power, by depreciating the power division from the ministry, which was merged into the Ministry of Petroleum and Natural Resources and converted into the Ministry of Energy.

The Ministry has been tasked with the mission of development of country's water resources to meet future challenges of water shortage, provide visionary lead-ship role in National Water Policy formulation & implementation taking all stakeholders on board, by consistently embracing creativity, initiative, innovation and technology. The current budget for the years FY 2018–2019, is 79 billion rupees.

== Functions ==
As per Cabinet Division's Notification vide SRO-921 (i)/2017 dated September 13, 2017 regarding amendment in Schedule 1 of Rules of Business (Item 40) the functions assigned to the MoWR are as follows:

- Matters relating to development of Water resources of the Country
- Indus Water Treaty, 1969 and Indus Basin Works
- Liaison with International Engineering Organizations in Water Sector, such as International commission on large dams, international commission on Irrigation and Drainage and International Commission on large power system
- Federal agencies and Institutions for promotion of special studies in water sector
- Processing of development programs/ projects for approval of the competent authority.
- Review and processing of annual development budget of water sector projects and review budget of water related organizations.
- Provision of inputs for the preparation of Annual plans, Medium Term Plans and Perspective plans.
- Coordination with Water Wing of WAPDA, Office of the Chief Engineering Advisor/Chairman Federal Flood Commission, Indus River System Authority, Pakistan Commissioner for Indus Waters, International Waterlogging and Salinity Research Institute, Federal Ministries, Provincial Irrigation and Agriculture Departments, concerned departments of Government of AJ&K, NAs and Federally Administered Tribal Areas.
- Processing of consultancy agreements of water resources/flood control projects for approval from the concerned Ministries.
- Monitoring of water resources development and flood control projects.

== Departments ==
The following departments and authorities function under the Ministry as defined under the Schedule-III of the Rules of Business 1973:

- Federal Flood Commission
- Indus River System Authority
- Office of Pakistan Commissioner for Indus Waters
- Water and Power Development Authority (WAPDA)
