= 2024 Pakistan floods =

Natural disaster in Pakistan

2024 Pakistan Floods
- Date: 29 February 2024 – present
- Location: Pakistan
- Cause: Heavy rainfall
- Deaths: 100

Since 29 February 2024, flooding affected various regions across the country, including Sindh, Balochistan, Khyber Pakhtunkhwa, and Gilgit-Baltistan. At least 40 people were killed and 62 injured in the floods. Floods caused by heavy rains caused widespread destruction, disrupting normal life and damaging infrastructure. The government declared a state of emergency in several areas, and relief operations were launched by various agencies, including the Pakistan Navy, Pakistan Army, and the Frontier Corps.

== Sindh ==
Affected areas of flooding, EU Emergency Response Coordination Centre (ERCC)

=== Emergency declaration ===
In response to the forecast of heavy rains, the Sindh government imposed a rain emergency. Sindh Chief Minister Murad Ali Shah presided over a meeting to deal with the weather emergency and directed all local bodies, administrations and hospitals to be on high alert. Apart from this, half day was announced in all public and private institutions of Karachi.

=== Impact on education ===
The Sindh government has announced the cancellation of evening classes in schools in view of the fear of heavy rain. All private and government evening shift schools were directed to remain closed.

The P&D Department was directed to prepare a reconstruction plan for the remaining 5,483 totally damaged schools. The Sindh government had started the construction of 431 schools.

=== Relief efforts ===
Chief Minister Sindh reviewed the progress in reconstruction and rehabilitation of flood affected infrastructure. He directed his team to expedite ongoing works and pursue donors for funding where it is still pending.

== Balochistan ==
Heavy rains wreaked havoc in Gwadar, Makran and other areas of Balochistan. As a result of the continuous rains, a flood situation has arisen, due to which many areas have been submerged. The Provincial Disaster Management Authority (PDMA) has warned of more rain and wind/thunderstorm.

Flight operations at Gwadar Airport have been suspended due to the flood situation.

=== Relief operation in Gwadar and Kech ===
Pakistan Navy has started relief operations to help the population affected by the devastating rains and floods in Gwadar. Navy personnel, along with the local administration, were active in clearing floodwaters from houses and streets in various parts of the city. Pak Navy teams distributed food, drinking water and ration to flood affected people in different areas of Gwadar.

Chief Secretary Balochistan Shakeel Qadir Khan made a comprehensive review of the situation arising as a result of heavy rains in Gwadar and Kech districts. He called for coordinated efforts to save the affected people.

Pakistan Army, FC Balochistan, and civil administration are engaged in relief activities in Jiwani, Gwadar and Sirbandar to help the flood affected people. Medical teams set up free medical camps in different areas of Gwadar, Sir Bandar and Jiwani.

Caretaker Chief Minister Balochistan Mir Ali Mardan Khan Domki directed the PDMA and the district administration to use all available resources to provide facilities to the victims in the flood affected areas of Gwadar.

== Khyber Pakhtunkhwa ==
=== Casualties and damage ===
An incident occurred as a result of the heavy rain and subsequent destruction, six members of the same family including two women and four children were killed when the roof of a house collapsed in Zakha Khel Bazar of Khyber district. Additionally, 16 children are among the 29 people killed in rain- and snow-related incidents.

=== Relief measures ===
In response to this disaster, Khyber Pakhtunkhwa Chief Minister Ali Amin Khan Gandapur announced a compensation package for rain-affected families in the province. The relief check includes Rs 10 lakh for those killed, Rs 300,000 for seriously injured and Rs 50,000 for minor injuries. Financial compensation was also provided for property damage caused by rains.

== Gilgit-Baltistan ==
Major roads were blocked in Gilgit-Baltistan, many areas lost access.

== International aid ==
China Overseas Ports Holding Company Limited (COPHC), the operator of Gwadar Port, launched a rescue operation and donated relief materials to the flood victims in Gwadar. The company immediately bought 30,000 bottles of mineral water, 3,000 bottles of canned food etc. and distributed them among the victims.

== Reactions ==
Prime Minister Shahbaz Sharif announced a comprehensive relief package for the flood-affected people of Gwadar. The relief package includes financial compensation for the affected families, including Rs 20 lakh for the kin of the deceased, Rs 50 lakh for the injured and Rs 75 lakh for the families whose houses were destroyed in the torrential rains. are The Prime Minister assured that the package will be released in four days.

Apart from the relief package, Chief Minister Khyber Pakhtunkhwa Ali Amin Gandapur expressed grief over the loss of precious human lives due to rains.

During the crisis, Naval Chief Admiral Naveed Ashraf expressed confidence in the operational readiness of the Pakistan Navy to defend the maritime borders of the country.

Balochistan Chief Minister Sarfraz Bugti formed a committee to assess the damage caused by heavy rains and floods in Gwadar district. The committee was given the task of submitting its report to the Chief Minister in 20 days.

== See also ==
- List of floods in Pakistan
- 2024 Central Asian floods
