= Climate of Rawalpindi =

Coordinates: 33.6°N 73.05°E

Rawalpindi features a humid subtropical climate (Köppen: Cwa) with hot summers and cool to cold winters. Its climate is classified as very similar to that of its twin city, Islamabad, but the geographical location and extreme urbanization of Rawalpindi have led to weather and climatic conditions that are notably different from its twin. Rawalpindi's weather has historically been known to change rather quickly due to its proximity to the Himalayas and the Pir Panjal Range. These mountains not only influence the weather of the city, but also provide great recreation during the hot months. Furthermore, Its warm comfortable mean annual temperature of 21.3 °C (70 °F) attracts people to live here permanently from all over Pakistan. The average annual rainfall is abundant at 1,346.8 millimetres (53.02 in), most of which falls in the monsoon season. However, frontal cloud bands also bring significant rainfall in the winter. In summers, June is the hottest with record maximum temperature at a blistering 48.3 °C (119 °F) recorded on 13 June 1953. On the other hand, January is the coldest month of the year when temperature can drop to a minimum −3.9 °C (25 °F) in the winter recorded on 17 January 1967. The coldest temperature ever recorded in Rawalpindi was −4.4 °C (24.1 °F) on 10 February 1950, during a rare snowfall event in the city. Throughout the year, Rawalpindi and Islamabad experience an average of about 98 thunderstorms, which is the highest frequency of thunderstorms in Punjab province of any plane station. In fact, most rainfall in the city is accompanied by a thunderstorm with peak activity experienced in August. Record rainfall was experienced in the year 2013 at a massive 1,988 millimetres (78.3 in) mostly due to an unusually wet monsoon season. On a typical day, the city hosts breezy afternoons(30 kilometres per hour (19 mph)+), but usually calm to light breeze (Beaufort scale) wind conditions are observed after midnight. The mean annual wind speed of Rawalpindi is roughly 10 kilometres per hour (6.2 mph) at 14 m height. Moreover, just a few kilometers southwest of Rawalpindi, the potential power generation has been identified by U.S. Aid to be between marginal to good (5.4 metres per second (19 km/h) to 7.4 metres per second (27 km/h)) at 50 m height.

== Prevailing conditions ==
Western Disturbance, Monsoon and localized convection currents during the summers are responsible for changing weather conditions in Rawalpindi. Following is a list and conditions provided for the change in weather conditions.

- Western Disturbances occur almost every month in the city, but peaks during the winter months. Not only do these disturbances decrease day and night temperatures, but provides the city with rainfall during its dry months. However, by the time these winds reach Rawalpindi, these westerly waves are quite weak in intensity resulting in only light to moderate amounts of rainfall. Heavy rainfall from these disturbances are rare. Nonetheless, February 2013 experienced record rains accumulating to 310 millimetres (12 in)
- Monsoon result in the greatest amount of rainfall in the city and reduces the excruciating heat of the relatively dry early summer months. During late June, July, August, and early September with every out easterly winds with the intensity of fresh breeze bring along the monsoon clouds and push them against the mighty Himalayas. Most often, significant rainfall in Rawalpindi doesn't occur until these moisture laden air interact with western disturbances, producing powerful supercell thunderstorms accompanied with heavy winds, lightning and heavy to very heavy rainfall. Furthermore, these storms can last from 20 minutes to several hours in duration. The highest dew point is experienced during this time of the year with extremely high heat indices.
- Dust storms occur most frequently during the dry heat of May and June, but may well also be occur during the months of late March and April. Dust storms in Rawalpindi are most often accompanied by thunderstorms producing squalls and lightning. Visibilities drop below 100 meters in extreme cases with wind speeds surpass a fierce 157 kilometres per hour (98 mph). Rainfall from these storms is generally low to moderate.
- Continental Air prevails during the dry periods of the year with ample sunshine and partly cloudy to clear skies. As high pressure is established atmosphere becomes stable result in no precipitation until a western disturbance intervenes. Strong breeze from westerly direction blow during the day, while nights are calm during this time.

== Thunderstorms ==
Rawalpindi experiences one of the greatest number of thunderstorms in Pakistan. At a frequency of 89.45 thunderstorms per year on average, which is quite high, these numbers are comparable to those of Florida, USA. Some of the strongest thunderstorms in the country occur here either accompanied by dusty squalls, microbursts, cloudburst and sometimes even funnel clouds. Its location allows it to experience the maximum wind speed of the storm relative to its twin city Islamabad. On 13 October 2006, wind gusts from a powerful thunderstorm reported by Pakistan Meteorological Department to have reached 167 kilometres per hour (104 mph). The strongest wind gust during this storm was reported to be 95 knots or 176 kilometres per hour (109 mph), which is the highest recorded wind speed in Rawalpindi/Islamabad region and adjoining areas. As a matter of fact, a funnel cloud was also observed during this storm near Chaklala, Rawalpindi. Tornadoes are rare, but have been reported thrice in the past decade in 2006 and 2012, 2014. The biggest challenge that arises due to these dangerous conditions include fallen trees, downed power lines, and damage to infrastructure including mud houses in the slums and billboards around the city.

== Monthly conditions ==
Climate data for Rawalpindi
Month	Jan	Feb	Mar	Apr	May	Jun	Jul	Aug	Sep	Oct	Nov	Dec	Year
Record high °C (°F)	30.1 (86.2)	30.0 (86.0)	36.0 (96.8)	40.6 (105.1)	45.6 (114.1)	48.3 (118.9)	45.4 (113.7)	42.0 (107.6)	38.1 (100.6)	37.8 (100.0)	32.2 (90.0)	28.3 (82.9)	48.3 (118.9)
Mean daily maximum °C (°F)	16.7 (62.1)	18.3 (64.9)	23.9 (75.0)	30.0 (86.0)	36.7 (98.1)	40.0 (104.0)	36.6 (97.9)	34.4 (93.9)	33.9 (93.0)	31.7 (89.1)	25.6 (78.1)	19.4 (66.9)	28.9 (84.1)
Daily mean °C (°F)	10.0 (50.0)	11.9 (53.4)	16.9 (62.4)	22.5 (72.5)	28.6 (83.5)	32.2 (90.0)	30.8 (87.4)	29.4 (84.9)	27.2 (81.0)	22.7 (72.9)	16.1 (61.0)	11.4 (52.5)	21.6 (71.0)
Mean daily minimum °C (°F)	3.3 (37.9)	5.6 (42.1)	10.4 (50.7)	15.3 (59.5)	20.6 (69.1)	24.5 (76.1)	25.0 (77.0)	24.4 (75.9)	21.6 (70.9)	14.5 (58.1)	6.7 (44.1)	3.3 (37.9)	14.6 (58.3)
Record low °C (°F)	−3.9 (25.0)	−2.7 (27.1)	1.1 (34.0)	5.0 (41.0)	6.1 (43.0)	15.5 (59.9)	17.2 (63.0)	17.2 (63.0)	11.6 (52.9)	5.5 (41.9)	−0.5 (31.1)	−2.8 (27.0)	−3.9 (25.0)
Average precipitation mm (inches)	67.1 (2.64)	84.1 (3.31)	128.4 (5.06)	63.2 (2.49)	39.1 (1.54)	144.3 (5.68)	351.3 (13.83)	340.3 (13.40)	142.7 (5.62)	31.7 (1.25)	14.4 (0.57)	36.2 (1.43)	1,442.8 (56.82)
Average precipitation days	5	6	6	5	4	6	14	15	7	2	2	3	75
Source 1: Climate-Data.org, altitude: 497m
Source 2: SCBM

Every month in Rawalpindi is marked by its own unique characteristics, conditions and weather pattern. Following is also a summary of each month's averages and records.

=== January ===
January is the coldest month in Rawalpindi with an average low of 3.1 °C (37.6 °F) and a record low of −3.9 °C (25.0 °F) recorded in 1967. Most days are clear blue skies, however this month is prone to foggy nights and mornings. Near zero visibility is experienced during extremely foggy nights that absolutely hampers air traffic and motorways. Western Disturbance brings cloudy days, rain and sometimes thunderstorms, which are essential for breaking long dry spells in the city experienced during this cool month. Moreover, it eliminates the conditions suitable for the formation of fog at night. Average rainfall for the month sums up to 67.1 millimetres (2.64 in) and a record rainfall of 166.9 millimetres (6.57 in) recorded in 1954. However, strong thunder/windstorm is uncommon during this month. The average high is 17.6 °C (63.7 °F) while a record high of 30.1 °C (86.2 °F) was recorded on 30 January 1995. Strong winds blow from the west during most clear days, but nights are calm with cool to cold temperatures. Snowfall is not uncommon in the margallahill as it happens after every few years or after a gap of 8 to 10 years. Rawalpindi has experienced significant snowfall events on rare occasions. One such notable instance was in 1929, followed by another 35 years later in January 1964. Rawalpindi saw snow again on February 20, 1984. The gap of 35 years between the 1929 and 1964 events highlights the infrequency of snowfall in the region. The 1929 snowfall was particularly remarkable, Peshawar also received substantial snowfall, a rare occurrence for the city. The temperature dropped to -4.2 °C during this event.da

=== February ===
February experiences similar weather to January except that usually it is a few degrees warmer. Most nights are cool and days are warm with an average low and high of 5.4 °C (41.7 °F) and 19.2 °C (66.6 °F), respectively. Overcast for several days is not uncommon during this month with the least amount of sunshine experienced during this month. A record high of 30.0 °C (86.0 °F) recorded on 28 February 1985, while the coldest −2.0 °C (28.4 °F) on 8 February 1978 have been recorded. Average rainfall is relatively greater than January totaling to 84.1 millimetres (3.31 in). In 2013, record rainfall of 306.1 millimetres (12.05 in) and a thunderstorms breakout was experienced from three western disturbances that caused bizarre conditions of frequent hailstorms and 93 kilometres per hour (58 mph) wind gusts. Moreover, hailstorms with thunderstorms are not a rare occurrence in this cool time of the year. Observations demonstrate that cold weather (below zero temperature) is not experienced after halfway through the month as plantation season officially begins during the last fortnight.

=== March ===
March has a splendid spring time feel in Rawalpindi with perfect warm temperatures of 23.7 °C (74.7 °F) during the day and cool crispy night temperatures averaging to 10.1 °C (50.2 °F). A freak heat wave was experienced in Rawalpindi with maximum temperature reaching36.0 °C (96.8 °F) on 20 March 2010, breaking the old record of 34.4 °C (93.9 °F) recorded exactly on the same day in 2002. An extreme minimum of −0.3 °C (31.5 °F) was recorded 17 March 1967. As spring season begins to settle, rainfall also increases from Western Disturbances accumulating to 92.4 millimetres (3.64 in). 2015 set a record rainfall of a massive 331.1 millimetres (13.04 in). A few strong thunderstorms develop every year during this month and sometimes these can accompanied by dust storms and gusts near hurricane force at 120 kilometres per hour (75 mph). Hailstorms are both greater in frequency and intensity during March and weather can quickly change during the day.

=== April ===
April in Rawalpindi transitions from warm to hot during day time, while night temperatures begin to move from cool to warm. Typically, late April sees a sharp rise in both the day and night time temperatures. Mean high during day time is 30.2 °C (86.4 °F), while nights enjoy a mean of 15.4 °C (59.7 °F). Record high for April is a very hot 40.6 °C (105.1 °F) recorded on 29 April 2006, on the other hand, a chilly low of 5.1 °C (41.2 °F) on 7 April 1994 have been witnessed. Western Disturbance is responsible for localized rainfall during this month, but typically these systems are not as strong as during March since rainfall totals 63.2 millimetres (2.49 in). Moreover, thunderstorms often cause horrid dust storms that become a frequent occurrence as the weather becomes drier, transitioning into summer. An average 1.0 dust storms are experienced in Rawalpindi (Average 1961-1991). On the other hand, record rainfall of 264.9 millimetres (10.43 in) was recorded in 1983. One such thunderstorm was blamed for the disaster of Bhoja Air jet, flight BHO-213 when a lightning strike or wind shear was blamed for the tragedy. A full report has yet to be released to the public. Heavy rain showers are rare during this month as dust storms frequently only cause drizzle or light scattered rain that makes the weather pleasant.

=== May ===
As May begins day time temperatures begin to rise and the day and night time temperature range is high during this time. It is categorized as a hot dry month with a record maximum of 45.6 °C (114.1 °F) experienced on 31 May 1988. Furthermore, during the record breaking heat wave of 2013 in Pakistan, near record temperature of 45.5 °C (113.9 °F) was recorded on 24 May 2013. This heat wave witnessed an average high of 37.4 °C (99.3 °F), which is 2.5 degrees higher than its average high of 34.9 °C (94.8 °F). Average minimum stands at 20.1 °C (68.2 °F) with record low of 10.1 °C (50.2 °F) experienced on 9 May 1997. Nevertheless, night time temperatures during heat waves could remain well above average with the warmest low of 28.0 °C (82.4 °F) recorded in 2013. Mid-May and June typically are the dry heat season. Thunderstorms that occur are typically strong, accompany heavy dust with blinding visibility and wind speed in excess of 130 kilometres per hour (81 mph) in some storms. These storms truly testify as "Kali Andhi", a common phrase used by the locals as they witness an average of 1.6 dust storms per year (average 1961-1991). Most storms occur during night time that brings relief from the relentless heat of the day. Rainfall however is scanty as the mean is only 34.1 millimetres (1.34 in), while 1965 was the wettest May at 115.3 millimetres (4.54 in). Wind speeds during this month are the second highest averaging to more than 16 kilometres per hour (9.9 mph).

=== June ===
June is undoubtedly the hottest month of the year. Most day time temperatures are excruciatingly hot with the maximum record temperature of 46.6 °C (115.9 °F) recorded on 23 June 2005 in Chaklala, Rawalpindi with an average high reaching 36.8 °C (98.2 °F). However, a maximum temperature of 47.8 °C (118.0 °F) was recorded in Saddar (city center) on 19 June 1952 and even that record was broken the following year on 13 June when the temperature soared to an astonishing 48.3 °C (118.9 °F). Heat waves experienced during this season often raises temperature to over 45 °C (113 °F). Nights are warm at an average of 24.2 °C (75.6 °F); however, during heat waves night time temperatures may not fall below 30 °C (86 °F) and begin to rise again soon after sunrise. The record low of 15.0 °C (59.0 °F) for June was experienced on 2 June 1979. June experiences the highest number of dust storms averaging 2.4 (average of 1961-1991). Thunderstorm activity is high and the city often experiences severe thunderstorms during this month. Rainfall for June averages 75.3 millimetres (2.96 in) and comes from both western disturbances, localized thunderstorms and monsoons. Record breaking wind speed for June was recorded on 5 June 2003 when a wind/thunderstorm broke havoc in the city with gusts up to 90 knots 167 kilometres per hour (104 mph) that caused most of the city to lose power and property damage. These powerful thunderstorms develop as a result of moist warm monsoon winds colliding with cool dry western disturbance creating monstrous thunderstorms accompanied with powerful microburst that cause extensive damage to billboards, pylons, roofs, crops and trees. Unfortunately, every year these wind storms kill as well. One such microburst of 85 knots was recorded by a weather station at Chaklala on 12 June 2012. Usually, late June welcomes the monsoon season which causes dew point to rise, and wind direction shifts from west to southeast. Relative humidity increases from these southeasterly winds that causes great discomfort without air conditioning as head indices (feels like) can rise in excess of 50 °C (122 °F). In 2008, the city experienced record rainfall of 255 millimetres (10.0 in). The month of June is also the windiest of all with an average wind speed of 17 kilometres per hour (11 mph).

=== July ===
July is the second wettest month with an average rainfall of 305.3 millimetres (12.02 in) as the monsoon activity increases. The highest rainfall ever recorded in a month accumulated to 743.3 millimetres (29.26 in) recorded in 1995 with very dramatic weather as rain was brought by severe thunderstorms and cloudburst. The highs are relatively cooler than June, but the heat index (feels like temperature) makes the heat all the more blistering with southeastern monsoons winds increasing dew point up to 28 °C (82 °F). The average high temperature for July is 35.3 °C (95.5 °F) categorized as hot, an extreme of 45.4 °C (113.7 °F) recorded on 3 July 2012. Nights are also warm at an average 24.4 °C (75.9 °F) since the temperature range is small during these humid months. However, a record low of 17.8 °C (64.0 °F) was experienced on 8 July 1966. Thunderstorm activity is the second highest during this month but most of the rumbling and anger of the clouds is heard at night. Rain showers can be extremely heavy at times especially during cloudburst events. Unprecedented flooding cannot be ruled out during such events. One such cloud burst took the twin cities by surprise also known as the 2001 Islamabad cloud burst, brought historic flash floods in the stream of "Nullah Lai" and brought tragic scenes to the city. This 100-year storm dropped Pakistan's highest 24-hour rainfall ever reported in the neighboring city of Islamabad accumulating to an astounding 620 millimetres (24 in), while Rawalpindi at Shamasabad (Northern Rawalpindi) received 335 millimetres (13.2 in) during the same storm, while Chaklala, Rawalpindi recorded 152 millimetres (6.0 in).

=== August ===
August is the wettest month with an average rainfall of 340.3 millimetres (13.40 in) as the monsoon peak during this month. August is a hot and humid month, however, thunderstorm activity reaches its peak primarily due to the monsoon. On average a thunderstorm happens every other day also attributing it as the wettest month of the year. Slightly lower mean maximum temperature of 33.7 °C (92.7 °F) is recorded, while average minimum of 23.8 °C (74.8 °F) has been observed. Record high temperature for August is 42 °C (108 °F) was recorded on 11 August 1987 and the record low of 17 °C (63 °F) on 3 August 1976. Similarly to July, some of the strongest thunderstorms are formed during this month that result in severe wind storms. One such powerful thunderstorm was reported from Northerly direction on 26 August 2005, which not only caused most of the city to lose power, but motorists faced hazardous conditions due to falling trees. Pakistan Meteorological Department recorded wind gusts of 90 knots or 167 kilometres per hour (104 mph). Record rainfall for the month is a massive 670.3 millimetres (26.39 in) recorded in 2013. Furthermore, it is not unusual to experience 150 millimetres (5.9 in)+ rain showers within 24 hours during July and August. The highest dew point was of 29 °C (84 °F) was recorded on the morning of 7 August 2015, which made the temperature of 32 °C (90 °F) felt like an oppressive 46 °C (115 °F). Flooding in lower elevations of the city is common as well. The temperature by mid August becomes comfortable enough that plantation season begins in the city.

=== September ===
September is cooler and relatively less humid than the subsequent two monsoon months. It is referred as a post monsoon month, which usually entertains less moisture than the peak season. However, Western Disturbance interact more with the monsoons during this month resulting in strong thunderstorm activity and heavy wind and rain. Not only do the temperatures begin to decrease from August, but the drop in humidity makes the outdoors more comfortable. This month holds plenty of sunshine as the average high of 33.7 °C (92.7 °F), while average low is recorded at 21.1 °C (70.0 °F). the record high and low temperature is 38.1 °C (100.6 °F) was recorded 5 September 1982, and 13.3 °C (55.9 °F) was recorded on 26 September 1984, respectively. Rainfall during this month is plenty at 110.7 millimetres (4.36 in). However, recent years have experienced a spike in post monsoon rainfall activity. On 14 September 2011, a severe thunderstorm struck Rawalpindi with a maximum gust of 85 knots (157 km/h) and caused torrential downpour recording a total of 105 millimetres (4.1 in) in a matter of couple of hours. In 2011, a total 281 millimetres (11.1 in) was recorded, which was at that time a recent record . However, in 2014, this monthly rainfall record shattered completely by a low air pressure system that moved and stalled over the North East Punjab region causing cloud burst conditions in some areas between 3 and 5 September. At Chaklala, the 24 hour rainfall was recorded at an astounding 298 millimetres (11.7 in), while Shamasabad weather station recorded 277 millimetres (10.9 in). The total accumulation for the month was 416.3 millimetres (16.39 in) setting a new record for 2014.

=== October ===
October is a warm and dry month with plenty of sunshine throughout the day. Humidity drops rapidly as the monsoons recede from the country and is replaced by westerly winds. Typically, wind speed increase around noon and usually dies down by night time. However, these winds are dry as western disturbance activity also drop significantly. Some of the lowest relative humidity values are experienced during this month. Therefore, average rainfall is scanty at 31.7 millimetres (1.25 in). Temperature range is high during this month as nights begin to enter the cool temperature range with warm sunny days. The average low is a cool at 14.5 °C (58.1 °F) while a warm 30.9 °C (87.6 °F) is the average high. Record high for the month is hot 37.8 °C (100.0 °F) recorded on 1 October 2009. and a record low of 5.7 °C (42.3 °F) has been recorded on 31 October 1984. The previous record rainfall for the month was a shy 95.8 millimetres (3.77 in) recorded in 1997. However, October is witnessing erratic rainfall patterns in recent years increasing its monthly average. One such example happened in 2015 between the 25th and 26th of the month when 132.5 millimetres (5.22 in) of rain fell in just 24 hours on 25 October 2015. This 24 hour accumulation alone was 4 times higher than monthly average of the month. The record set for 2015 totalled an impressive 199.2 millimetres (7.84 in).

=== November ===
November is a pleasant; however the driest month of the year as the mean rainfall is barely 14.4 millimetres (0.57 in). Therefore, relative humidity during this month is also the lowest throughout the year. This month receives the greatest amount of sunshine hours as overcast days during both October and November are very rare. Moreover, November demonstrates a continuation of very similar weather pattern observed in October, but with significantly cooler day and night temperatures. A few thundershowers cool down the weather further and officially sets cold weather during this month. But more recently, not only has the month exhibited warmer temperatures during the day and night, it is also becoming even drier. The average low for November is 8.3 °C (46.9 °F). Day temperature; however, due to high temperature range, is still warm at an average of 25.9 °C (78.6 °F) Record low for this month −0.6 °C (30.9 °F) recorded on 28 November 1970, while the record high of 32.2 °C (90.0 °F) has been recorded on 2 November 1999.

=== December ===
December is the second coldest month in Rawalpindi after January with a record low temperature of −2.8 °C (27.0 °F) recorded on 25 December 1984. The average low for the month is a chilly 4.3 °C (39.7 °F), while comfortable highs of 20.2 °C (68.4 °F) are typically recorded during the day. The record high has been recorded at 28.3 °C (82.9 °F) on 7 December 1998. Typically on a sunny day temperature range during the last three months can be in excess of 20.0 °C (68.0 °F) that results in the comfortable outside temperature during day time. During the least active weather periods, lack of rainfall, low wind speeds and cool temperatures during the month results in foggy/smoggy conditions during early morning times. It is the second least windiest month of the year. It is not uncommon for people of all age groups to enjoy the afternoon and evening sun because of its irreplaceable warmth. Western Disturbances begin to affect the city more frequently, but strong thunderstorms are rarely experienced. Mean rainfall increases significantly from the month of November to an average of 36.2 millimetres (1.43 in), most of which happens in the last fortnight of the month.

== Heat island effect ==
Like most major cities of Pakistan, Rawalpindi not only lack vegetation, but experiences a phenomenon known as the urban heat island effect. Urban Sprawl and lack of adequate vegetation has witnessed a rise in both day and especially night temperatures. Although some of the above normal temperatures can be attributed to climate change. However, in comparison to its green neighbour Islamabad, Rawalpindi can experience nights up to 2-5 °C warmer. During the recent years (after 2012), Rawalpindi on average is starting to experience warmer temperatures at an average of 1.5 degree Celsius. Not long ago (up until the late 1990s), Rawalpindi was merely 0.5 to maximum 1 degree Celsius warmer than its twin city, Islamabad. In 2015, during the month of May, Rawalpindi's night temperatures were on average 21.6 degrees Celsius, while Islamabad (only 8 kilometers north in a much vegetated area) recorded an average low of 18.1 degrees Celsius. To show the extremity of this phenomenon, on 8 May 2015, Islamabad experienced a minimum temperature of 18 degrees, while Rawalpindi recorded 25.5 degrees Celsius. This is the highest temperature difference experienced on a clear night between the two cities.

== Rare Snow events ==
The Last snowfall in Rawalpindi happened on 14 January 1964 the Snow was no more than two inches. After that no snowfall has been recorded in the city. Before that in 1950 Rawalpindi got snow as well. After that snow only on Margalla hills every 6 years. In 1909 Rawalpindi got snowfall, in 1914 Rawalpindi got 1.5 feet of snowfall. In 1929 there was a snow event in Rawalpindi where it got 1 inch of snow.

== Old Newspaper clip ==
Rawalpindi Pakistan jan 14- Rawalpindi experienced snowfall early Tuesday morning, the first in many years. Snow settled on rooftops, roads, and trees, accumulating about 1.5 inches. The temperature recorded was 30.2 °F (−1.0 °C).

Nearby Murree hills received 6 inches of snow, blocking the Murree Road. Snowfall was also reported in Jhelum, Taxila, and Chakwal, with temperatures dropping to 34 °F (1 °C).

It is recalled that the last Snow fell in Rawalpindi in February 1950.(citation needed). The oldest recorded snowfall was in 1909.

== See also ==
- Climate of Islamabad
- 2001 Islamabad cloud burst
- Climate of Pakistan
- List of extreme weather records in Pakistan
