= 2001 Islamabad cloud burst =

Record breaking rainfall in Pakistan

2001 Islamabad Cloudburst
Date of Occurrence	23 July 2001
Place	Islamabad, Rawalpindi, Hazara and Malakand Divisions
Deaths	61
Maximum Precipitation	620 millimetres (24 in), in Islamabad

On 23 July 2001, Islamabad experienced a record breaking 620 millimetres (24 in) of rainfall, which was the 24 hours heaviest rainfall in Pakistan during the past 100 years. Continuous downpour lasted for about 10 hours from 0600 to 1600 PST in Islamabad and Rawalpindi, caused the worst ever Flash flood in the local stream called Nulla Lai and its tributaries of Rawalpindi, which not only flood the low-lying areas of the twin cities but swept away the banks of the stream and buildings built in the encroachments. Islamabad's twin city, Rawalpindi experienced 335 millimetres (13.2 in) of rain during this event.

== Causes ==
The cloud burst was the result of the sequel of vigorously developed cloud due to the combined effect of well marked westerly trough (Westerly wave), passing over 500hpa with enough supply of moisture from southwest monsoon.

A surface low pressure formed over Hazara and Malakand division between 34-37ºN and 70-75ºE with central pressure less than 996 hpa. There was a gradually accentuating upper air westerly trough at 500 hpa between 40-50ºN and 60-70ºE and there were strong monsoon incursions from the Arabian Sea and the Bay of Bengal while the southwesterly monsoon current from the Arabian Sea showed strong convergence over Islamabad, Rawalpindi District and Hazara and Malakand Divisions and the presence of a strong southeasterly monsoon current from along the foothills of the Himalayas caused the cloudburst over the twin cities of Rawalpindi/Islamabad.

Rainfall recorded by Pakistan Meteorological Department in different locations of Islamabad and Rawalpindi is detailed below.

Name of Station	Location	0500–0800 PST	0800–1100 PST	1100–1400 PST	1400–1700 PST	Total Rainfall from 0500 to 1700 PST
PMD Headquarters	Islamabad	42 millimetres (1.7 in)	132 millimetres (5.2 in)	400 millimetres (16 in)	46 millimetres (1.8 in)	620 millimetres (24 in)
Saidpur	Islamabad	103 millimetres (4.1 in)	Did not measure	Did not measure	314 millimetres (12.4 in)	417 millimetres (16.4 in)
Shamsabad	Rawalpindi	04 millimetres (0.16 in)	83 millimetres (3.3 in)	200 millimetres (7.9 in)	48 millimetres (1.9 in)	335 millimetres (13.2 in)
Airport	Rawalpindi	Traces	06 millimetres (0.24 in)	65 millimetres (2.6 in)	99 millimetres (3.9 in)	170 millimetres (6.7 in)

== Aftermath ==
Pakistan Meteorological Department issued heavy rainfall forecast in its Weather Broadcast Bulletin a day earlier and Flash flood Warning was issued almost 4–5 hours in advance. Due to the continuous heavy downpour, the Nullah Lai and its tributaries over flooded and inundated the nearby houses, bridges and roads. According to the official figures, at least 10 people died, 800 houses were destroyed and 1,069 houses were damaged in Islamabad. Over all 61 people died of the catastrophe.

== See also ==
- Climate of Islamabad
- Climate of Rawalpindi
- Climate of Pakistan
