= Cyclones BOB 03 and Yemyin =

North Indian Ocean deep depression and cyclonic storm in 2007

Deep Depression BOB 03 Cyclonic Storm Yemyin
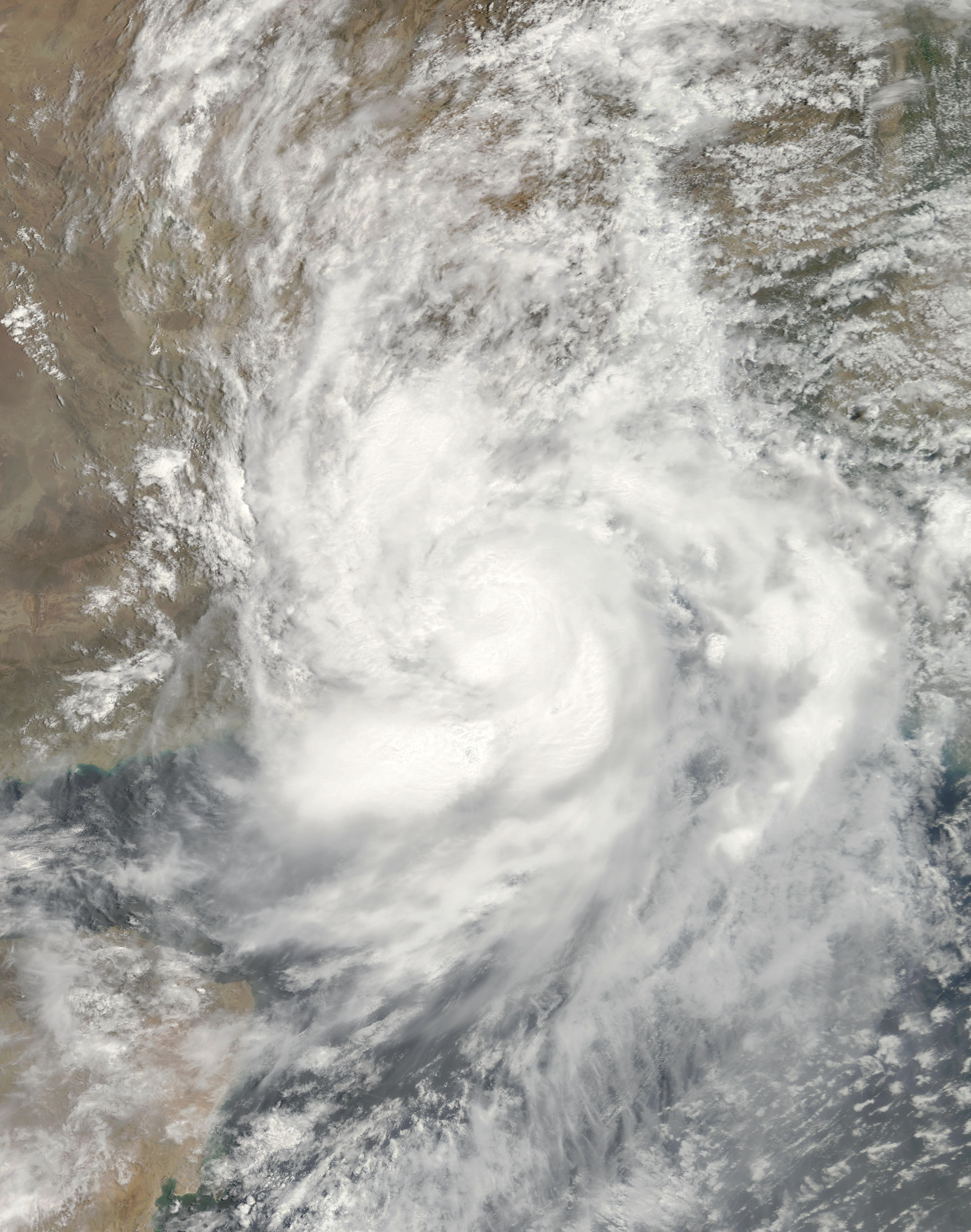
- Yemyin after landfall in Pakistan on 26 June

Meteorological history
- as Deep Depression BOB 03
- Formed: 21 June 2007
- Dissipated: 23 June 2007

Deep depression
- 3-minute sustained (IMD)
- Highest winds: 55 km/h (35 mph)
- Lowest pressure: 988 hPa (mbar); 29.18 inHg

Tropical depression
- 1-minute sustained (SSHWS/JTWC)
- Highest winds: 55 km/h (35 mph)
- Lowest pressure: 994 hPa (mbar); 29.35 inHg

Meteorological history
- as Cyclonic Storm Yemyin
- Formed: 25 June 2007
- Dissipated: 26 June 2007

Cyclonic storm
- 3-minute sustained (IMD)
- Highest winds: 65 km/h (40 mph)
- Lowest pressure: 986 hPa (mbar); 29.12 inHg

Tropical storm
- 1-minute sustained (SSHWS/JTWC)
- Highest winds: 95 km/h (60 mph)
- Lowest pressure: 985 hPa (mbar); 29.09 inHg

Overall effects
- Fatalities: 983
- Damage: $2.1 billion (2007 USD)
- Areas affected: India, Pakistan, Afghanistan
- Part of the 2007 North Indian Ocean cyclone season

Deep Depression BOB 03 and Cyclonic Storm Yemyin (Note: The name Yemyin (Burmese: ရေမြင်း; [jè.mjɪ́ɴ]) was contributed by Myanmar and means "hippopotamus" in Burmese.) (JTWC designation: 03B) were a pair of deadly tropical cyclones that made landfalls on India and Pakistan in June 2007. The Pakistan Meteorological Department referred to both as Tropical Cyclone 03B, naming it "Tropical Cyclone Yemyin". At the time, the official WMO body responsible for tropical cyclones in the Arabian Sea, the India Meteorological Department (IMD), did not name them. However, the IMD reassessed the second system to have reached cyclonic storm strength, and retroactively named it Yemyin.

Throughout three countries, 983 people were killed: 730 in Pakistan, 140 in India, and 113 in Afghanistan. In all, the storms wrought roughly $2.1 billion in damage in India and Pakistan.

== Meteorological history ==
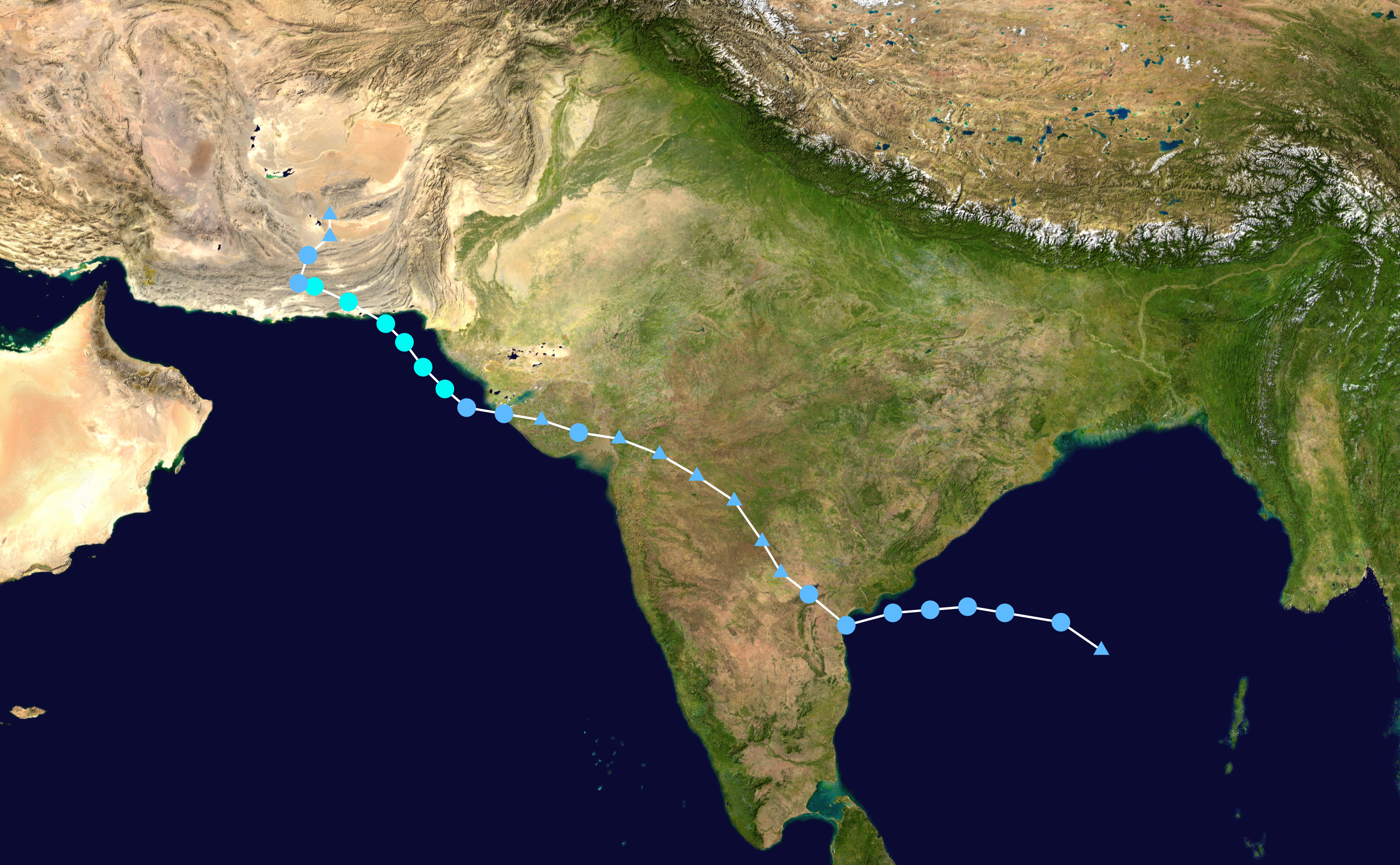
Map plotting the storm's track and intensity, according to the Saffir–Simpson scale Map key Saffir–Simpson scale Tropical depression (≤38 mph, ≤62 km/h) Tropical storm (39–73 mph, 63–118 km/h) Category 1 (74–95 mph, 119–153 km/h) Category 2 (96–110 mph, 154–177 km/h) Category 3 (111–129 mph, 178–208 km/h) Category 4 (130–156 mph, 209–251 km/h) Category 5 (≥157 mph, ≥252 km/h) Unknown Storm type Tropical cyclone Subtropical cyclone Extratropical cyclone, remnant low, tropical disturbance, or monsoon depression

A low-pressure area associated with the monsoon trough was first detected by the Naval Research Laboratory in the Bay of Bengal on 17 June. Over the next few days, it developed a deep flaring convection near an exposed low-level circulation centre (LLCC) as it drifted in the open sea. Despite moderate to high vertical wind shear, the disturbance produced surface pressure falls of up to 2.7 mbar (hPa) in Port Blair, in the Andaman Islands, on 19 June. Convection persisted around the increasingly well-defined LLCC, and the disturbance continued to consolidate under favourable diffluence.

Early on 21 June, the India Meteorological Department (IMD) declared the area a depression, 430 km (270 mi) east-southeast of Kakinada, Andhra Pradesh, India. Several hours later, the Joint Typhoon Warning Center (JTWC) issued a Tropical Cyclone Formation Alert (TCFA), with winds near 30 knots (56 km/h; 35 mph). The depression moved quickly west-northwest towards the northern Andhra Pradesh coast. A subtropical ridge to the north weakened the wind shear which had been hindering the storm's development, allowing for further intensification. Later that day, the IMD upgraded the system to a deep depression. As convection organised with increasing ocean heat content, the JTWC issued its first warning on Tropical Cyclone 03B.

The deep depression made landfall near Kakinda early on 22 June local time. The JTWC issued its final advisory later, as the system began to weaken due to land interaction and wind shear. The next day, the IMD downgraded it to a depression while it crossed the Deccan Plateau. The final warning was issued on 24 June, despite the storm having moved into the Arabian Sea.

The JTWC noted in its Significant Tropical Weather Outlook for the North Indian Ocean on 24 June that strong monsoonal low-level flow contributed to increased cyclonic vorticity, with low vertical wind shear and warm sea surface temperatures. It warned that these factors could lead to a rapid regeneration of the cyclone. Early on 25 June, the JTWC issued the second TCFA for this system as its LLCC crossed the coast into the Arabian Sea. Shortly after the JTWC resumed advisories on the depression, while IMD considered it as a separate system from BOB 03.

As it moved northwest just off the Pakistani coast, winds of about 26 knots (48 km/h; 30 mph) and a surface pressure of 990 mbar (hPa) were observed in Karachi near midday on 25 June. According to the PMD, the centre of the system reached within 90 km (56 mi) of Karachi. With favourable conditions and deep convection, the system intensified into a deep depression that day. After further organization, it made its second landfall at about 0300 UTC 26 June along the Makran coast, near Ormara and Pasni, Balochistan Province, in southwestern Pakistan. Upon reaching land, the cyclone began to weaken slowly, and the JTWC issued its last advisory late on 26 June.

== Impact ==
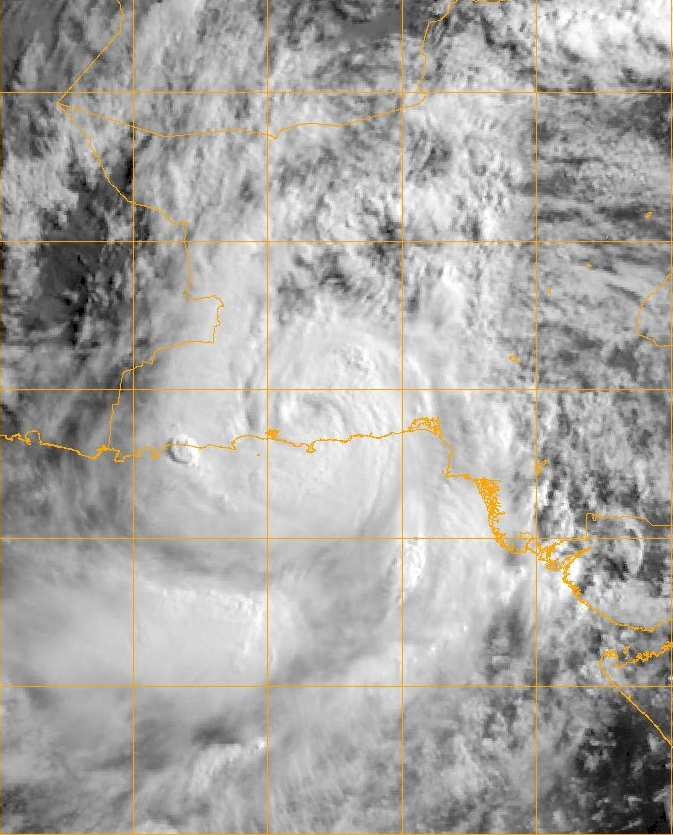
Cyclone Yemyin making landfall in the Balochistan Province

=== Pakistan ===
In Karachi, Pakistan, about 213 people died from rains and winds of 111 km/h (69 mph) caused by BOB 03 that might have been associated with an outer band of the cyclone. The Pakistan Meteorological Department (PMD) had warned of heavy rains and wind from the system as early as Friday, 22 June.

Yemyin trapped 2 merchant ships: Al-Picaso and Lady Hamad, and 4 fishing boats: Al-Taif, Al-Noor, Sumbal Sultani, and Al-Tariq, 100 nautical miles (190 km; 120 mi) off Karachi. The Pakistan Navy rescued 56 sailors from the merchant ships and 36 fishermen from the fishing boats after they were detected by Breguet Atlantique aircraft. The heavy downpour also flooded the Kech Korandi riverine, inundating the city of Turbat and causing more than 10,000 people to evacuate their houses. At least 380 people died in Balochistan, with another 250 dead in Sindh and 100 in the North-West Frontier Province, and further rains associated with the remnants of the cyclone hampered rescue efforts. The cyclone affected at least 10 districts of Balochistan and 4 districts of Sindh, affecting the lives of at least 1.5 million people. At least 2 million people were affected by the cyclone. More than 2 million livestock, worth over 4 billion rupees, were killed by the storm.

=== India ===
BOB 03 killed at least 140 people in India, while it was still in the Bay of Bengal. Property losses from the storm were estimated at 24 billion rupees.

=== Afghanistan ===
Over 80 people were killed in floods associated with the remnants of Yemyin in Afghanistan.

== Naming ==
The PMD referred to the deep depression as Tropical Cyclone Yemyin, the next name on the list at the time. The IMD, the official Regional Specialized Meteorological Centre for the North Indian Ocean, did not operationally upgrade or name the system due to intense Indo-Pakistani relations. However, on 6 August, the IMD reassessed the deep depression to have reached cyclonic storm strength, and retroactively designated the system as Cyclonic Storm Yemyin in its mid-season review. This was confirmed by the designation of Cyclonic Storm Sidr, the next name on the list after Yemyin, in November.

== See also ==
- List of tropical cyclone records
- List of wettest known tropical cyclones in Pakistan
- Timeline of the 2007 North Indian Ocean cyclone season
- Cyclones Gulab and Shaheen (2021), another storm which took a similar path through India and regenerated into another tropical cyclone in the Arabian Sea from the Bay of Bengal before hitting Oman
