= 2011 Balochistan floods =

2021 floods in Balochistan, Pakistan

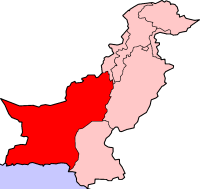
- Location of Balochistan
- Date: 28 February - 4 March
- Location: Northern and Central Balochistan province
- Deaths: At least 3 dead, 100 homeless

The 2011 Balochistan floods started from the last week of February and continued until the first week of March. Pakistan's Balochistan province was already badly affected from the previous year's devastating floods as UNHCR claimed that 166,000 flood victims were still homeless in the province and 240 people still living in camps.

== Meteorological history ==
The Pakistan Meteorological Department issued a weather advisory in which it warned that a Western Disturbance over Iran was likely to enter in Balochistan that would cause widespread rains with isolated heavy rainfalls over Balochistan for four days. The system entered Balochistan on 28 February and caused widespread heavy rainfall in the province whereas moderate rainfall elsewhere in the country. The system moved and entered India on 5 March.

== Flooding and impact ==
Hundred people were rendered homeless when a large number of houses were washed away by flash floods caused by torrential rain in Quetta and other areas in northern and central Balochistan. Traffic between Ziarat and Loralai via Sanjavi was suspended after heavy snowfall in the valley as four feet of snow fell in the hilly areas of Ziarat and about six inches in the town in 24 hours. At least 70 houses were washed away by hill torrents in Nushki and over a dozen houses collapsed in Huda and Khrotabad areas of Quetta. Floodwaters entered a large number of houses. Parts of Chagai district were also affected. The Bour Nullah entering Nushki from Afghanistan inundated thousands of acres of land in Dak area. At least 25 mud-houses were washed away in Chagai tehsil. A bridge on the Quetta-Karachi National Highway was washed away near Mastung.

On February 28 the provincial capital was lashed by strong hailstorms followed by heavy rainfall. During the six-day wet spell the highest rainfall in 24 hours was 45 millimetres (1.8 in) that was recorded on March 1, 2011.

=== Heavy precipitation during late February and early March ===
Heavy precipitation recorded during the six-day wet spell of February 28 to March 5, 2011 in the province based on data from the Pakistan Meteorological Department.

City	Rainfall (mm)	Rainfall (in)	Notes	References
Samungli	93	4.0	The highest rainfall during 24 hours was 47 millimetres (1.9 in).	
Quetta	92	3.7	The highest rainfall during 24 hours was 45 millimetres (1.8 in).	
Khuzdar	86	3.3	The highest rainfall during 24 hours was 33 millimetres (1.3 in).	
Kalat	74	3.0	The highest rainfall during 24 hours was 32 millimetres (1.3 in).	
Zhob	32	1.2	The highest rainfall during 24 hours was 19 millimetres (0.75 in).	

== Response by the Pakistan Government ==
Minister for Provincial Disaster Management Authority (PDMA) Babu Mohammad Rahim Mengal said a relief operation had been launched. The minister in charge of the PDMA visited the affected area in Nushki and said 200 blankets, 200 tents and food items had been sent to Nushki and Chagai districts. Balochistan Chief Minister Nawab Aslam Raisani ordered the officials concerned to immediately send relief goods for the affected people. He said relief camps would be set up in government buildings for displaced people.

== See also ==
- 2010 Pakistan floods
- 2011 Balochistan earthquake
- List of floods in Pakistan
