= Emergency management =

Dealing with all humanitarian aspects of emergencies

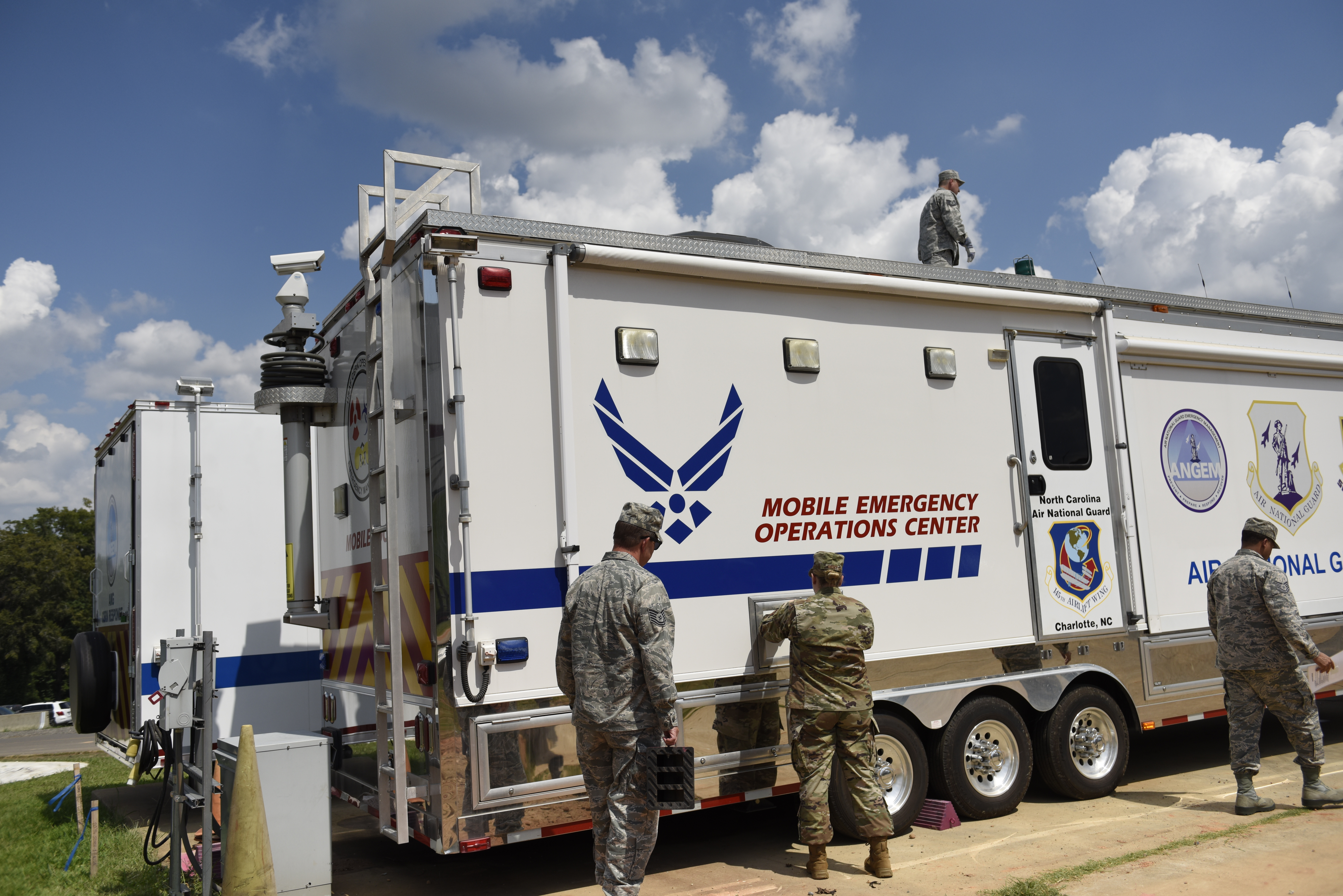
A mobile emergency operations center, in this case operated by the Air National Guard.

Disaster management (also called emergency management or emergency preparedness) is the systematic reduction of a community's vulnerability to natural and man-made hazards as well as the coordinated response to disasters after they occur. Emergency management focuses on destructive events that overwhelm a community's ability to handle on its own, such as hurricanes, pandemics, and terrorism. Professional emergency management activities include search and rescue, providing for the basic needs of affected individuals, and issuing evacuation alerts. The management of disasters requires collaboration between individuals, households, non-governmental organizations, and local, provincial, and federal governments.

Although many different terminologies exist globally, the activities of emergency management can be generally categorized into preparedness, response, mitigation, and recovery, although other terms such as disaster risk reduction and prevention are also common. The outcome of emergency management is to prevent disasters and where this is not possible, to reduce their harmful impacts.

== Emergency planning ideals ==
Emergency planning aims to prevent emergencies from occurring, and failing that, initiates an efficient action plan to mitigate the results and effects of any emergencies. The development of emergency plans is a cyclical process, common to many risk management disciplines, such as business continuity and security risk management, wherein recognition or identification of risks as well as ranking or evaluation of risks are important to prepare. Also, there are a number of guidelines and publications regarding emergency planning, published by professional organizations such as ASIS International, National Fire Protection Association (NFPA), and the International Association of Emergency Managers (IAEM).

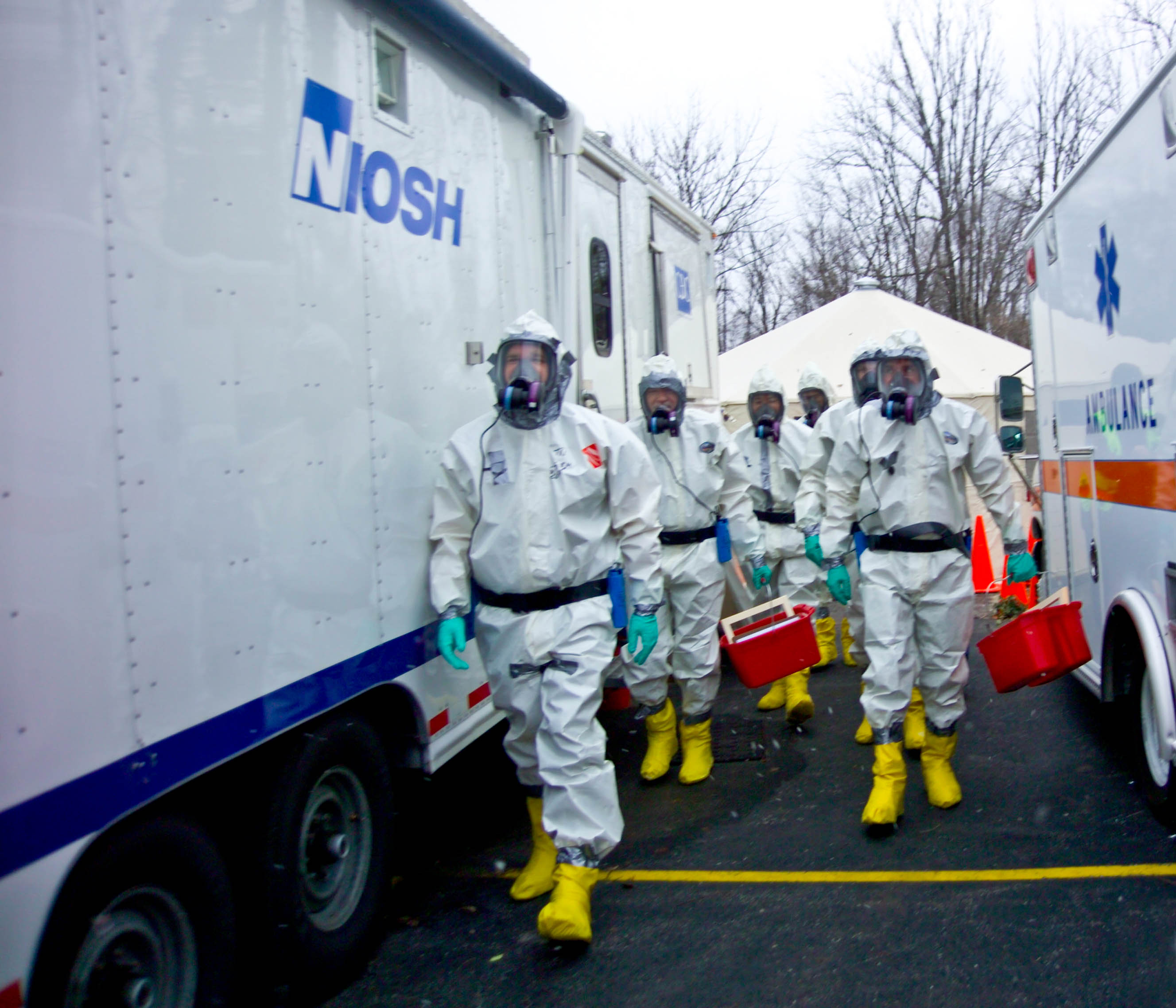
A team of emergency responders performs a training scenario involving anthrax.

Emergency management plans and procedures should include the identification of appropriately trained staff members responsible for decision-making when an emergency occurs. Training plans should include internal people, contractors and civil protection partners, and should state the nature and frequency of training and testing. Testing a plan's effectiveness should occur regularly; in instances where several businesses or organizations occupy the same space, joint emergency plans, formally agreed to by all parties, should be put into place.

Safety drills are often held in preparation for foreseeable hazards such as fires, tornadoes, lockdown for protection, and earthquakes, with the participation of both emergency services and people who will be affected. In the U.S., the Government Emergency Telecommunications Service supports federal, state, local and tribal government personnel, industry and non-governmental organizations during a crisis or emergency by providing emergency access and priority handling for local and long-distance calls over the public switched telephone network.

== Health and safety of workers ==
Cleanup during disaster recovery involves many occupational hazards. Often, these hazards are exacerbated by the conditions of the local environment as a result of the natural disaster. Employers are responsible for minimizing exposure to these hazards and protecting workers when possible, including identification and thorough assessment of potential hazards, application of appropriate personal protective equipment (PPE), and the distribution of other relevant information in order to enable the safe performance of work.

=== Physical exposures ===
Flooding disasters often expose workers to trauma from sharp and blunt objects hidden under murky waters that cause lacerations and open and closed fractures. These injuries are further exacerbated with exposure to the often contaminated waters, leading to increased risk for infection. The risk of hypothermia significantly increases with prolonged exposure to water temperatures less than 75 degrees Fahrenheit (24 °C). Non-infectious skin conditions may also occur, including miliaria, immersion foot syndrome (including trench foot), and contact dermatitis.

Earthquake-associated injuries are related to building structural components, including falling debris with possible crush injury, burns, electric shock, and being trapped under rubble.

=== Chemical exposures ===
Chemicals can pose a risk to human health when exposed to humans in certain quantities. After a natural disaster, certain chemicals can become more prominent in the environment. These hazardous materials can be released directly or indirectly. Chemical hazards directly released after a natural disaster often occur at the same time as the event, impeding planned actions for mitigation. Indirect release of hazardous chemicals can be intentionally released or unintentionally released. An example of intentional release is insecticides used after a flood or chlorine treatment of water after a flood. These chemicals can be controlled through engineering to minimize their release when a natural disaster strikes; for example, agrochemicals from inundated storehouses or manufacturing facilities poisoning the floodwaters or asbestos fibers released from a building collapse during a hurricane. The flowchart to the right has been adopted from research performed by Stacy Young et al.

=== Biological exposures ===
Exposure to mold is commonly seen after a natural disaster such as flooding, hurricane, tornado or tsunami. Mold growth can occur on both the exterior and interior of residential or commercial buildings. Warm and humid conditions encourage mold growth. While the exact number of mold species is unknown, some examples of commonly found indoor molds are Aspergillus, Cladosporium, Alternaria and Penicillium. Reaction to molds differ between individuals and can range from mild symptoms such as eye irritation, cough to severe life-threatening asthmatic or allergic reactions. People with history of chronic lung disease, asthma, allergy, other breathing problems or those that are immunocompromised could be more sensitive to molds and may develop fungal pneumonia. Some methods to prevent mold growth after a natural disaster include opening all doors and windows, using fans to dry out the building, positioning fans to blow air out of the windows, cleaning up the building within the first 24–48 hours, and moisture control. When removing molds, N-95 masks or respirators with a higher protection level should be used to prevent inhalation of molds into the respiratory system. Molds can be removed from hard surfaces by soap and water, a diluted bleach solution or commercial products.

For workers in direct contact with human remains, universal precautions should be exercised in order to prevent unnecessary exposure to blood-borne viruses and bacteria. Relevant PPE includes eye protection, face mask or shield, and gloves. The predominant health risk are gastrointestinal infections through fecal–oral contamination, so hand hygiene is paramount to prevention. Mental health support should also be available to workers who endure psychological stress during and after recovery.

Flood waters are often contaminated with bacteria and waste and chemicals. Prolonged, direct contact with these waters leads to an increased risk for skin infection, especially with open wounds in the skin or a history of a previous skin condition, such as atopic dermatitis or psoriasis. These infections are exacerbated with a compromised immune system or an aging population. The most common bacterial skin infections are usually with Staphylococcus and Streptococcus. One of the most uncommon, but well-known bacterial infections is from Vibrio vulnificus, which causes a rare, but often fatal infection called necrotizing fasciitis.

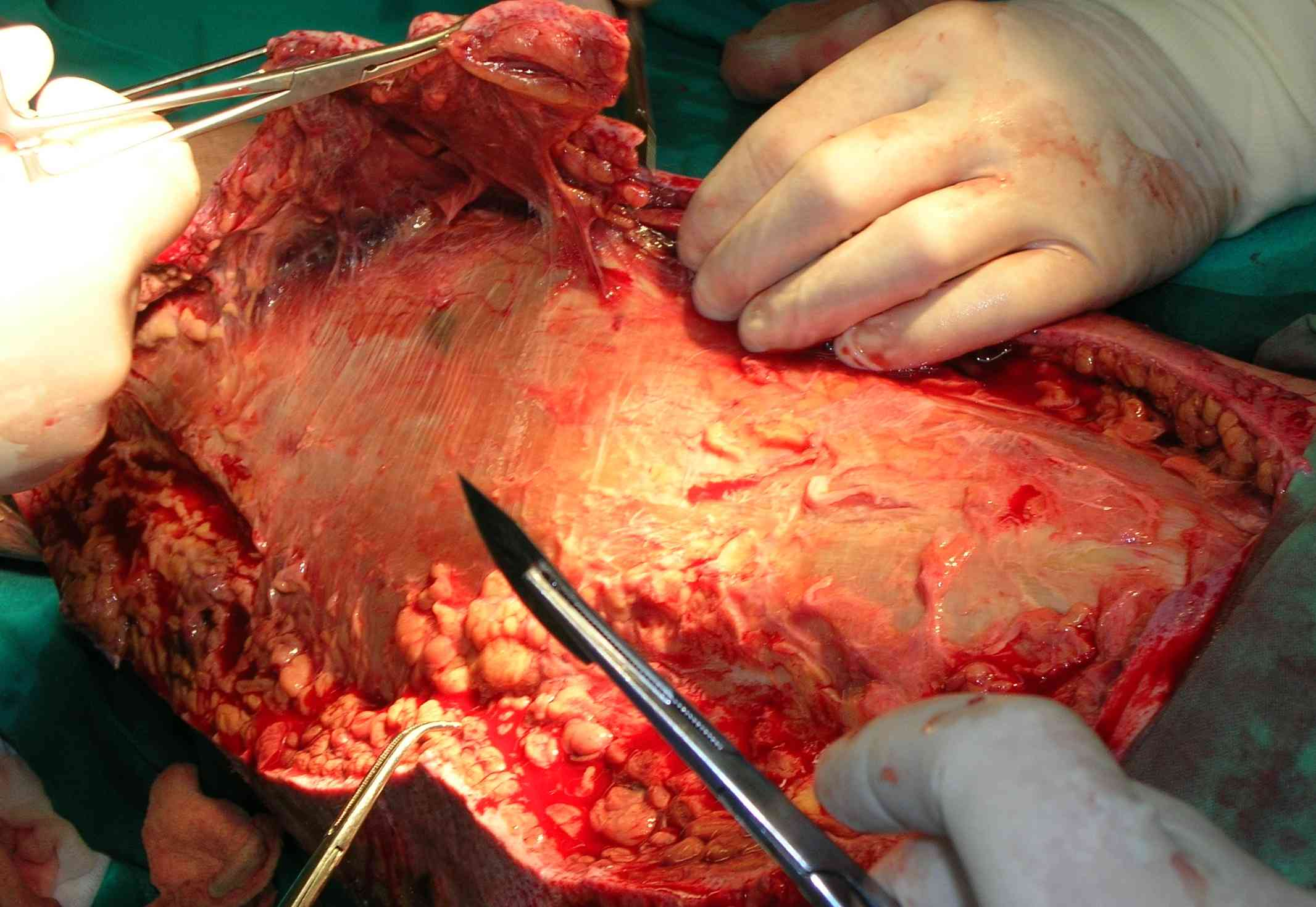
Surgical debridement of left leg necrotizing fasciitis.

Other salt-water Mycobacterium infections include the slow growing M. marinum and fast growing M. fortuitum, M. chelonae, and M. abscessus. Fresh-water bacterial infections include Aeromonas hydrophila, Burkholderia pseudomallei causing melioidosis, leptospira interrogans causing leptospirosis, and chromobacterium violaceum. Fungal infections may lead to chromoblastomycosis, blastomycosis, mucormycosis, and dermatophytosis. Other numerous arthropod, protozoal, and parasitic infections have been described. A worker can reduce the risk of flood-associated skin infections by avoiding the water if an open wound is present, or at minimum, cover the open wound with a waterproof bandage. Should contact with flood water occur, the open wound should be washed thoroughly with soap and clean water.

=== Psychosocial exposures ===
According to the CDC, "Sources of stress for emergency responders may include witnessing human suffering, risk of personal harm, intense workloads, life-and-death decisions, and separation from family." Substance Abuse and Mental Health Services Administration (SAMHSA) provides stress prevention and management resources for disaster recovery responders.

=== Employer responsibilities ===
When an emergency situation occurs, employers may be expected to protect workers from all harm resulting from any potential hazard, including physical, chemical, and biological exposure. An employer should provide pre-emergency training and build an emergency action plan (EAP).

Employers should train their employees annually before an emergency action plan is implemented to inform employees of their responsibilities and/or plan of action during emergency situations. The training program should include the types of emergencies that may occur, the appropriate response, evacuation procedure, warning/reporting procedure, and shutdown procedures. Training requirements are different depending on the size of workplace and workforce, processes used, materials handled, available resources and who will be in charge during an emergency.

After the emergency action plan is completed, the employer and employees should review the plan carefully and post it in a public area that is accessible to everyone.

== Phases and personal activities ==
Emergency management consists of five phases: prevention, mitigation, preparedness, response and recovery.

=== Prevention ===
Preventive measures are taken at the domestic and international levels and are designed to provide permanent protection from disasters. The risk of loss of life and injury can be mitigated with good evacuation plans, environmental planning, and design standards. An example of this is pandemic prevention.

Build a minimum of two feet to five above the 100 year flood level, or build to the 500 year flood height.

In January 2005, 168 Governments adopted a 10-year plan to make the world safer from natural hazards at the World Conference on Disaster Reduction, held in Kobe, Hyogo, Japan, the results of which were adapted in a framework called the Hyogo Framework for Action.

=== Mitigation strategy ===
Disaster mitigation measures are those that eliminate or reduce the impacts and risks of hazards through proactive measures taken before an emergency or disaster occurs.

Preventive or mitigation measures vary for different types of disasters. In earthquake prone areas, these preventive measures might include structural changes such as the installation of an earthquake valve to instantly shut off the natural gas supply, seismic retrofits of property, and the securing of items inside a building. The latter may include the mounting of furniture, refrigerators, water heaters and breakables to the walls, and the addition of cabinet latches. In flood prone areas, houses can be built on stilts. In areas prone to prolonged electricity black-outs installation of a generator ensures continuation of electrical service. The construction of storm cellars and fallout shelters are further examples of personal mitigative actions.

The safe room is a reinforced structure to provide near absolute protection in extreme wind events such as tornadoes and hurricanes.

If one window or door breaks, the roof is more likely to blow off due to the pressure wind coming into the house. Closing all interior doors, reduces the forces on the roof. Doors, windows, and roofs rated for 195 mph (314 km/h) winds are stronger during hurricanes, typhoons and tornadoes. Hurricane-rated garage doors and rolling and accordion shutters at windows can reduce damages.

=== Preparedness ===
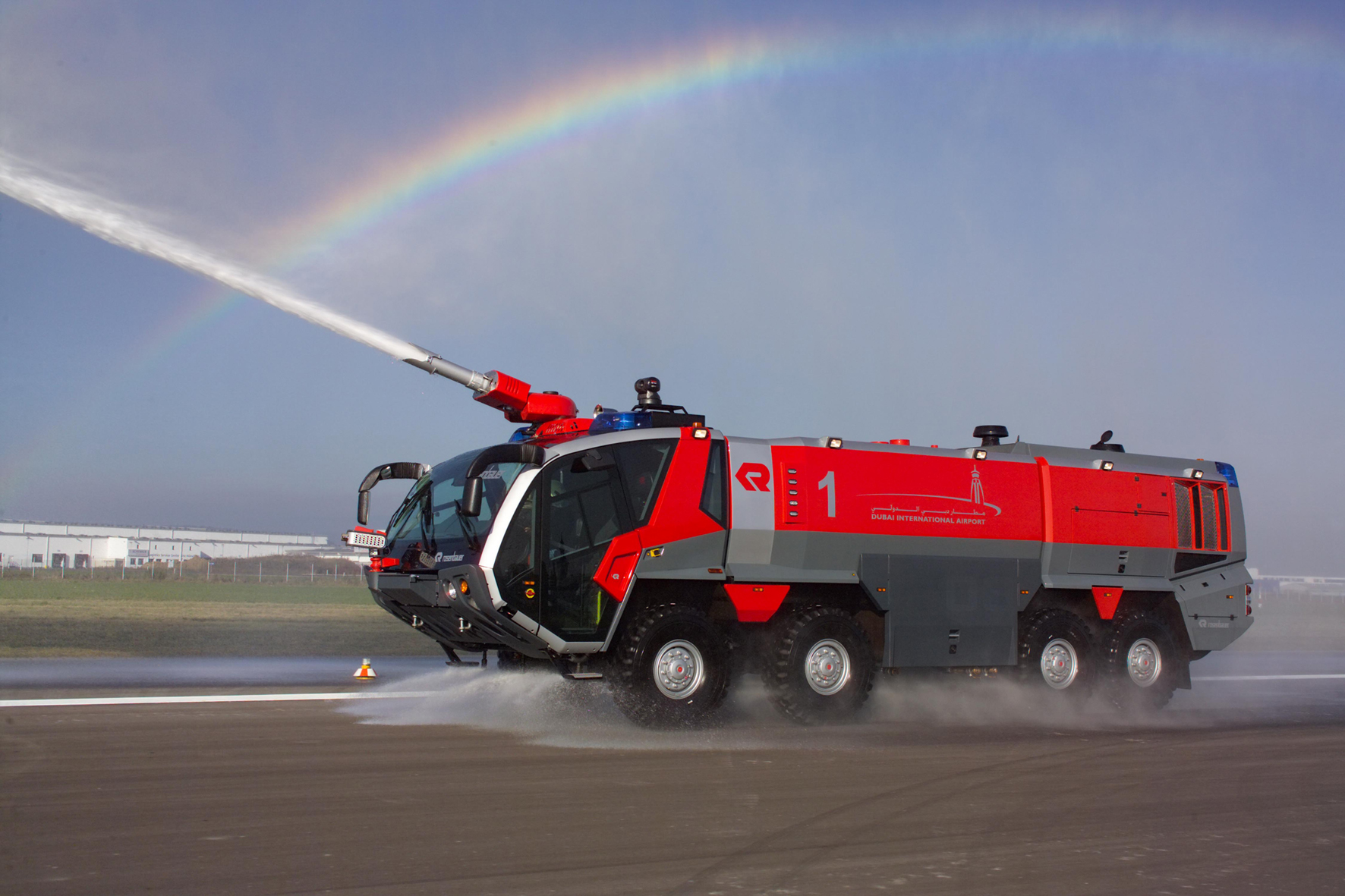
An airport emergency preparedness exercise.

Preparedness focuses on preparing equipment and procedures for use when a disaster occurs. The equipment and procedures can be used to reduce vulnerability to disaster, to mitigate the impacts of a disaster, or to respond more efficiently in an emergency. The US Federal Emergency Management Agency (FEMA) proposed out a basic four-stage vision of preparedness flowing from mitigation to preparedness to response to recovery and back to mitigation in a circular planning process. This circular, overlapping model has been modified by other agencies, taught in emergency classes, and discussed in academic papers.

FEMA also operates a Building Science Branch that develops and produces multi-hazard mitigation guidance that focuses on creating disaster-resilient communities to reduce loss of life and property. FEMA advises people to prepare their homes with some emergency essentials in the event food distribution lines are interrupted. FEMA has subsequently prepared for this contingency by purchasing hundreds of thousands of freeze-dried food emergency meals ready-to-eat (MREs) to dispense to the communities where emergency shelter and evacuations are implemented. Some guidelines for household preparedness were published online by the State of Colorado on the topics of water, food, tools, and so on.

Emergency preparedness can be difficult to measure. CDC focuses on evaluating the effectiveness of its public health efforts through a variety of measurement and assessment programs.

==== Preparedness paradox ====
The preparedness paradox is the idea that the more an individual or society prepares for a disaster, pandemic, or catastrophe; the less the harm if and when that event occurs. Because the harm was minimized, the people then wonder whether the preparation was necessary.

Disaster preparation can be hampered by several cognitive biases and features of certain types of disasters:

==== Preparedness measures ====
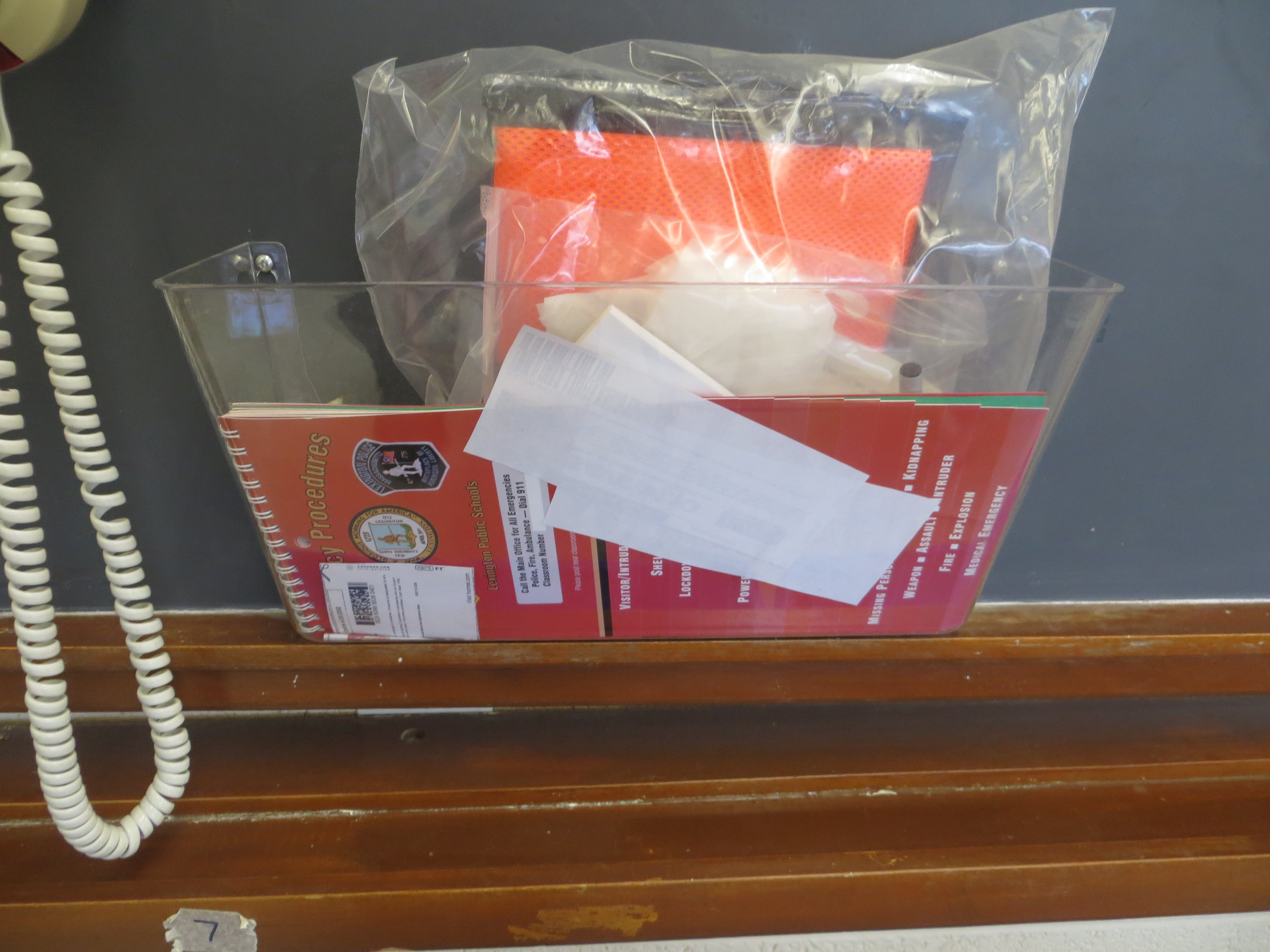
Equipment: classroom response kit.

Preparedness measures can take many forms ranging from focusing on individual people, locations or incidents to broader, government-based "all hazard" planning. There are a number of preparedness stages between "all hazard" and individual planning, generally involving some combination of both mitigation and response planning. Business continuity planning encourages businesses to have a Disaster Recovery Plan. Community- and faith-based organizations mitigation efforts field response teams and inter-agency planning.

School-based response teams cover everything from live shooters to gas leaks and nearby bank robberies. Educational institutions plan for cyberattacks and windstorms. Industry specific guidance exists for horse farms, boat owners and more. A 2013 survey found that only 19% of American families felt that they were "very prepared" for a disaster.

The basic theme behind preparedness is to be ready for an emergency and there are a number of different variations of being ready based on an assessment of what sort of threats exist. Nonetheless, there is basic guidance for preparedness that is common despite an area's specific dangers. FEMA recommends that everyone have a three-day survival kit for their household. The CDC has its own list for a proper disaster supply kit.

Emergency equipment in a Seoul subway station.

Like children, people with disabilities and other special needs have special emergency preparation needs. Depending on the disability, specific emergency preparations may be required. FEMA's suggestions for people with disabilities include having copies of prescriptions, charging devices for medical devices such as motorized wheelchairs and a week's supply of medication readily available or in a "go stay kit". In some instances, a lack of competency in English may lead to special preparation requirements and communication efforts for both individuals and responders.

The United States Department of Energy states that "homeowners, business owners, and local leaders may have to take an active role in dealing with energy disruptions on their own." This active role may include installing or other procuring generators that are either portable or permanently mounted and run on fuels such as propane or natural gas or gasoline.

The United States Department of Health and Human Services addresses specific emergency preparedness issues hospitals may have to respond to, including maintaining a safe temperature, providing adequate electricity for life support systems and even carrying out evacuations under extreme circumstances. FEMA encourages all businesses to have an emergency response plan and the Small Business Administration specifically advises small business owners to also focus emergency preparedness and provides a variety of different worksheets and resources.

In addition to emergency supplies and training for various situations, FEMA offers advice on how to mitigate disasters. The Agency gives instructions on how to retrofit a home to minimize hazards from a flood, to include installing a backflow prevention device, anchoring fuel tanks and relocating electrical panels.

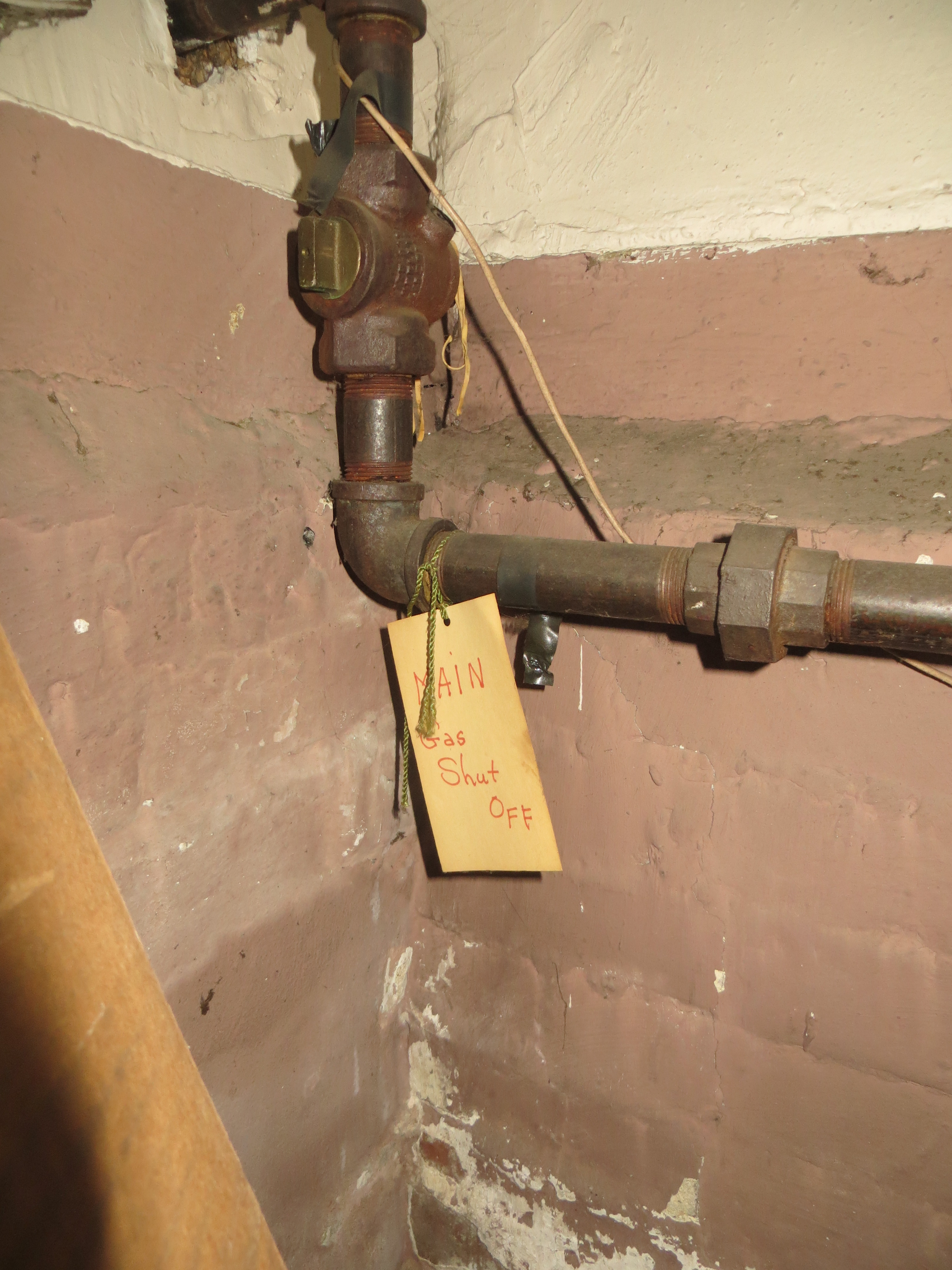
Marked gas shut off.

Given the explosive danger posed by natural gas leaks, Ready.gov states unequivocally that "It is vital that all household members know how to shut off natural gas" and that property owners must ensure they have any special tools needed for their particular gas hookups. Ready.gov also notes that "It is wise to teach all responsible household members where and how to shut off the electricity," cautioning that individual circuits should be shut off before the main circuit. Ready.gov further states that "It is vital that all household members learn how to shut off the water at the main house valve" and cautions that the possibility that rusty valves might require replacement.

=== Response ===
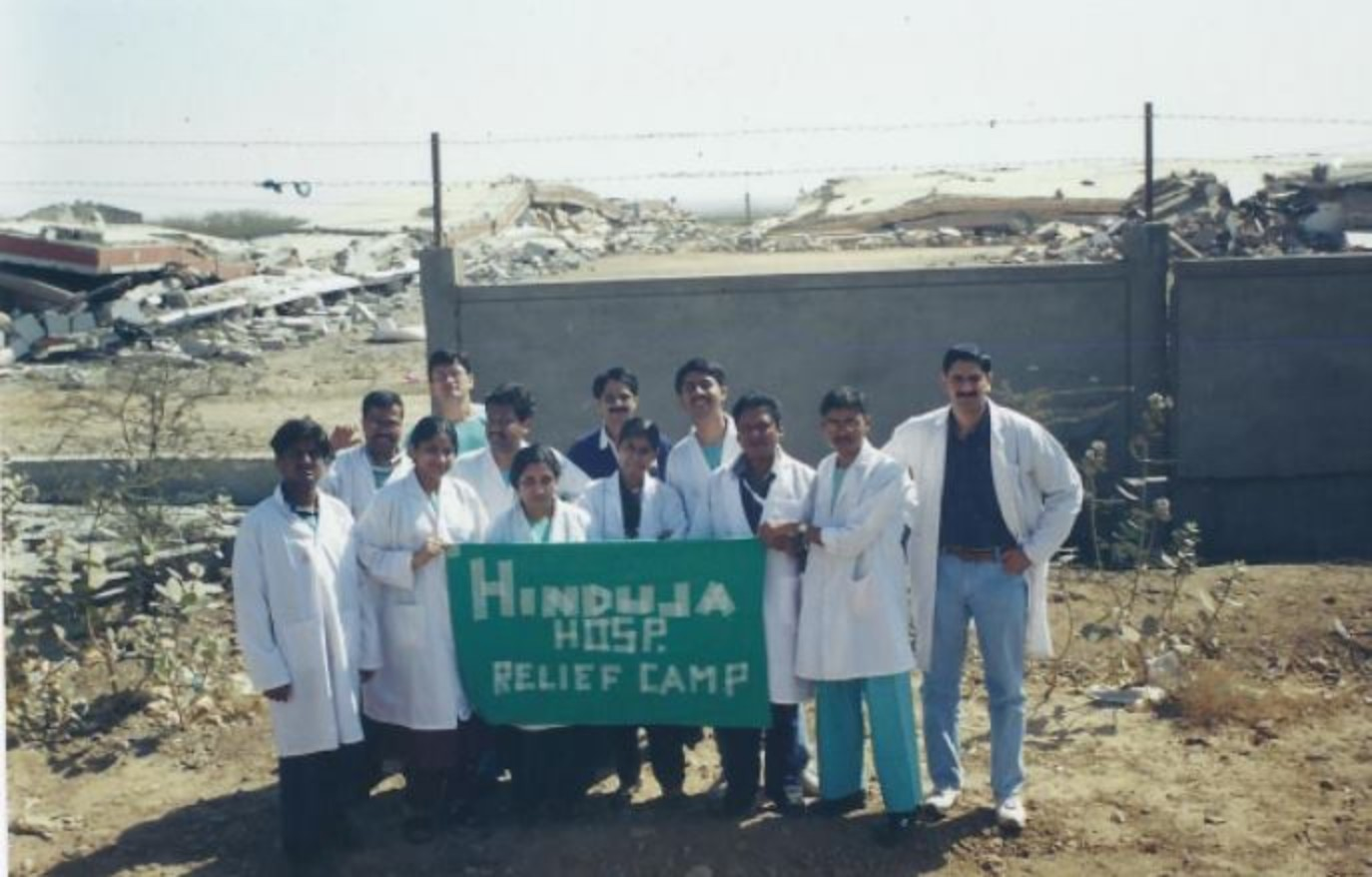
Relief Camp at Bhuj after the 2001 Gujarat Earthquake.

The response phase of an emergency may commence with search and rescue, but in all cases the focus will quickly turn to fulfilling the basic humanitarian needs of the affected population. This assistance may be provided by national or international agencies and organizations. Effective coordination of disaster assistance is often crucial, particularly when many organizations respond and local emergency management agency (LEMA) capacity has been exceeded by the demand or diminished by the disaster itself. The National Response Framework is a United States government publication that explains responsibilities and expectations of government officials at the local, state, federal, and tribal levels. It provides guidance on Emergency Support Functions that may be integrated in whole or parts to aid in the response and recovery process.

The response phase is when preparedness work is adapted to the situation that appeared. While disaster planning is critically important, the plans rarely match the situation exactly, so the plans need to be adapted. For example, although many airlines have disaster plans, most of those plans also assume that a disaster will happen at an airport they frequently use. If they need to deal with airplane crash in the mountains or the ocean, then the plan is adapted.

On a personal level the response can take the shape either of a shelter-in-place or an evacuation.

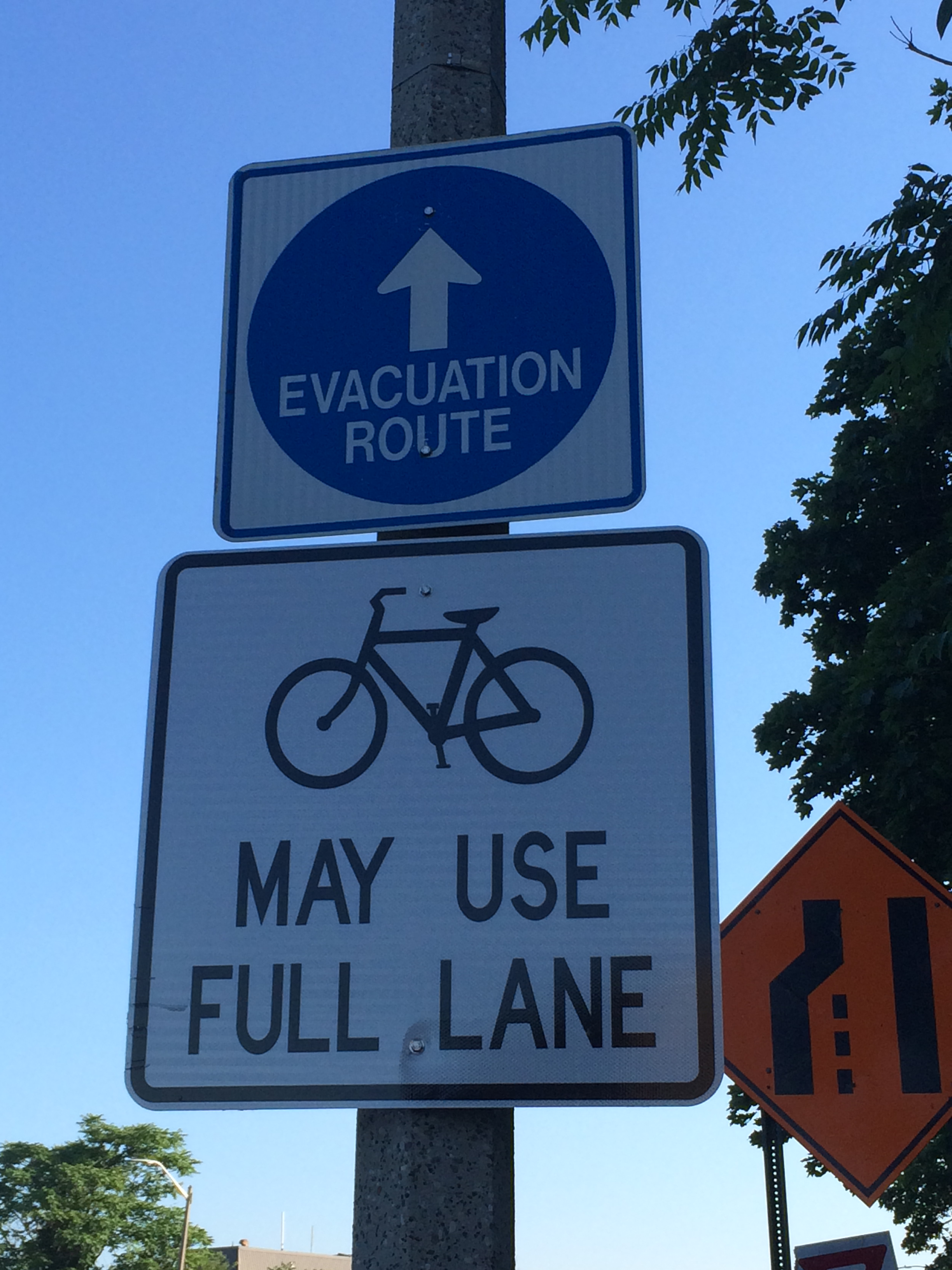
Evacuation sign.

In a shelter-in-place scenario, a family would be prepared to fend for themselves in their home for many days without any form of outside support. In an evacuation, a family leaves the area by automobile or other mode of transportation, taking with them the maximum amount of supplies they can carry, possibly including a tent for shelter. If mechanical transportation is not available, evacuation on foot would ideally include carrying at least three days of supplies and rain-tight bedding, a tarpaulin and a bedroll of blankets.

Organized response includes evacuation measures, search and rescue missions, provision of other emergency services, provision of basic needs, and recovery or ad hoc substitution of critical infrastructure. A range of technologies are used for these purposes.

Donations are often sought during this period, especially for large disasters that overwhelm local capacity. Due to efficiencies of scale, money is often the most cost-effective donation if fraud is avoided. Money is also the most flexible, and if goods are sourced locally then transportation is minimized and the local economy is boosted. Some donors prefer to send gifts in kind, however these items can end up creating issues, rather than helping. One innovation by Occupy Sandy volunteers is to use a donation registry, where families and businesses impacted by the disaster can make specific requests, which remote donors can purchase directly via a web site.

Medical considerations will vary greatly based on the type of disaster and secondary effects. Survivors may sustain a multitude of injuries to include lacerations, burns, near drowning, or crush syndrome.

Amanda Ripley points out that among the general public in fires and large-scale disasters, there is a remarkable lack of panic and sometimes dangerous denial of, lack of reaction to, or rationalization of warning signs that should be obvious. She says that this is often attributed to local or national character, but appears to be universal, and is typically followed by consultations with nearby people when the signals finally get enough attention. Disaster survivors advocate training everyone to recognize warning signs and practice responding.

=== Recovery ===
The recovery phase starts after the immediate threat to human life has subsided. The immediate goal of the recovery phase is to bring the affected area back to normalcy as quickly as possible. During reconstruction, it is recommended to consider the location or construction material of the property.

The most extreme home confinement scenarios include war, famine, and severe epidemics and may last a year or more. Then recovery will take place inside the home. Planners for these events usually buy bulk foods and appropriate storage and preparation equipment, and eat the food as part of normal life. A simple balanced diet can be constructed from vitamin pills, whole-grain wheat, beans, dried milk, corn, and cooking oil. Vegetables, fruits, spices and meats, both prepared and fresh-gardened, are included when possible.

==== Psychological first aid ====
In the immediate aftermath of a disaster, psychological first aid is provided by trained lay people to assist disaster affected populations with coping and recovery. Trained workers offer practical support, assistance with securing basic needs such as food and water, and referrals to needed information and services. Psychological first aid is similar to medical first aid in that providers do not need to be licensed clinicians. It is not psychotherapy, counseling, or debriefing. The goal of psychological first aid is to help people with their long-term recovery by offering social, physical, and emotional support, contributing to a hopeful, calm, and safe environment, and enabling them to help themselves and their communities.

Research states that mental health is often neglected by first responders. Disaster can have lasting psychological impacts on those affected. When individuals are supported in processing their emotional experiences to the disaster this leads to increases in resilience, increases in the capacity to help others through crises, and increases in community engagement. When processing of emotional experiences is done in a collective manner, this leads to greater solidarity following disaster. As such, emotional experiences have an inherent adaptiveness within them, however the opportunity for these to be reflected on and processed is necessary for this growth to occur.

Psychological preparedness is a type of emergency preparedness and specific mental health preparedness resources are offered for mental health professionals by organizations such as the Red Cross. These mental health preparedness resources are designed to support both community members affected by a disaster and the disaster workers serving them. CDC has a website devoted to coping with a disaster or traumatic event. After such an event, the CDC, through the Substance Abuse and Mental Health Services Administration (SAMHSA), suggests that people seek psychological help when they exhibit symptoms such as excessive worry, crying frequently, an increase in irritability, anger, and frequent arguing, wanting to be alone most of the time, feeling anxious or fearful, overwhelmed by sadness, confused, having trouble thinking clearly and concentrating, and difficulty making decisions, increased alcohol and/or substance use, increased physical (aches, pains) complaints such as headaches and trouble with "nerves".

== As a profession ==
Professional emergency managers can focus on government and community preparedness, or private business preparedness. Training is provided by local, state, federal and private organizations and ranges from public information and media relations to high-level incident command and tactical skills.

In the past, the field of emergency management has been populated mostly by people with a military or first responder background. The field has diversified, with many managers coming from a variety of backgrounds. Educational opportunities are increasing for those seeking undergraduate and graduate degrees in emergency management or a related field. There are over 180 schools in the US with emergency management-related programs, but only one doctoral program specifically in emergency management.

Professional certifications such as Certified Emergency Manager (CEM) and Certified Business Continuity Professional (CBCP) are becoming more common as professional standards are raised throughout the field, particularly in the United States. There are also professional organizations for emergency managers, such as the National Emergency Management Association and the International Association of Emergency Managers.

== Memory institutions and cultural property ==
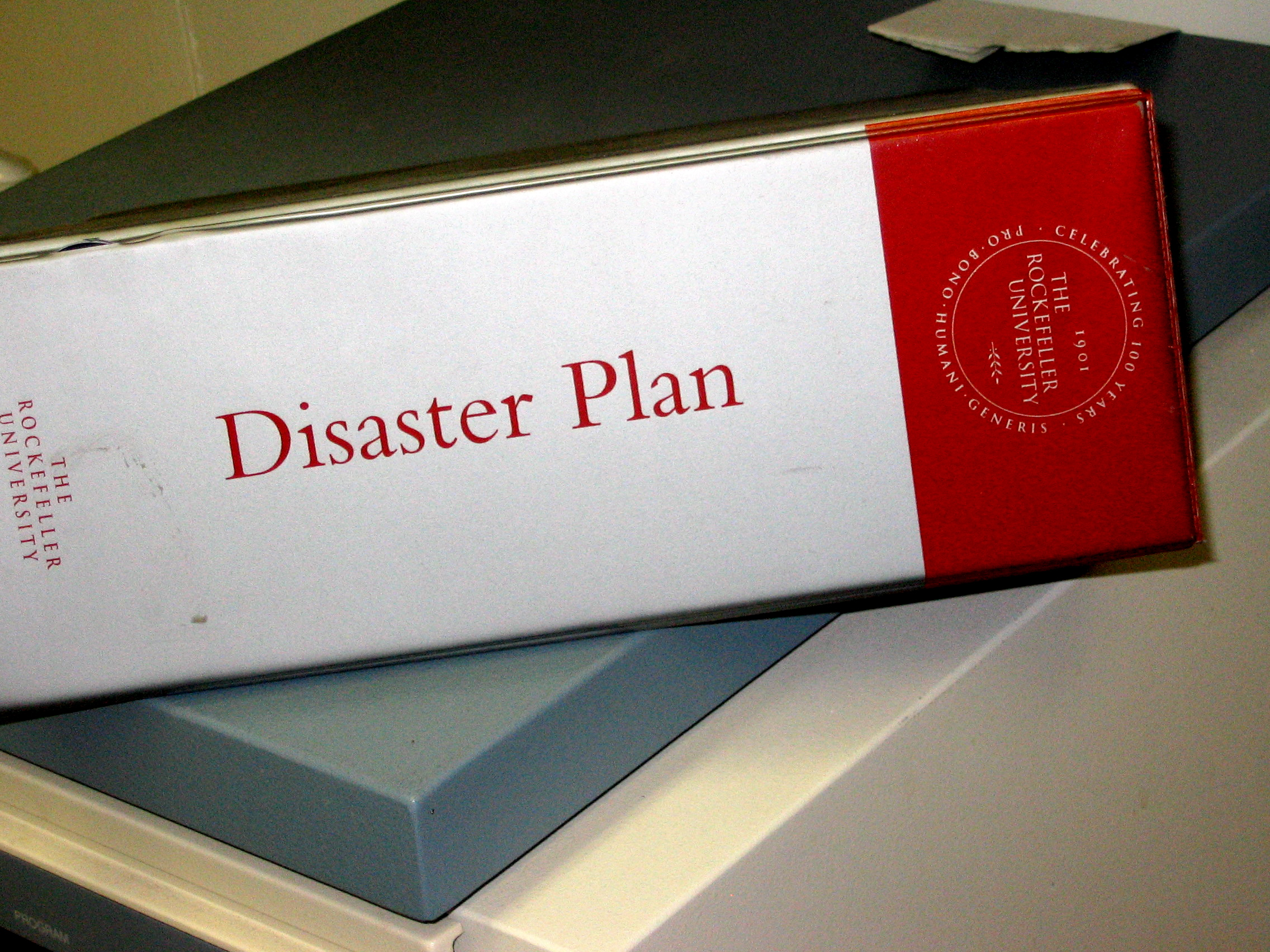
A disaster plan book at Rockefeller University in a biochemistry research laboratory.

Professionals from memory institutions (e.g., museums, historical societies, etc.) are dedicated to preserving cultural heritage—objects and records. This has been an increasingly major component within the emergency management field as a result of the heightened awareness following the September 11 attacks in 2001, the hurricanes in 2005, and the collapse of the Cologne Archives.

== International organizations ==
=== United Nations ===
The United Nations system rests with the Resident Coordinator within the affected country. However, in practice, the UN response will be coordinated by the UN Office for the Coordination of Humanitarian Affairs (UN-OCHA), by deploying a UN Disaster Assessment and Coordination (UNDAC) team, in response to a request by the affected country's government. Finally UN-SPIDER designed as a networking hub to support disaster management by application of satellite technology

=== International Recovery Platform ===
The International Recovery Platform (IRP) is a joint initiative of international organizations, national and local governments, and non-governmental organizations engaged in disaster recovery, and seeking to transform disasters into opportunities for sustainable development.

IRP was established after the Second UN World Conference on Disaster Reduction (WCDR) in Kobe, Japan, in 2005 to support the implementation of the Hyogo Framework for Action (HFA) by addressing the gaps and constraints experienced in the context of post-disaster recovery. After a decade of functioning as an international source of knowledge on good recovery practice, IRP is now focused on a more specialized role, highlighted in the Sendai Framework for Disaster Risk Reduction 2015–2030 as an "international mechanism for sharing experience and lessons associated with build back better".

=== The International Red Cross and Red Crescent Movement ===
The International Federation of Red Cross and Red Crescent Societies (IFRC) works closely with National Red Cross and Red Crescent societies in responding to emergencies, many times playing a pivotal role. In addition, the IFRC may deploy assessment teams, e.g. Field Assessment and Coordination Teams (FACT), to the affected country if requested by the national society. After assessing the needs, Emergency Response Units (ERUs) may be deployed to the affected country or region. They are specialized in the response component of the emergency management framework.

=== World Bank ===
Since 1980, the World Bank has approved more than 500 projects related to disaster management, dealing with both disaster mitigation as well as reconstruction projects, amounting to more than US$40 billion. These projects have taken place all over the world, in countries such as Argentina, Bangladesh, Colombia, Haiti, India, Mexico, Turkey, Vietnam and Syria.

Prevention and mitigation projects include forest fire prevention measures, such as early warning measures and education campaigns; early-warning systems for hurricanes; flood prevention mechanisms (e.g. shore protection, terracing, etc.); and earthquake-prone construction. In a joint venture with Columbia University under the umbrella of the ProVention Consortium Project the World Bank has established a Global Risk Analysis of Natural Disaster Hotspots.

In June 2006, the World Bank, in response to the HFA, established the Global Facility for Disaster Reduction and Recovery (GFDRR), a partnership with other aid donors to reduce disaster losses. GFDRR helps developing countries fund development projects and programs that enhance local capacities for disaster prevention and emergency preparedness.

=== European Union ===
In addition to providing funding to humanitarian aid, the European Commission's Directorate-General for European Civil Protection and Humanitarian Aid Operations (DG-ECHO) is in charge of the EU Civil Protection Mechanism to coordinate the response to disasters in Europe and beyond and contributes to at least 75% of the transport and/or operational costs of deployments. Established in 2001, the Mechanism fosters cooperation among national civil protection authorities across Europe. Currently 34 countries are members of the Mechanism; all 27 EU Member States in addition to Iceland, Norway, Serbia, North Macedonia, Montenegro, Turkey and Bosnia and Herzegovina. The Mechanism was set up to enable coordinated assistance from the participating states to victims of natural and man-made disasters in Europe and elsewhere.

=== International Association of Emergency Managers ===
The International Association of Emergency Managers (IAEM) is a non-profit educational organization aimed at promoting the goals of saving lives and property protection during emergencies. The mission of IAEM is to serve its members by providing information, networking and professional opportunities, and to advance the emergency management profession. It has seven councils around the world: Asia, Canada, Europa, International, Oceania, Student and US.

== National organizations ==
=== Australia ===
Natural disasters are part of life in Australia. Heatwaves have killed more Australians than any other type of natural disaster in the 20th century. Australia's emergency management processes embrace the concept of the prepared community. The principal government agency in achieving this is the National Emergency Management Agency.

=== Canada ===
Public Safety Canada is Canada's national emergency management agency. Public Safety Canada coordinates (PSC) and supports the efforts of federal organizations and oversees emergency management in the few geographic areas under federal jurisdiction (such as federal lands). Under certain conditions, such as under request by a provincial or territorial government, PSC can aid in coordination and management of disasters. Almost all emergency management in Canada is handled at the local, provincial, and territorial level. This is the result of the Canadian constitution which grants provinces exclusive jurisdiction over municipalities for most activities, leaving emergency management the primary responsibility of sub-national government. The Public Safety and Emergency Preparedness Act (SC 2005, c.10) defines the powers, duties, and functions of PSC.

=== China ===
The State Council of the People's Republic of China is responsible for level I and II public emergency incidents except for level II natural disasters which are taken by the Ministry of Emergency Management. Level III and IV non-natural-disasters public emergency incidents are taken by provincial and prefectural government. Level I and IV natural disasters will be managed by National Committee for Disaster Reduction while for level II and III natural disasters it's the Ministry of Emergency Management.

=== Germany ===
In Germany the Federal Government controls the German Katastrophenschutz (disaster relief), the Technisches Hilfswerk (Federal Agency for Technical Relief, THW), and the Zivilschutz (civil protection) programs coordinated by the Federal Office of Civil Protection and Disaster Assistance. Local fire department units, the German Armed Forces (Bundeswehr), the German Federal Police and the 16 state police forces (Länderpolizei) are also deployed during disaster relief operations.

There are several private organizations in Germany that also deal with emergency relief. Among these are the German Red Cross, Johanniter-Unfall-Hilfe (the German equivalent of the St. John Ambulance), the Malteser-Hilfsdienst, and the Arbeiter-Samariter-Bund. The @fire International Disaster Response Germany is a NGO that provides assistance worldwide. As of 2006, there is a program of study at the University of Bonn leading to the degree "Master in Disaster Prevention and Risk Governance" As a support function radio amateurs provide additional emergency communication networks with frequent trainings.

=== India ===
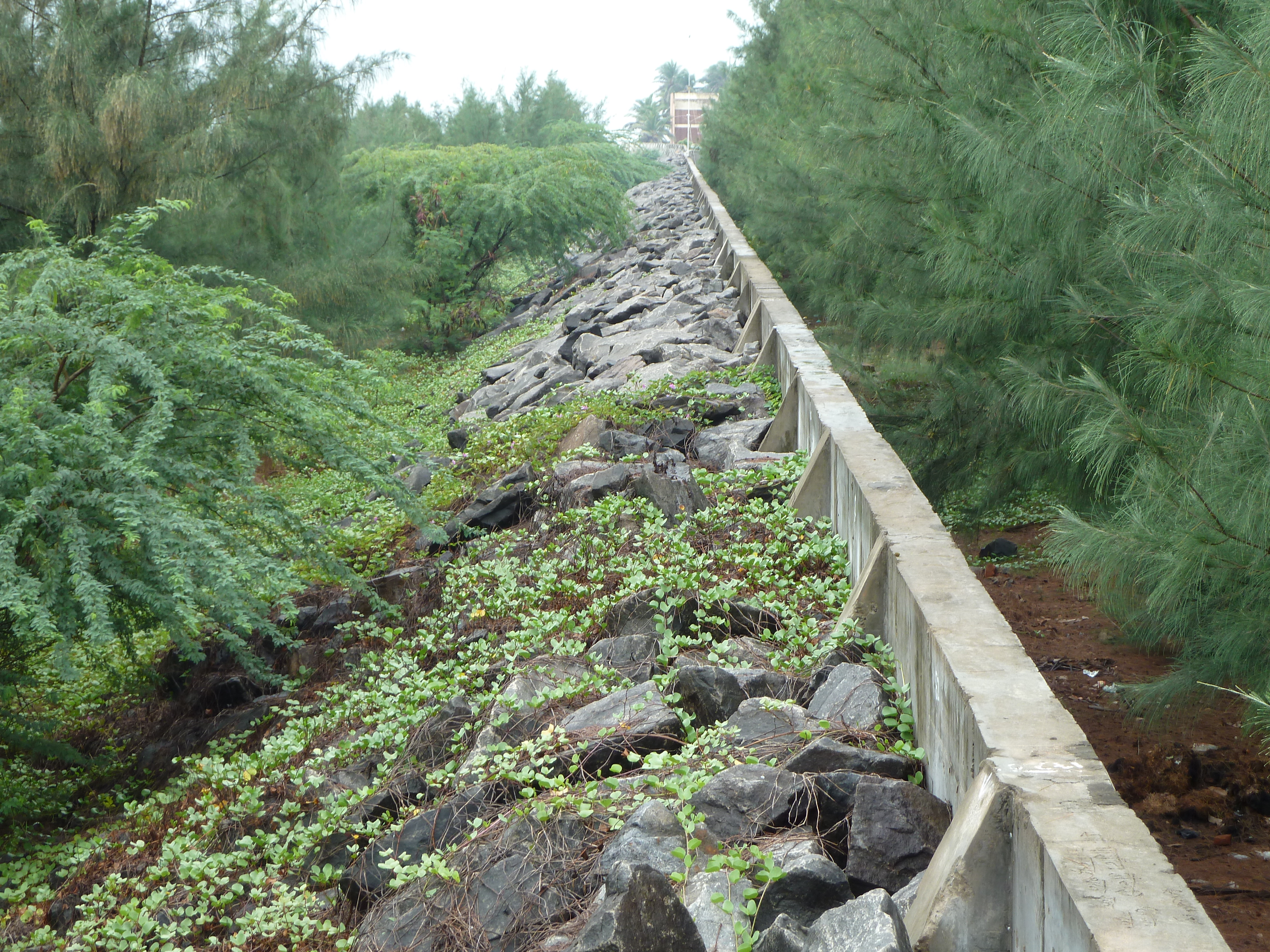
A protective wall built on the shore of the coastal town of Kalpakkam, in aftermath of the 2004 Indian Ocean earthquake.

The National Disaster Management Authority is the primary government agency responsible for planning and capacity-building for disaster relief. Its emphasis is primarily on strategic risk management and mitigation, as well as developing policies and planning. The National Institute of Disaster Management is a policy think-tank and training institution for developing guidelines and training programs for mitigating disasters and managing crisis response.

The National Disaster Response Force is the government agency primarily responsible for emergency management during natural and man-made disasters, with specialized skills in search, rescue and rehabilitation. The Ministry of Science and Technology also contains an agency that brings the expertise of earth scientists and meteorologists to emergency management. The Indian Armed Forces also plays an important role in the rescue/recovery operations after disasters.

Aniruddha's Academy of Disaster Management (AADM) is a non-profit organization in Mumbai, India, with "disaster management" as its principal objective.

=== Japan ===
Emergency management in Japan is led by the Central Disaster Prevention Council. Being a highly centralized system, Japan's Central Disaster Prevention Council has a substantial role in directing the emergency management activities of lower levels of government. There is also a Fire and Disaster Management Agency (FDMA) is the national emergency management agency attached to the Ministry of Internal Affairs and Communications in Japan.

=== Malaysia ===
In Malaysia, National Disaster Management Agency (NADMA Malaysia) is the focal point in managing disaster. It was established under the Prime Minister's Department on October 2, 2015, following the flood in 2014 and took over from the National Security Council. The Ministry of Home Affairs, Ministry of Health and Ministry of Housing, Urban Wellbeing and Local Government are also responsible for managing emergencies. Several agencies involved in emergency management are Royal Malaysian Police, Malaysian Fire and Rescue Department, Malaysian Civil Defence Force, Ministry of Health Malaysia and Malaysian Maritime Enforcement Agency. There were also some voluntary organisations who involved themselves in emergency/disaster management such as St. John Ambulance of Malaysia and the Malaysian Red Crescent Society.

=== Nepal ===
The Nepal Risk Reduction Consortium (NRRC) is based on Hyogo's framework and Nepal's National Strategy for Disaster Risk Management. This arrangement unites humanitarian and development partners with the government of Nepal and had identified five flagship priorities for sustainable disaster risk management.

=== The Netherlands ===
In the Netherlands, the Ministry of Justice and Security is responsible for emergency preparedness and emergency management on a national level and operates a national crisis centre (NCC). The country is divided into 25 safety regions (Dutch: veiligheidsregio's). In a safety region, there are four components: the regional fire department, the regional department for medical care (ambulances and psycho-sociological care etc.), the regional dispatch and a section for risk- and crisis management. The regional dispatch operates for police, fire department and the regional medical care. The dispatch has all these three services combined into one dispatch for the best multi-coordinated response to an incident or an emergency. And also facilitates in information management, emergency communication and care of citizens. These services are the main structure for a response to an emergency. It can happen that, for a specific emergency, the co-operation with another service is needed, for instance the Ministry of Defence, water board(s) or Rijkswaterstaat. The safety region can integrate these other services into their structure by adding them to specific conferences on operational or administrative level.

All regions operate according to the Coordinated Regional Incident Management system.

=== New Zealand ===
In New Zealand, responsibility may be handled at either the local or national level depending on the scope of the emergency/disaster. Within each region, local governments are organized into 16 Civil Defence Emergency Management Groups (CMGs). If local arrangements are overwhelmed, pre-existing mutual-support arrangements are activated. Central government has the authority to coordinate the response through the National Crisis Management Centre (NCMC), operated by the Ministry of Civil Defence & Emergency Management (MCDEM). These structures are defined by regulation, and explained in The Guide to the National Civil Defence Emergency Management Plan 2006, roughly equivalent to the U.S. Federal Emergency Management Agency's National Response Framework.

New Zealand uses unique terminology for emergency management. Emergency management is rarely used, many government publications retaining the use of the term civil defence. For example, the Minister of Civil Defence is responsible for the MCDEM. Civil Defence Emergency Management is a term in its own right, defined by statute. The term "disaster" rarely appears in official publications; "emergency" and "incident" are the preferred terms, with the term event also being used. For example, publications refer to the Canterbury Snow Event 2002.

"4Rs" is the emergency management cycle used in New Zealand, its four phases are known as Reduction, Readiness, Response, Recovery.

=== Pakistan ===
The National Disaster Management Ordinance, 2006 and the National Disaster Management Act, 2010 were enacted after the 2005 Kashmir earthquake and 2010 Pakistan floods respectively to deal with disaster management. The primary central authority mandated to deal with whole spectrum of disasters and their management in the country is the National Disaster Management Authority.

In addition, each province along with Gilgit Baltistan and Azad Kashmir has its own provincial disaster management authority responsible for implementing policies and plans for Disaster Management in the Province.

Each district has its own District Disaster Management Authority for planning, coordinating and implementing body for disaster management and take all measures for the purposes of disaster management in the districts in accordance with the guidelines laid down by the National Authority and the Provincial Authority.

The Federal Flood Commission was established in 1977 under the Ministry of Energy to manage the issues of flood management on country-wide basis.

=== Philippines ===
In the Philippines, the National Disaster Risk Reduction and Management Council is responsible for the protection and welfare of people during disasters or emergencies. It is a working group composed of various government, non-government, civil sector and private sector organizations of the Government of the Republic of the Philippines. Headed by the Secretary of National Defense (under the Office of Civil Defense, the NDRRMCs implementing organization), it coordinates all the executive branches of government, presidents of the leagues of local government units throughout the country, the Armed Forces of the Philippines, Philippine National Police, Bureau of Fire Protection (which is an agency under the Department of the Interior and Local Government), and the public and private medical services in responding to natural and manmade disasters, as well as planning, coordination, and training of these responsible units. Non-governmental organizations such as the Philippine Red Cross also provide manpower and material support for NDRRMC.

=== Russia ===
In Russia, the Ministry of Emergency Situations (EMERCOM) is engaged in fire fighting, civil defense, and search and rescue after both natural and man-made disasters.

=== Somalia ===
In Somalia, the Federal Government announced in May 2013 that the Cabinet approved draft legislation on a new Somali Disaster Management Agency (SDMA), which had originally been proposed by the Ministry of Interior. According to the Prime Minister's Media Office, the SDMA leads and coordinates the government's response to various natural disasters, and is part of a broader effort by the federal authorities to re-establish national institutions. The Federal Parliament is now expected to deliberate on the proposed bill for endorsement after any amendments.

=== Turkey ===
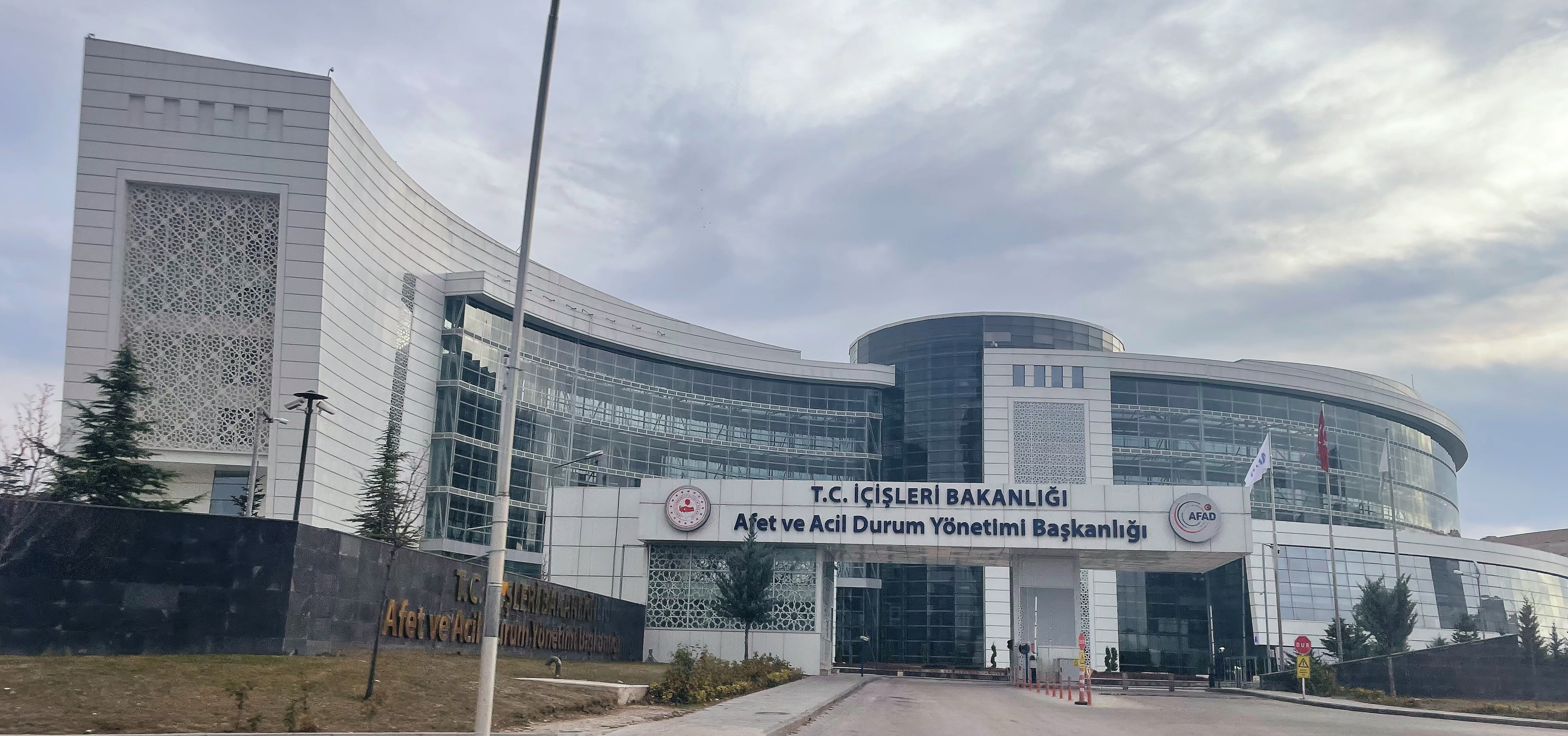
Disaster and Emergency Management Presidency was established in order to manage emergencies in the country.

Disaster and Emergency Management Presidency founded in 2009 in order to combat all types of disaster and emergency cases. The headquarters of the organizations situates in Ankara.

The organization is founded in order to take necessary measures for effective emergency management and civil protection nationwide in Turkey. The presidency conducts pre-incident work, such as preparedness, mitigation and risk management, during-incident work such as response, and post-incident work such as recovery and reconstruction. AFAD reports to the Turkish Ministry of Interior.

In a disaster and emergency, the AFAD is the sole responsible organization.

=== United Kingdom ===
Following the 2000 fuel protests and severe flooding that same year, as well as the foot-and-mouth crisis in 2001, the United Kingdom passed the Civil Contingencies Act 2004 (CCA). The CCA defined some organisations as Category 1 and 2 Responders and set responsibilities regarding emergency preparedness and response. It is managed by the Civil Contingencies Secretariat through Regional Resilience Forums and local authorities.

Disaster management training is generally conducted at the local level, and consolidated through professional courses that can be taken at the UK Resilience Academy. Diplomas, undergraduate and postgraduate qualifications can be gained at universities throughout the country. The Institute of Emergency Management is a charity, established in 1996, providing consulting services for the government, media, and commercial sectors. There are a number of professional societies for Emergency Planners including the Emergency Planning Society and the Institute of Civil Protection and Emergency Management (ICPEM).

One of the largest emergency exercises in the UK was carried out on May 20, 2007, near Belfast, Northern Ireland: a simulated plane crash-landing at Belfast International Airport. Staff from five hospitals and three airports participated in the drill, and almost 150 international observers assessed its effectiveness.

=== United States ===
In the United States, all disasters are initially local, with local authorities, with usually a police, fire, or EMS agency, taking charge. Many local municipalities may also have a separate dedicated office of emergency management (OEM), along with personnel and equipment. If the event becomes overwhelming to the local government, state emergency management (the primary government structure of the United States) becomes the coordinating emergency management agency. Lower levels of government generally maintain a leadership role in the response to and recovery from disasters. The Federal Emergency Management Agency (FEMA), part of the Department of Homeland Security (DHS), is the lead federal agency for emergency management. The United States and its territories are broken down into ten regions for FEMA's emergency management purposes. FEMA supports, but does not override state authority.

The Citizen Corps is an organization of volunteer service programs, administered locally and coordinated nationally by DHS, which seek to mitigate disasters and prepare the population for emergency response through public education, training, and outreach. Most disaster response is carried out by volunteer organizations. In the US, the Red Cross is chartered by Congress to coordinate disaster response services. It is typically the lead agency handling shelter and feeding of evacuees. Religious organizations, with their ability to provide volunteers quickly, are usually integral during the response process. The largest being the Salvation Army, with a primary focus on chaplaincy and rebuilding, and Southern Baptists who focus on food preparation and distribution, as well as cleaning up after floods and fires, chaplaincy, mobile shower units, chainsaw crews and more. With over 65,000 trained volunteers, Southern Baptist Disaster Relief is one of the largest disaster relief organizations in the US. Similar services are also provided by Methodist Relief Services, the Lutherans, and Samaritan's Purse. Unaffiliated volunteers show up at most large disasters. To prevent abuse by criminals, and for the safety of the volunteers, procedures have been implemented within most response agencies to manage and effectively use these spontaneous unaffiliated volunteers.

The US Congress established the Center for Excellence in Disaster Management and Humanitarian Assistance (COE) as the principal agency to promote disaster preparedness in the Asia-Pacific region.

The National Tribal Emergency Management Council (NEMC) is a non-profit educational organization developed for tribal organizations to share information and best practices, as well as to discuss issues regarding public health and safety, emergency management, and homeland security, affecting those under First Nations sovereignty. NTMC is organized into regions, based on the FEMA 10-region system. NTMC was founded by the Northwest Tribal Emergency Management Council (NWTEMC), a consortium of 29 tribal nations and villages in Washington, Idaho, Oregon, and Alaska.

The National Emergency Management Association (NEMA) is a non-partisan, non-profit 501(c)(3) professional association that offers trainings, conferences, tools, and publications in the preparation, mitigation, response, and recovery spaces.

If a disaster or emergency is declared to be terror-related or an "Incident of National Significance", the Secretary of Homeland Security will initiate the National Response Framework (NRF). The NRF allows the integration of federal resources with local, county, state, or tribal entities, with the management of those resources to be handled at the lowest possible level, utilizing the National Incident Management System (NIMS).

The Centers for Disease Control and Prevention offer information for specific types of emergencies, such as disease outbreaks, natural disasters, and severe weather, chemical and radiation accidents, etc. The Emergency Preparedness and Response Program of the National Institute for Occupational Safety and Health develops resources to address responder safety and health during responder and recovery operations.

== See also ==
- Civil defense
- Computer emergency response team
- Disaster medicine
- Disaster response
- Disaster risk reduction
- Emergency communication system
- Emergency management information system
- Emergency sanitation
- Fire fighting
- Local Emergency Planning Committee
- Mass fatality incident
- Protective Action Criteria
- Public health emergency (United States)
- Rohn emergency scale
- Search and rescue

NGOs:

- Catholic Relief Services
- Consortium of British Humanitarian Agencies
- Disaster Accountability Project (DAP)
- GlobalMedic
- International Disaster Emergency Service (IDES)
- Médecins Sans Frontières
- NetHope
