= Provincial Disaster Management Authority (Balochistan) =

Provincial Disaster Management Body of the Government of Balochistan

Provincial Disaster Management Authority Balochistan

Agency overview
- Formed: 2010; 16 years ago
- Jurisdiction: Government of Balochistan
- Headquarters: Quetta, Balochistan, Pakistan
- Agency executives: Naseer Ahmed Nasar, Director General
- Website: www.pdma.gob.pk

The Provincial Disaster Management Authority is an agency of the Government of Balochistan that deals with both natural and manmade disasters in Balochistan province of Pakistan. It was formed after the promulgation of the NDMA Act 2010. The Authority coordinates and collaborates to prevent and minimize damage to life, infrastructure, and environment.

== Provincial Emergency Operation Center (PEOC) ==
Operation Center coordinates between provincial government and district administration in times of emergency.

== District Disaster Management Authority (DDMA) ==
In all the districts of Balochistan, DDMAs are established which consist of district administration officials including police and health department.

== See also ==
- 2011 Balochistan floods
- 2011 Balochistan earthquake
- National Disaster Management Authority (Pakistan)
- Provincial Disaster Management Authority (Khyber Pakhtunkhwa)
- Provincial Disaster Management Authority (Punjab)
- Provincial Disaster Management Authority (Sindh)
- State Disaster Management Authority (Azad Jammu & Kashmir)
- Gilgit-Baltistan Disaster Management Authority
