= 2023 Khyber Pakhtunkhwa rains and storms =

Khyber Pass's Rainstorms

- Date: June 2023
- Venue: Lakki Marwat, Karak and Bannu districts
- Location: Khyber Pakhtunkhwa province, northwestern Pakistan
- Cause: Heavy rains followed by strong winds
- Deaths: At least 27 people, including eight children
- Injuries: More than 140 people
- Property damage: More than 200 livestock died

In June 2023, a devastating storm hit four districts of the Khyber Pakhtunkhwa province in northwestern Pakistan, resulting in the deaths of at least 27 people, including eight children. The storm brought heavy rains and strong winds. The districts affected were Lakki Marwat, Karak and Bannu. Among the victims were five siblings aged between two and eleven.

Taimur Ali Khan, a spokesman for the Provincial Disaster Management Authority, reported that at least 12 people were buried alive when the roofs and walls of their homes collapsed due to the storm. More than 140 people were injured and over 200 livestock also perished. The authorities declared a state of emergency in the four affected districts.

== Response ==
Governor Khyber Pakhtunkhwa Haji Ghulam Ali instructed Red Crescent officials to dispatch relief teams to the affected districts. Relief efforts are underway in several areas, with medical assistance being provided to those injured. All Rescue 1122 stations in Khyber Pakhtunkhwa are on high alert to respond to any further incidents.

== Reactions ==
Prime Minister Shehbaz Sharif expressed his condolences for the loss of life caused by the rains in Khyber Pakhtunkhwa. He directed the National Disaster Management Authority (NDMA) to take steps to provide relief and rehabilitation to those affected. He also ordered coordination with the chief minister of Khyber Pakhtunkhwa.
