= National Institute of Disaster Management =

National Institute of Disaster Management may refer to:

- National Institute of Disaster Management (India)
- National Institute of Disaster Management (Pakistan)

== See also ==
- National Disaster Management Act, 2010
- National Disaster Management Authority (India)
- National Disaster Management Authority (Pakistan)
- National Disaster Management Organization, agency in Ghana
- National Disasters Management Institute, disaster relief agency of Mozambique
