= National Disaster Management Authority =

National Disaster Management Authority may refer to:

- National Disaster Management Authority (India)
- National Disaster Management Authority (Pakistan)
