= Munib =

Munib (also spelled Moneeb, Muneeb, or Münip, Arabic: ﻣﻨﻴﺐ) is an Arabic masculine given name. Notable people with the name include:

== Given name ==
- Muneeb Butt (died 2010), Pakistani murdered child
- Muneeb Diwan (born 1972), Canadian cricketer
- Moneeb Iqbal (born 1986), Scottish cricketer
- Munib Masri (born 1934), Palestinian politician
- Münip Özsoy (1878–1950), Ottoman Army officer
- Munib Ušanović, Bosnian secretary general
- Munib Younan (born 1950), Palestinian Christian theologian
- Munib Hussain, Partner at Milbank LLP

== See also ==
- Muneeba
