= Machai Sar =

Pakistani mountain

Coordinates: 34°35′N 72°54′E

Machai Sar (مچائی سر) is the highest peak of Torghar District, it has an elevation of 9,817 feet (2,992 m).

The district had formerly been known as "Kala Dhaka" or "Black Mountain", following on from the creation of the district of Torghar and a wave of militant activity the government of Pakistan had decided to build a police outpost on the peak. The police post is now one of the ten posts in the district of Toghar and covers an area of 4 kanals.

Machai Sar, which is also known as tourist spot, is prone to cold weather and natural hazards during winter months according to the Provincial Disaster Management Authority.

In January 2022 after snowfall of between 3-4 feet, Machai Sar was isolated as roads connecting it to surrounding areas were closed due to landslides, the Machaisar Road being 20km in length. The peak can be seen from the Agror Valley and other areas - during colonial rule Machai Sar marked the boundary where British rule did not extend.
