= NDMA =

NDMA may refer to:

- N-Nitrosodimethylamine, a semi-volatile organic compound
- National Disaster Management Authority (India)
- National Disaster Management Authority (Pakistan)
