= AADM =

AADM may refer to:

- Aniruddha's Academy of Disaster Management, a non-profit organization focuses on disaster management
- American Academy of Disaster Medicine, organization promoting the science and art of disaster healthcare
