= IRPS =

IRPS may refer to:

- Graduate School of International Relations and Pacific Studies (IR/PS), the original name of the School of Global Policy and Strategy, at the University of California, San Diego
- Image Receiving and Processing Station, part of the ground station for DubaiSat-1
- Indian Railway Personnel Service, a cadre of the Indian Government
- Institute for Religious and Pastoral Studies, the original name of the University of Dallas School of Ministry

== See also ==
- IRP (disambiguation)
- IRPSA, Iran Refined Petroleum Sanctions Act of 2009
