= Provincial Disaster Management Authority (Khyber Pakhtunkhwa) =

Provincial Disaster Management Body of the Government of Khyber Pakhtunkhwa

Agency overview
- Formed: 2010; 16 years ago
- Jurisdiction: Government of Khyber Pakhtunkhwa
- Headquarters: PDMA headquarters Peshawar, Pakistan
- Agency executive: Sharif Hussain, Director General
- Website: www.pdma.gov.pk

Provincial Disaster Management Authority (PDMA) is a provincial government organization, which deals with natural or man-made disasters in Khyber Pakhtunkhwa province of Pakistan. PDMA's mandate is to engage in activities concerning all four stages of Disaster Management Spectrum.

It was established on 14 May 2010 under the National Disaster Management Act, 2010.

In May 2019, the Fata Disaster Management Authority (FDMA) was abolished and its functions were transferred to Provincial Disaster Management Authority (Khyber Pakhtunkhwa), after the Federally Administered Tribal Areas were merged into Khyber Pakhtunkhwa after the passing of the Twenty-fifth and Twenty-sixth Amendments to the Constitution of Pakistan.

== See also ==
- Administrative System of the Federally Administered Tribal Areas
- National Disaster Management Authority (Pakistan)
- Gilgit Baltistan Disaster Management Authority
- State Disaster Management Authority (Azad Jammu & Kashmir)
