= Fujita scale =

Scale for rating tornado intensity

Fujita scale
Scale	Speed		Damage
Scale	mph	km/h	Damage
F0	< 73	< 117	Light
F1	73–112	117–180	Moderate
F2	113–157	181–253	Considerable
F3	158–206	254–332	Severe
F4	207–260	333–418	Devastating
F5	261–318	419–512	Incredible

The Fujita scale (F-Scale; /fuˈdʒiːtə/), or Fujita–Pearson scale (FPP scale), was a scale for rating tornado intensity, based primarily on the damage tornadoes inflict on human-built structures and vegetation. The official Fujita scale category is determined by meteorologists and engineers after a ground or aerial damage survey, or both; and depending on the circumstances, ground-swirl patterns (cycloidal marks), weather radar data, witness testimonies, media reports and damage imagery, as well as photogrammetry or videogrammetry if motion picture recording is available. The Fujita scale, named for the meteorologist Ted Fujita, was replaced with the Enhanced Fujita scale (EF-Scale) in the United States in February 2007. In April 2013, Canada adopted the EF-Scale over the Fujita scale along with 31 "Specific Damage Indicators" used by Environment Canada (EC) in their ratings.

== Background ==
The scale was introduced in 1971 by Ted Fujita of the University of Chicago, in collaboration with Allen Pearson, head of the National Severe Storms Forecast Center/NSSFC (currently the Storm Prediction Center/SPC). The scale was updated in 1973, taking into account path length and width. In the United States, starting in the late 1970s, tornadoes were rated soon after occurrence. The Fujita scale was applied retroactively to tornadoes reported between 1950 and the adoption of the scale in the National Oceanic and Atmospheric Administration (NOAA) National Tornado Database. Fujita rated tornadoes from 1916 to 1992 and Tom Grazulis of The Tornado Project retroactively rated all known significant tornadoes (F2–F5 or causing a fatality) in the U.S. back to 1880. The Fujita scale was adopted in most areas outside of the United Kingdom.

On February 1, 2007, the Fujita scale was decommissioned, and the Enhanced Fujita Scale was introduced in the United States. The new scale more accurately matches wind speeds to the severity of damage caused by the tornado.

Though each damage level is associated with a wind speed, the Fujita scale is effectively a damage scale, and the wind speeds associated with the damage listed are not rigorously verified. The Enhanced Fujita Scale was formulated due to research that suggested that the wind speeds required to inflict damage by intense tornadoes on the Fujita scale are greatly overestimated. A process of expert elicitation with top engineers and meteorologists resulted in the EF scale wind speeds, but these are biased to United States construction practices. The EF scale also improved damage parameter descriptions.

== Derivation ==
A diagram illustrating the relationship between the Beaufort, Fujita, and Mach number scales

The original scale as derived by Fujita was a theoretical 13-level scale (F0–F12) designed to smoothly connect the Beaufort scale and the Mach number scale. F1 corresponds to the twelfth level of the Beaufort scale, and F12 corresponds to Mach number 1.0. F0 was placed at a position specifying no damage (approximately the eighth level of the Beaufort scale), in analogy to how Beaufort's zeroth level specifies little to no wind. From these wind speed numbers, qualitative descriptions of damage were made for each category of the Fujita scale, and then these descriptions were used to classify tornadoes.

=== F6 rating ===
At the time Fujita derived the scale, little information was available on damage caused by wind, so the original scale presented little more than educated guesses at wind speed ranges for specific tiers of damage. Fujita intended that only F0–F5 be used in practice, as this covered all possible levels of damage to frame homes as well as the expected estimated bounds of wind speeds. He did, however, add a description for F6, which he called an "inconceivable tornado", to allow for wind speeds exceeding F5 and possible advancements in damage analysis that might show it.

Based on aerial photographs of the damage it caused, Fujita assigned the strongest tornado of the 1974 Super Outbreak, which affected Xenia, Ohio, a preliminary rating of F6 intensity ± 1 scale. The 1977 Birmingham–Smithfield F5 tornado's damage was surveyed by Ted Fujita and he "toyed with the idea of rating the Smithfield tornado an F6". In 2001, tornado expert Thomas P. Grazulis stated in his book F5–F6 Tornadoes; "In my opinion, if there ever was an F6 tornado caught on video, it was the Pampa, Texas tornado of 1995". In 2023, it was announced by the Storm Prediction Center and National Weather Service Norman, Oklahoma that the 1970 Lubbock tornado was originally rated F6, which was later downgraded to its official rating of F5.

Furthermore, the original wind speed numbers have since been found to be higher than the actual speeds required to incur the damage described at each category. The error manifests itself to an increasing degree as the category increases, especially in the range of F3 through F5. NOAA notes that "precise wind speed numbers are actually guesses and have never been scientifically verified. Different wind speeds may cause similar-looking damage from place to place—even from building to building. Without a thorough engineering analysis of tornado damage in any event, the actual wind speeds needed to cause that damage are unknown."

The Tornado Project, headed by tornado expert Thomas P. Grazulis, states in reference to the F6 rating, "[i]f this level is ever achieved, evidence for it might only be found in some manner of ground swirl pattern, for it may never be identifiable through engineering studies".

== Parameters ==
The six categories are listed here, in order of increasing intensity.

- The rating of any given tornado is of the most severe damage to any well-built frame home or comparable level of damage from engineering analysis of other damage.
- Since the Fujita scale is based on the severity of damage resulting from high winds, a tornado exceeding F5 is an immeasurable theoretical construct. Frame-home structural damage cannot exceed total destruction and debris dispersal, which constitutes F5 damage. Tornadoes with wind speeds over 319 mph (513 km/h) are possible and such extreme gusts have been determined using mobile radar observation, but no tornado has received an official damage-based F6 rating.

Scale	Wind speed estimate		Frequency	Potential damage	
Scale	mph	km/h	Frequency	Potential damage	
F0	40–72	64–116	44.14%	Minor damage. Well-built structures are typically unscathed, though sometimes sustaining broken windows, with minor damage to roofs and chimneys. Billboards and large signs can be knocked down. Trees may have large branches broken off and can be uprooted if they have shallow roots.	F0 damage to a home in Georgia from a tornado on March 13, 1997. There is only minor scuffing to the roof. Alongside the roof damage, several trees appear to have been uprooted, with some large branches scattered around the driveway.
F1	73–112	117–180	34.24%	Moderate damage. Damage to mobile homes and other temporary structures becomes significant, and cars and other vehicles can be pushed off the road or flipped. Permanent structures can suffer major damage to their roofs.	F1 damage to a home from a tornado on May 30, 1998, in South Dakota. The only major point of damage is the roof, with only the skeleton remaining. Some siding of the house has been peeled off, with debris scattered; the house has also been shifted off its foundation slightly.
F2	113–157	181–253	16.17%	Significant damage. Well-built structures can suffer severe damage, including roof loss, and the collapse of some exterior walls may occur in poorly built structures. Mobile homes are heavily damaged or even destroyed. Vehicles can be lifted off the ground, and lighter objects can become small missiles, causing damage outside of the tornado's main path. Wooded areas have a large percentage of their trees snapped or uprooted.	F2 damage to a mobile home on January 3, 2000 in Missisippi. In contrast to a regular well-constructed house - which still suffers severe damage at F2 strength - mobile homes are often destroyed or heavily damaged. This mobile home has had the walls detached.
F3	158–206	254–332	4.35%	Severe damage. A few parts of affected buildings are left standing. Well-built structures lose all outer and some inner walls. Unanchored homes are swept away, and homes with poor anchoring may collapse entirely. Trains and train cars are all overturned. Small vehicles and similarly sized objects are lifted off the ground and tossed as projectiles. Wooded areas suffer an almost total loss of vegetation and some tree debarking may occur.	F3 damage in Hallam, Nebraska from a tornado on May 22, 2004. In the image, only the lowest level of the house remains, alongside a wall. Most of the house has been almost leveled, as indicated by the debris piled on top of the house.
F4	207–260	333–418	1%	Devastating damage. Well-built homes are reduced to a short pile of medium-sized debris on the foundation. Homes with poor or no anchoring are swept completely away. Large, heavy vehicles, including airplanes, trains, and large trucks, can be pushed over, flipped repeatedly, or picked up and thrown. Large, healthy trees are entirely debarked and snapped off close to the ground or uprooted altogether and turned into flying projectiles. Passenger cars and similarly sized objects can be picked up and flung for considerable distances.	F4 damage to a home in Moore, Oklahoma, caused by a tornado that occurred on May 3, 1999. Only the debris of the structure remain. (This portion of damage was rated F4; the final rating of the tornado was an F5.)
F5	261–318	419–512	0.1%	Incredible damage. Well-built and well-anchored homes are taken off their foundations and they go into the air before obliteration. The wreckage of those homes is flung for miles and those foundations are swept completely clean. Large, steel-reinforced structures such as schools are completely leveled. Low-lying grass and vegetation are shredded from the ground. Trees are completely debarked and snapped. Very little recognizable structural debris is generated with most materials reduced to a coarse mix of small, granular particles and dispersed. Large, multiple-ton steel frame vehicles and farm equipment are often mangled beyond recognition and tossed miles away or reduced entirely to unrecognizable parts. Tall buildings collapse or have severe structural deformations.	F5 damage from the Moore, Oklahoma tornado on Monday, May 3, 1999. The entire house has swept away from its foundation, with only the slab of the house remaining; due to the immense power of the tornado, debris has been scattered.

=== Pearson scales ===
In 1973, Allen Pearson added additional path length and path width parameters to the Fujita scale. Under this version, each tornado would be assigned one Fujita scale rating and two Pearson scale ratings. For example, a tornado rated F4 based on damage with a path length of 63 miles (101 km) and a path width of 800 yards (730 m) would be rated F,P,P 4,4,4. Use of the Pearson scales was not widespread, however, and it remained more common to simply list a tornado's path length and path width directly.

Pearson scales
Scale	Path length	Path width
–	<0.3 mi (0.48 km)	<6 yd (5.5 m)
P0	0.3–0.9 mi (0.48–1.45 km)	6–17 yd (5.5–15.5 m)
P1	1.0–3.1 mi (1.6–5.0 km)	18–55 yd (16–50 m)
P2	3.2–9.9 mi (5.1–15.9 km)	56–175 yd (51–160 m)
P3	10–31 mi (16–50 km)	176–566 yd (161–518 m)
P4	32–99 mi (51–159 km)	0.3–0.9 mi (0.48–1.45 km)
P5	100–315 mi (161–507 km)	1.0–3.1 mi (1.6–5.0 km)

== Rating classifications ==
Tornado rating classifications
F0	F1	F2	F3	F4	F5
Weak		Strong		Violent	
		Significant			
			Intense		

For purposes such as tornado climatology studies, Fujita scale ratings may be grouped into classes.

== Decommissioning in the U.S. ==
The Fujita scale, introduced in 1971 as a means to differentiate tornado intensity and path area, assigned wind speeds to damage that were, at best, educated guesses. Fujita and others recognized this immediately and intensive engineering analysis was conducted through the rest of the 1970s. This research, as well as subsequent research, showed that tornado wind speeds required to inflict the described damage were actually much lower than the F-scale indicated, particularly for the upper categories. Also, although the scale gave general descriptions of damage a tornado could cause, it gave little leeway for strength of construction and other factors that might cause a building to sustain more damage at lower wind speeds. Fujita tried to address these problems somewhat in 1992 with the Modified Fujita Scale, but by then he was semi-retired and the National Weather Service was not in a position to update to an entirely new scale, so it went largely unenacted.

In the United States, on February 1, 2007, the Fujita scale was decommissioned in favor of what scientists believe is a more accurate Enhanced Fujita Scale. The meteorologists and engineers who designed the EF Scale believe it improves on the F-scale on many counts. It accounts for different degrees of damage that occur with different types of structures, both manmade and natural. The expanded and refined damage indicators and degrees of damage standardize what was somewhat ambiguous. It also is thought to provide much better estimates of wind speeds and sets no upper limit on the wind speeds for the highest level, EF5. Environment Canada began using the Enhanced Fujita scale in Canada on April 1, 2013.

== See also ==
- Enhanced Fujita scale
- International Fujita scale
- Lists of tornadoes and tornado outbreaks
  - List of F5 and EF5 tornadoes
- Rohn Emergency Scale for measuring the magnitude (intensity) of any emergency
- Saffir–Simpson Hurricane Scale
- Severe weather terminology (United States)
- Tornado intensity and damage
- Tornado records
- TORRO scale
- Wind engineering
