= IRP =

IRP may mean any of the following in:

== Science and technology ==
- NIH Intramural Research Program
- I/O request packet, in Microsoft Windows
- Iron Removal Plant, in water treatment
- Iron-responsive element-binding protein or iron regulatory protein

== Political and international organizations ==
- Initiative of the Republic of Poland, a former Polish political party
- International Recovery Platform, a joint initiative of United Nations agencies, international financial institutions, national and local governments, and non-governmental organizations engaged in disaster recovery
- Institute of Revolutionary Practice, educational institution affiliated with the Kuomintang
- International Registration Plan of transportation carriers in North America
- The International Reporting Project, funds independent journalistic coverage
- International Resource Panel, for sustainable use of natural resources
- International Responsa Project, a Schlesinger Institute project concerning medical issues and Jewish law
- Islamic Renaissance Party of Tajikistan
- Islamic Republic of Pakistan
- Islamic Republic Party, former Iranian political party

== Other ==
- IRP, IATA code for Matari Airport
- Irp., Irpinian dialect
- Indianapolis Raceway Park, a short track in Indianapolis, Indiana
- Individual'nyi Ratsion Pitaniya (IRP) (Индивидуальный рацион питания (ИРП)), Russian military rations
- Integrated resource planning, a method for long-term utility planning
- Integrated Rail Plan for the North and Midlands, UK government plan for its railways
- Integrated Resource Plan, used in South Africa and by United States energy utilities
