= Disaster Accountability Project =

American non-profit watchdog organization

- Founded: 2007
- Founder: Ben Smilowitz
- Purpose: Disaster management
- Method: organization, education, advocacy
- Website: disasteraccountability.org

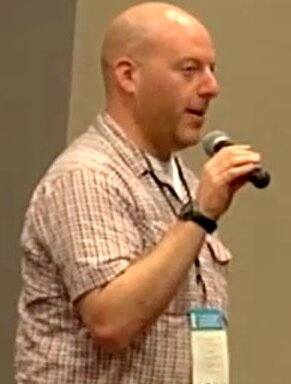
Ben Smilowitz in 2016

The Disaster Accountability Project (DAP) is a non-partisan watchdog organization dedicated to improving disaster management systems. DAP was founded in 2007 by Ben Smilowitz as a reaction to the responses to hurricanes Katrina and Rita. DAP is a 501(c)(3) non-profit organization and is a 2008 Echoing Green fellowship organization.

== Initiatives ==
- Disaster Accountability Project Hotline - a toll free hotline through which survivors of a disaster, relief workers, and whistle-blowers can report gaps in relief services.
- Federal Emergency Management Agency's ice policy - an effort to pressure FEMA to reverse its decision to only deliver ice for "medical emergencies" following a disaster.
- FEMA Structural Reforms - among other reforms, DAP has advocated for the elevation of the FEMA Administrator to a U.S. Cabinet-level position.
- Report on Southern Louisiana Emergency Preparedness - a study conducted in 2009, which evaluated the emergency preparedness plans of 22 Southern Louisiana parishes based upon their comprehensiveness and accessibility to the general public. The study revealed that 11 of the 22 parishes surveyed could not or would not produce copies of their emergency plans when requested.
- ReliefOversight.org - a website created as a response to the 2010 Haiti earthquake. ReliefOversight.org monitors the activities of relief organizations in disaster zones during the aftermath of a natural or man-made disaster.
