= Muneeba =

Muneeba or Muniba is a given name. Notable people and characters with the name include:

== People ==
- Muneeba Ali (born 1997), Pakistani cricketer
- Muneeba Yaseen, actor in 3 Bahadur
- Muniba Mazari (born 1987), Pakistani activist

== Fictional characters ==
- Muneeba Khan, Marvel Comics character

== See also ==
- Muneeb
