= Lynching of Mughees and Muneeb Butt =

In 2010 in Punjab, Pakistan

- Muneeb (left) and Mughees (right)
- Date: August 15, 2010
- Location: Two kilometres away from Haji Pura near the Rescue 1122 office, located on the verge of Buttar village.
- Coordinates: 32°8′50″N 74°40′35″E
- Charges: 7 death sentences

Mughees and Muneeb Butt (Urdu: مغیث اور منیب بٹ) were two Pakistani brothers who were lynched by a mob on August 15, 2010, in Sialkot, Punjab, Pakistan. The brothers were killed, hanged, and mutilated in Sialkot with the support of local police and Rescue 1122.

The lynching was witnessed by a crowd of people including nine police officials who apparently offered no intervention. The people stood there as the two innocent boys were assaulted by a crowd of people. One of the brothers escaped and asked the local rescue services for help, but they denied it and returned the boy back to the crowd where he was eventually beaten to death. The brutal killing of two brothers was recorded by some of the witnesses, which was later broadcast by the media. They were subjected to continuous punches and kicks and were beaten with wooden beams and stones.

The two brothers were accused on the spot of robbery, dacoity, and murder. A judicial inquiry found that the boys had been innocent of the charges and those police officers present at the scene of the crime had failed to stop the attack. According to an investigative report by Director General of Anti-Corruption, Kazim Malik, police officials present at the crime scene encouraged the killing of the brothers.

Shams Ali, one of the accused involved in the killing, claimed that he carried out the murders at the behest of the former District Police Officer of Sialkot, Waqar Chauhan.

== Background ==
Mughees Butt (17) and Muneeb Butt (15) were residents of Haji Pura, Sialkot.

== Trial ==
On September 20, 2011, the Anti-Terrorism Court Gujranwala (ATC) issued its verdict, sentencing seven people to death, six to life in prison, and giving all the policemen involved in the incident three-year terms. The ATC Judge Mushtaq Gondal found 10 policemen, including former DPO Waqar Chohan, guilty. Five of the accused were acquitted by the court. In total 28 people were accused in the case. Seven accused were sentenced to death, and were scheduled to be hanged on April 8, 2016, in Sialkot. However, the Supreme Court transmuted the death penalties to 10 years imprisonment on October 23, 2019.
