= Rescue 1122 =

Emergency service in Pakistan

- 1122 ایمرجنسی
- Type: Emergency service
- Region served: Pakistan
- Key people: Dr. Rizwan Naseer; Dr. Farhan Khalid
- Website: Official Websites

Rescue 1122 (Urdu: 1122 ایمرجنسی) is an emergency service that serves almost all regions of Pakistan including Punjab, Khyber Pakhtunkhwa, Balochistan, Sindh, Gilgit-Baltistan and Azad Kashmir. The service is accessible by dialing 1122 from any phone within Pakistan.

== History ==
Prior to 2004, Pakistan did not have an organised emergency medical system. In that year, Rescue 1122 was launched as a professional pre-hospital emergency service within Lahore, and it managed to achieve an average response time of seven minutes, comparable to that of developed nations. Some critical factors in its success included local manufacturing of vehicles, training instructors to certify emergency medical technicians, adopting training materials to the local context and branching out to include fire and rescue service response under a united command structure.

== Regions ==
=== Rescue 1122 - Punjab ===
After the success of the Lahore Pilot Project launched in 2004, Rescue 1122 (Punjab) was established by the Government of Chaudhry Pervaiz Elahi in Punjab. Rescue 1122 (Punjab) is operational in all districts of Punjab with the province having a population of over 110 million and providing technical assistance to other provinces of Pakistan. Rescue 1122 includes emergency ambulance, rescue & fire services and a community safety programme.

Initially it was established under the 2006 Punjab Emergency Service Act to provide management of emergencies such as fire, rescue and emergency medical services. The Punjab Emergency Council and District Emergency Boards have been constituted to ensure management and prevention of emergencies and to recommend measures for mitigation of hazards endangering public safety.

=== Rescue 1122 - Sindh ===
Sindh Emergency Rescue Service (SERS) was launched in May 2022 followed by the provincial assembly of the Government of Sindh approving the "Sindh Emergency Rescue Service Act, 2023" in August 2023. It now operates in all divisions of Sindh.

=== Rescue 1122 - KP ===
Formed under the "Khyber Pakhtunkhwa Emergency Rescue Service Act, 2012". Provides emergency services in the entire KP province.

=== Rescue 1122 - Balochistan ===
MERC-1122 provides emergency services alongside major highways in Balochistan while PDMA Balochistan provides emergency services within Quetta city, the provincial capital.

=== Rescue 1122 - Gilgit Baltistan ===
Gilgit Baltistan Emergency Service (Rescue 1122) was established under the "Gilgit Baltistan Emergency Service Act, 2012" for professional management of emergencies such as road traffic accidents, building collapse, fires, hazardous material incidents and disasters in the GB region.

=== Rescue 1122 - Azad Kashmir ===
In 2007, the SDMA in AJK launched a pilot project, partnering with Punjab Emergency Services, to establish Rescue 1122 services in four districts. Since then, the coverage of these services has expanded throughout AJK.

=== Rescue 1122 - Islamabad ===
CARES 1122, the Capital Ambulance, Rescue and Emergency Services, offers emergency management services within Islamabad. The service is operated by the CDA and MCI.

== Operations ==
The District Emergency Officer is responsible for the day-to-day operational management and administration of the Service in the Districts in close coordination with the District Administration. The office of the Director General is mainly responsible for the overall monitoring to ensure uniformity and quality, training, planning, research and development through the Provincial Monitoring Cell.

== Emergency Services Academy ==
The Emergency Services Academy, the first training institute of its kind in Pakistan, was established as a centre for imparting emergency medical training, fire fighting, collapse structure search & rescue, high angle & confined space rescue, water rescue and other emergency management skills. The Academy was established in vacant Government premises. It consists of a Training Manikins lab, Rescue Simulation Building, Hazmat Incident Training, Urban Search and Rescue Simulator.

Emergency management training uses incident scenarios which have been simulated for hands on training for the personnel of Emergency Services. These scenarios replicate fires, building collapse, hazardous material incidents and emergencies involving mass casualties. Training material developed by Punjab Emergency Service (Rescue 1122) supports the practical training.

The Academy is in the process of obtaining international accreditation. Bilateral collaboration between PES and emergency services of the United Kingdom have trained emergency officers in the UK. Moreover, Rescue 1122 is now also training Pakistan Army's Medical Corp.

Official Websites
Region	Website
Punjab	
Sindh	
KP	
Balochistan	
Gilgit Baltistan	
Azad Kashmir	
