= Aniruddha's Academy of Disaster Management =

Indian non-profit organization

Aniruddha's Academy of Disaster Management (AADM) is a non-profit organization incorporated in Mumbai, India with 'disaster management' as its principal objective. The basic aim of AADM is to save life and property in the event of a disaster, be it natural or manmade. Towards this end, AADM imparts disaster management training. The main objective of AADM is to build up a volunteer base across the globe, that will be able to handle various disasters and disaster situations effectively. AADM has a trained Disaster Management Volunteer (DMV) force of about 60,000.

== History ==
AADM was founded in April 2005, under section 25 of the Companies Act, 1956. The academy was formed under the guidance of Dr. Aniruddha D. Joshi (M.D. Medicine, Rheumatologist, who is fondly referred as Aniruddha Bapu).

== Textbook of Disaster Management ==
Coverpage of Textbook of Disaster Management

The Textbook of Disaster Management was compiled by AADM in the year 2002. It has proved to be of great help in training the trainer on how to impart effective disaster management training to an average citizen of India. It also serves as a virtual handbook in the event of a disaster.

== Volunteers ==
There are two types of volunteers:

(i) 'DMV' (Disaster Management Volunteer) The members trained in the 7-day basic disaster management course offered by AADM are termed as 'DMV's.

(ii)'Transmitter' (Trainers for DMVs). Those come forward to teach fellow citizens in basic disaster management are termed as 'Transmitters'. Currently AADM has a total of 60,000 DMVs and 450 Transmitters.

== Basic Disaster Management Course ==
The Basic Disaster Management Training Course includes training the common citizen in the finer aspects of first-aid, with the objective of saving lives until Qualified Medical Assistance arrives. Apart from the first-aid techniques, the training course also covers information on all possible kinds of disasters and ways to effectively respond to them. This includes natural disasters such as earthquakes, floods, cyclones, famines, drought, etc. and man made disasters such as explosions (bomb blasts), religious violence (communal riots), etc., as also nuclear, biological and chemical warfare, which have come to pose a genuine and serious threat to the very survival of mankind and civilization.

== Functions ==
- Establishing or rendering help to any institution engaged in the alleviation of human suffering.
- To provide assistance to the local civic authorities during festivals, public functions or any other public event, primarily for the purposes of crowd control.
- To start, maintain and assist in any relief measures, at locations which have been subjected to natural and man-made calamities.
- To initiate and undertake projects towards the rehabilitation of people located in disaster affected areas.
- To mobilize volunteers from among the younger generation by undertaking disaster management courses in schools and colleges.
- To run various parallel projects such as Vermiculture Project, Pulse Polio Vaccination, Blood donation camps etc.

== Activities ==
Assistance to local civic authorities during 26 July 2005 Heavy rainfall disaster:

On July 26, 2005, when heavy rains created a disaster like situation in Mumbai and Maharashtra, AADM's DMVs offered help to the local civic authorities in the rescue operations by making rafts out of used plastic bottles and ferrying the affected to safety. On the same day when a landslide struck Saki Naka, a suburb of Mumbai, the DMVs played a crucial role in saving lives and extricating bodies from the rubble in extremely challenging conditions.

Assistance to local civic authorities during incidents of fire: AADM DMVs actively assist Mumbai's fire brigade and Mumbai police authorities during incidents of fire. For instance, they successfully assisted the authorities when fire broke out at the office of Fairdeal Corporation Ltd., at Jogeshwari, Mumbai, Maharashtra on 26 January 2006 Fire at Hansa Ind. Estate, Mumbai on 6 July 2006

Assistance to local civic authorities during man made disasters: When serial blasts occurred in the compartments of the suburban trains of Western Railway on 11 July 2006, as also the bomb blast at the Agarwal Hospital, Mulund (W), Mumbai on March 15, 2003, at Bomb Blasts at German Bakery, Pune on February 15, 2010

Crowd control activities during fairs and festivals at religious places: AADM DMVs help in controlling and regulating the crowds queuing up for darshan, or where large crowd movement takes place following are such examples, Siddhivinayak Temple, Mumbai, Mahalakshmi Temple, Mumbai Mount Mary Church, Bandra, Mumbai, Mandher Devi Temple in Mandhradevi, Satara, Maharasshtra Paithan, Aurangabad, Maharashtra Immersion of Lord Ganesh Idols during Ganesh Utsav in different parts of Maharashtra

A disaster management training workshop was conducted for the Nandurbar police force on the invitation of the Superintendent of Police – Nandurbar, Maharashtra.

== Vermiculture Project ==
AADM considers soil fertility and environmental protection as the two key aspects of disaster management (prevention section). AADM achieves these by adopting to vermiculture which is an eco-friendly waste management technology.

It is the technology of rearing or cultivating earthworms and using them as natural bio reactors in waste management. It is a simple procedure of maintaining and culturing earthworms that feed on the biodegradable waste, defaces and multiply on wastes.

It can handle all types of bio-degradable waste like food waste, floral and vegetable waste, garden waste, cow dung and paper waste. The non vegetarian food items can also be used. However they take longer time to decompose which could produce poor smell. The dry waste like glass, thermocol, plastic, rubber or likewise which does not decompose cannot be used in the process.

It also helps to protect the earthworm species which plays an important role in soil fertility and environment protection.

It can be practiced in cities and villages or farms. In cities, the citizens should show active participation to overcome the alarming state of the environment. It can be carried out near cow sheds, backyards, basements or any suitable place which can be well protected. Unlike cities, villages have a wider scope for adopting Vermiculture with all the necessary resources easily available and in abundance.

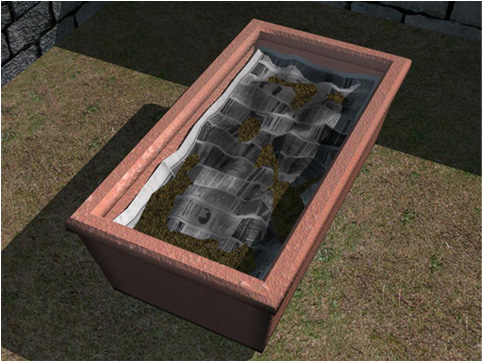
Large pit option for Vermiculture

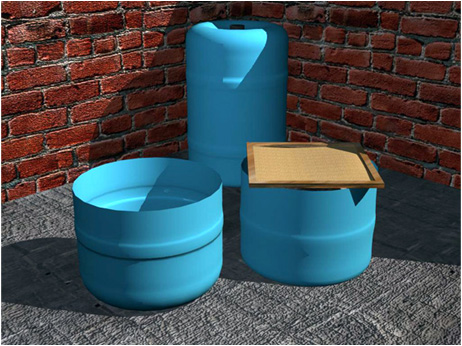
Large pit option for Vermiculture

Consultancy projects:

AADM also offers consultancy to various housing societies, corporate, schools and colleges. Under consultancy, a team of volunteers from the Academy visit the site for survey, and submit a survey report thereafter to cater the requirements for the project execution. The people handling the projects are trained by the Academy's team by personal visits till the first crop of Vermicompost is harvested Thereafter it is the sole responsibility of the society or institution to continue the project in the long run.

Consultancy for vermiculture was provided to the various Educational Institutes, Govt. organizations like:

- Naval Dockyard – Colaba
- Central Railway Matunga workshop
- Pearl Society – Vile Parle
- NABARD

Project awareness:

Upon request from schools and colleges, introduction and demonstrations have been given to students. The demonstrations have been conducted through power point presentations, display charts and practicals. The students are encouraged to maintain a small scale vermiculture bin which can be rated by the teachers as a part of the school project.

Key awareness projects

Awareness through lecture and demonstrations in 24 wards of MCGM-Education Dept. for school children, parents, staff teachers, gardeners and CDO (Community Development Officers) covering around 200 schools. for such programs were conducted half-yearly during Feb.'05 to Dec.'06.

Future for vermiculture in India

Till date 87 tons of Vermicompost has been produced from the academy's own projects in Mumbai and Maharashtra region and has been utilized for tree plantation. That amounts to approx. 340 tons of waste conversion into Vermicompost.

Vermiculture is an eco-friendly waste management technology. It is definitely cost effective and can be implemented in urban and rural areas. It is easy to practice and helps us curb air, water and land pollutions. 'Trees' are considered as living immovable souls. By supplying them with good fertilizers and water, we are not only nurturing them but also trying to repay the obligation of our Mother Earth in a small and righteous way.

== Participation ==
In 2007, AADM was invited by the Municipal Corporation of Greater Mumbai to participate in the 'Monsoon Disaster Plan (2007)' launched by it.

Participation in Disaster Risk Management Master Plan Project :

AADM has contributed to this project initiated by the Municipal Corporation of Greater Mumbai, by gathering and compiling information for the Emergency Operation Plan, and preparing the process document for Emergency Support Function which form part of the Disaster Risk Management Master Plan Project.

Participation in Tatpar Mumbai Project:

AADM participated in the Tatpar Mumbai Project, organized by the Municipal Corporation of Greater Mumbai and the Mumbai Police, Fire department, National Disaster Unit and non-governmental organizations.

Participation in Asia Megacities Forum 2009 event

This forum was organized between the 22 and 24 April 2009, by the Municipal Corporation of Greater Mumbai in collaboration with the Indian Institute of Technology Bombay, who are also partners of the Earthquakes and Megacities initiative.

MoU with Maharashtra Directorate of Vocational Education and Training (2026):

In February 2026, Aniruddha's Academy of Disaster Management entered into a Memorandum of Understanding (MoU) with the Directorate of Vocational Education and Training (DVET), under the Maharashtra Government's Skill Development Department. The agreement was facilitated by Mangal Prabhat Lodha, the Cabinet Minister for Skill Development, Employment, Entrepreneurship and Innovation, Government of Maharashtra. Under the MoU, free and practical disaster management training is to be extended in a phased manner to approximately two lakh (200,000) students enrolled across 419 government Industrial Training Institutes (ITIs) in Maharashtra. The programme is designed to equip ITI students with foundational knowledge of civil defense, disaster preparedness, and emergency response, with the goal of building a trained volunteer force capable of supporting district disaster management authorities during natural or man-made disasters. The training content was developed by the Academy based on a study of various urban and rural disaster scenarios across Maharashtra.
