= Earthquake valve =

Automated gas supply shutoff method

An earthquake valve (or seismic valve) is an automatic method to shut off the low pressure regulated gas supply to a structure during a major earthquake and/or if a pipe is broken. These are applicable both to utility-supplied natural gas and to gas from liquefied petroleum gas (LPG). These small devices are installed on the property gas meter (usually between the utility company's metered installation and the structure piping) and are designed to instantly stop the natural gas supply in order to protect the structure if a gas leak or line break occurs during an earthquake.

Fires or explosions due to gas line breaks can be more damaging than the actual earthquake itself. Gas supply companies recommend that the gas supply be cut off immediately if there is a smell of gas after an earthquake; if nobody is in place to do this, an unattended earthquake valve will instantly cut off the gas.

== Types of valve ==
Two types of valve are commonly employed: one is sensitive to motion and the other to excessive gas flow. One of each type can be connected sequentially for maximum reliability.

=== Motion sensing caged ball ===
A metal ball is retained away from an orifice by sitting upon a ring. Any shaking of the mechanism will cause the ball to roll off its ledge and fall down to block the orifice. It is reset using either an external magnetic device or an internal lift mechanism. If it is too sensitive, it may be triggered by normal vibrations such as passing vehicles. After a severe seismic event, gas piping may be damaged, requiring complete re-inspection for breaks or leaks. Seismic valves are available with pressure classes (7 psig and 60 psig max). An upstream pressure regulator can reduce the gas pressure below 60 psig before the seismic shut-off valves.

=== Excessive flow sensor ===
A valve is closed when the flow exceeds a certain limit that is appropriate to the application. This will only operate when a pipe is broken and there is significant leakage. It may not operate in case of a small, though still dangerous, leak.

== See also ==
- Compressed natural gas
- Pressure regulator
- Safety valve
