= National Disaster Management Act, 2010 =

National Disaster Management Act, 2010 was passed by Parliament of Pakistan in 2010, it received the assent of the president on 8 December 2010. The Act applies to the whole Pakistan. The Act was passed in the backdrop of the 2010 floods in Pakistan and strengthen disaster management system.

== National Disaster Management Commission ==
The Act created a National Disaster Management Commission which was to be responsible for laying down the policies, plans and guidelines for disaster management.

== National Disaster Management Authority ==
The federal authority mandated to deal with whole spectrum of disasters and their management in the country.

== Provincial Disaster Management Commission ==
The article 13 of the Act, Provincial Disaster Management Commissions in all provinces were established. The Provincial Commissions have the responsibility of laying down policies and plans for disaster management in the province.

== Provincial Disaster Management Authority ==
Provincial Authorities are responsible for implementing policies and plans for Disaster Management in the Province. Provincial Authorities were created under article 15 Each province has its own Disaster management authority:

- Provincial Disaster Management Authority (Balochistan)
- Provincial Disaster Management Authority (Khyber Pakhtunkhwa)
- Provincial Disaster Management Authority (Punjab)
- Provincial Disaster Management Authority (Sindh)
- State Disaster Management Authority (Azad Jammu & Kashmir)
- Gilgit Baltistan Disaster Management Authority

== District Disaster Management Authority ==
Under the act each District Disaster Management Authority are established in each of the districts. District Authority shall be as the district planning, coordinating and implementing body for disaster management and take all measures for the purposes of disaster management in the districts in accordance with the guidelines laid down by the National Authority and the Provincial Authority.

== See also ==
- National Disaster Management Authority
- State Disaster Management Authority
- 2010 Pakistan floods
- 2005 Kashmir earthquake
- National Institute of Disaster Management
