= International Disaster Emergency Service =

International Disaster Emergency Service (IDES) is a 501c3 non-profit organization based in Noblesville, Indiana, United States that seeks to meet the physical and spiritual needs of suffering people around the world in the name of Jesus Christ. The organization is primarily funded by Christian Churches and Churches of Christ. Much of its relief effort is done through local churches and missionaries already in place in the countries needing assistance.

IDES has offered assistance in over 131 countries around the world.

== History of IDES ==
Following a major typhoon that hit the already devastatingly poor country of Bangladesh, Milton Bates, a Navy Veteran, and General Motors technician, and his wife, Janet, were deeply moved by the utter destruction they saw on the news reports. Burdened to help somehow, Milton and Janet prayed for God to reveal a way to unite the brotherhood of independent Christian Churches/Churches of Christ in a significant relief effort. After writing and sending over 500 letters from their own kitchen table to various Christian leaders, 9 men wrote back that they would support Milton if he volunteered to lead the effort. Faithfully, Milton and Janet continued to pray for direction, and for the missionaries, they were connected with around the world. Then, at the North American Christian Convention a few months later (1973), Milton and these 9 leaders met together for the first time, and International Disaster Emergency Service was created. Milton is survived by his wife, Janet, his 3 daughters Nancy, Janet-Elaine, and Louise, and his son Jim.

Milton Bates died in 2007, leaving his son-in-law, Rick Jett, as the executive director of IDES.

Now, IDES has expanded to 9 full-time staff members working out of their headquarters in Noblesville, Indiana.

== Services ==
IDES serves in Five Focus Areas:

- Development & Sustainability: IDES’ goal is to give victims a “hand up”, not a “hand out”. This is done by empowering communities to become self-sufficient by providing sustainable sources of food and/or income.
- Disaster Response: IDES provides for both the immediate and long-term needs of victims of both natural and man-made disasters.
- Evangelism: IDES funding is channeled through a worldwide network of mission partners to help those in need and offer the saving message of Jesus Christ.
- Hunger Relief: IDES is dedicated to helping those suffering the effects of hunger and malnutrition through long-term feeding programs and relief projects.
- Medical Care: IDES supplies missionaries and their families with medicines, medical supplies, and emergency medical treatment if they are lacking financial resources or access. IDES also provides the necessary resources for temporary health clinics sponsored by a missionary or mission organization.

== Volunteer Programs ==
- Disaster Assistance Response Teams: IDES has developed a program to utilize regional Disaster Assistance Response Teams (DART) for this very purpose. Participating congregations can either organize a team of volunteers to respond after a disaster, participate in a training course to establish a Preparedness Plan, or contribute funds to IDES designated to support the DART program. IDES will coordinate the training and efforts of these emergency response teams in disaster areas in the U.S. This will extend the ministry beyond financial assistance and expand its exposure to the Christian Churches/Churches of Christ. During times of disaster, DART teams can work together to: Perform clean-up and temporary repairs such as putting tarps on roofs and covering broken windows and doors, Distributing emergency supplies, and constructing or repairing destroyed or damaged structures. During times of non-disaster, DART teams can work together to: Implement and evaluate preparedness plans, Participate in community service, and Establish emergency network relationships.
- GAP Food-Packing: IDES developed the God Always ProvIDES Food-Packing Program (GAP) for hunger and malnourishment relief. The program provides an opportunity to serve together with your church, youth group, co-workers, school group, or family. Anyone from the ages 8 years to 108 years can participate in the assembly-line style process. Meal-packaging events are a great way to participate hands-on in Christian missions and relief work from within your very own community—whether at a conference, in your hometown, or here at the IDES headquarters, you can be involved. The events are organized as a fun way to unite your group around the cause of helping the hungry and hurting around the world, while also creating an opportunity for the Gospel of Jesus Christ to be shared. Each sealable IDES bag contains six 1-cup per serving meals which include four ingredients: Soy = nourishing protein, Dehydrated Vegetables = vital nutrients, 21 est. vitamins & minerals = engineered for reversing malnourishment, Rice = common grain to make each meal a filling one. All GAP meals are shipped to specific Christian Church/Church of Christ missionaries throughout the world who partner with IDES. These missionaries are provided with the necessary amount of food they need in order to feed their hungry people groups and church families for an extended period of time—opening a door to build lasting relationships and share the Gospel of Jesus Christ.
- Harvest of Talents: In the Fall of 1983, Pat Snyder, a member of Lincoln Christian Church in Illinois, felt conviction in her heart after hearing the preacher's comments on the extreme hunger needs throughout the world. Pat decided that she was going to do whatever she could to help those who were hungry. So, she challenged her own family and her church family to consider how God had specifically gifted them, and how those gifts and talents may be marketed for the purpose of raising funds to feed the hungry worldwide. Now 32 years later, the Harvest of Talents for World Hunger has expanded to several different churches that regularly host events around the country each Autumn. Cumulatively, the Harvest events have raised a total of just under $3 million—100% of which has been given through IDES directly supporting feeding programs throughout the world in India, Myanmar, Philippines, Kenya, Tanzania, Sudan, Zimbabwe, El Salvador, Brazil, Haiti, Syria, Dominican Republic, Togo, Honduras, Mozambique, Ghana, Thailand, Romania, Egypt, Israel, and Russia. Any church in any town can host its own Harvest event. Or, you can personally donate items and services directly to IDES or to another church's event. IDES is now also hosting "Harvest Days" at the Noblesville, IN headquarters as an opportunity for you and your group to participate in creating items for the annual Harvest events together, oftentimes using re-purposed pallets and scrap wood from the warehouse. Some examples of items and services that you might find at a Harvest are: Painting and Artwork, Woodwork, Music or Songwriting, Refurbished Antiques, Cooking or Baking, Sculpting or Pottery, Jewelry Making, Quilting or Sewing, Gardening, Misc. goods & Services, DIY Arts & Crafts, and Photography.
- Shed-Building: A group of 2 to as many as 30 volunteers can make an incredible impact on the work it takes to build the sheds. The tasks involved include cutting materials using a miter saw and track saw, assembling components like doors and trusses using pneumatic staplers and nails, and building wall and floor panels. Volunteers do not have to be expert craftsmen in order to participate. Even the most inexperienced volunteer, with a little bit of training, can easily perform these tasks. Some jobs do require heavy lifting, but most involve lifting only smaller loads. The tasks can be tailored to any skill level or physical ability. Once the components for 10 complete sheds have been assembled, they are shipped to local church partners within a disaster zone anywhere in the US to be assembled on the property of families and individuals whose homes have been damaged. Every shed includes words of encouragement and verses of Scripture hand-written by IDES volunteers on the lumber. The purpose of the sheds is to store whatever belongings can be saved or salvaged after an initial disaster has struck and to be used as tools for the local church to reach out into its own community during a time of need in the name of Jesus Christ. Since the program's conception, sheds have been shipped to: South Carolina, Kentucky, California, Illinois, Missouri, Nebraska, Arkansas, South Dakota, Mississippi, Texas, Tennessee, and Colorado.
- SonFish Banks: In 1983, the world was only beginning to witness the devastating effects of hunger, particularly on the African continent. Among those who were moved to do something to help were two faithful followers of Jesus and long-term advocates for poor refugees, Jim and Virginia Willoughby. The couple owned and managed a plastic products factory in Cincinnati, Ohio, and had been longtime supporters of IDES' ministry including Jim's term serving on the IDES board of directors. Seeing that the news and media stations were failing to truly give enough time to report the incredible need of those suffering from hunger, the Willoughbys decided to use the resources God had given them in order to raise money and awareness for the hungry. Thus, the now iconic blue plastic SonFish banks were created. Over 30 years later, hundreds of thousands of dollars are still being raised for hunger relief using SonFish banks. It costs only $0.25 to provide one meal for a hungry child. Hard to believe, right? Why not save up as many quarters, dimes, nickels, and pennies as you can? Just like the boy who willingly gave his meager 5 loaves and 2 fish to Jesus and His disciples, and Jesus miraculously used the offering to feed thousands in one sitting, your offering of spare change can make a huge impact on the lives of those who do not know where their next meal may come from. With a SonFish Bank, there is no easier way to help the hungry and hurting. Merely save up your spare change inside the fish, and make a designated donation to IDES for the total amount once it is full. 100% of the funds you or your group raises with SonFish is given to hunger relief projects around the world. The banks can also be used as a fantastic teaching tool for children in communicating the idea of missions and God's power. SonFish Banks are free to individuals or groups as provided by IDES, thanks to the continuing generosity of the Willoughby family. Just fill out and submit the order form below. Assembling the SonFish for distribution is also one of IDES' most popular service projects. All it takes is two screws and a little bit of sanding. Whether by yourself or with the whole family, you can volunteer your time to assemble the banks, so that they may be shipped immediately upon one's order.

== Sources ==
- ides.org
