= Protective Action Criteria =

In the United States, the Emergency Management Issues Special Interest Group (EMI SIG) state that "Protective Action Criteria (PACs) are essential components for planning and response to uncontrolled releases of hazardous chemicals. These criteria, combined with estimates of exposure, provide the information necessary to evaluate chemical release events for the purpose of taking appropriate protective actions. During an emergency response, these criteria may be used to evaluate the severity of the event, to identify potential outcomes, and to decide what protective actions should be taken".

PAC values are based on the following exposure limit values:

- Acute Exposure Guideline Levels (AEGL) values published by the U.S. Environmental Protection Agency (EPA)
- Emergency Response Planning Guideline (ERPG) values produced by the American Industrial Hygiene Association (AIHA)
- Temporary Emergency Exposure Limit (TEEL) values developed by SCAPA

AEGL, ERPG and TEEL benchmark values are not available for all chemicals as the clinical effects are still an active research area. Consequently, when defining PAC values the following procedure is followed.

- Use AEGLs (including final or interim values) if they are available.
- If AEGLs are not available, use ERPGs.
- If neither AEGLs or ERPGs are available, use TEELs.

There are three levels of PAC value (1 to 3) where each successive value is associated with an increasingly severe effect from a higher level of exposure. Each level is defined as follows:

- PAC-1 : Mild, transient health effects.
- PAC-2 : Irreversible or other serious health effects that could impair the ability to take protective action.
- PAC-3 : Life-threatening health effects.
