= Provincial Disaster Management Authority (Punjab) =

Provincial Disaster Management Body of the Government of Punjab

Provincial Disaster Management Authority Punjab
Agency overview
- Formed: 2010; 16 years ago
- Jurisdiction: Government of Punjab
- Headquarters: Lahore, Punjab, Pakistan
- Agency executives: Lt. (R) Imran Qureshi, Director General
- Website: www.pdma.gop.pk

The Provincial Disaster Management Authority (PDMA) in Punjab is a governmental organization responsible for disaster management in the Punjab province of Pakistan. The PDMA works under the guidance of the National Disaster Management Authority (NDMA) of Pakistan.

The primary role of the PDMA is to enhance the preparedness, response, and recovery capabilities of the provincial government in the face of various disasters, including natural disasters like floods, earthquakes, droughts, and epidemics, as well as man-made disasters such as industrial accidents and terrorist incidents.

== See also ==
- National Disaster Management Act, 2010
- National Disaster Management Authority
