= Spontaneous unaffiliated volunteer =

A spontaneous unaffiliated volunteer (SUV) or event-based volunteer is an individual who volunteers to assist community members or community organizations, typically after a large-scale or well-publicized disaster. Because unaffiliated volunteers lack consistent training, and each volunteer's trustworthiness is unknown, SUV management can be very difficult and is the subject of a large amount of research and practice.

In many community organizing circles, the term "community volunteer" is preferred, emphasizing the community-centric nature of unaffiliated volunteerism.
