= Provincial Disaster Management Authority (Sindh) =

Provincial Disaster Management Body of the Government of Sindh

Provincial Disaster Management Authority Sindh
Agency overview
- Formed: 2010; 16 years ago
- Jurisdiction: Government of Sindh
- Headquarters: Karachi, Sindh, Pakistan
- Agency executives: Syed Salman Shah, Director General
- Website: www.pdma.gos.pk

The Provincial Disaster Management Authority (PDMA) is a government agency responsible for disaster management and emergency response in the province of Sindh, Pakistan. PDMA Sindh works to mitigate the impact of natural and man-made disasters, including floods, earthquakes, droughts, and other emergencies. It aims to enhance the resilience of communities, reduce vulnerabilities, and improve disaster preparedness and response.

== See also ==
- National Disaster Management Act, 2010
- National Disaster Management Authority
