= Rohn emergency scale =

Emergency magnitude measure

The Rohn emergency scale is a scale on which the magnitude (intensity) of an emergency is measured. It was first proposed in 2006, and explained in more detail in a peer-reviewed paper presented at a 2007 system sciences conference. The idea was further refined later that year. The need for such a scale was ratified in two later independent publications. It is the first scale that quantifies any emergency based on a mathematical model. The scale can be tailored for use at any geographic level – city, county, state or continent. It can be used to monitor the development of an ongoing emergency event, as well as forecast the probability and nature of a potential developing emergency and in the planning and execution of a National Response Plan.

== Existing emergency-related scales ==
Scales relating to natural phenomena that may result in an emergency are numerous. This section provides a review of several notable emergency related scales. They concentrate mainly on weather and environmental scales that provide a common understanding and lexicon with which to understand the level of intensity and impact of a crisis. Some scales are used before and/or during a crisis to predict the potential intensity and impact of an event and provide an understanding that is useful for preventative and recovery measures. Other scales are used for post-event classification. Most of these scales are descriptive rather than quantitative, which makes them subjective and ambiguous.

1805 Beaufort scale
1931 Modified Mercalli intensity scale
1935 Richter scale (superseded by the Moment magnitude scale)
1969 Saffir–Simpson scale
1971 Fujita scale (superseded by Enhanced Fujita scale in 2007)
1982 Volcanic explosivity index
1990 International Nuclear Event Scale
1999 Air quality index

== Variables common to all emergencies ==
According to the Rohn emergency scale, all emergencies can be described by three independent dimensions: (a) scope; (b) topographical change (or lack thereof); and (c) speed of change. The intersection of the three dimensions provides a detailed scale for defining any emergency, as depicted on the Emergency Scale Website.

=== Scope ===
The scope of an emergency in the Rohn scale is represented as a continuous variable with a lower limit of zero and a theoretical calculable upper limit. The Rohn Emergency Scale use two parameters that form the scope: percent of affected humans out of the entire population, and damages, or loss, as a percentage of a given gross national product (GNP). Where applied to a specific locality, this parameter may be represented by a gross state product, gross regional product, or any similar measure of economic activity appropriate to the entity under emergency.

=== Topography ===
A topographical change means a measurable and noticeable change in land characteristics, in terms of elevation, slope, orientation, and land coverage. These could be either natural (e.g., trees) or artificial (e.g., houses). Non-topographical emergencies are situations where the emergency is non-physical in nature. The collapse of the New York stock market in 1929 is such an example, and the 2008 financial crisis is another example. The model treats topographical change as a continuum ranging between 0 and 1 that gives the estimated visual fractional change in the environment.

=== Speed of change ===
An emergency is typified by a departure from normal state of affairs. The scale uses the change of the number of victims over time and economical losses over time to calculate a rate of change that is of utmost importance to society (e.g., life and a proxy for quality of life).

== Emergency scale mathematical model ==
The scale is a normalized function whose variables are scope (S), topography (T), and rate of change (D), expressed as

$$E = Emergency = f(S,T,D)$$.

These parameters are defined as follows:

=== Scope ===
$$\hbox{Scope}=\tfrac{\hbox{RawScope}}{\hbox{MaxScope}}$$
where
$$\hbox{RawScope}=\left(\tfrac{\hbox{Victims}}{\hbox{Population}} + \tfrac{\hbox{Monetary Losses}}{\hbox{GNP}}\right)^W$$
where
$$W=\left( \tfrac{\ln(\hbox{Victims})}{\ln(\hbox{Monetary Losses})} \right)^\beta$$
β is a coefficient which the model creator calculated to be 1.26 ± 0.03,
and
$$\hbox{MaxScope}=\left(\tfrac{0.7*\hbox{Population}}{\hbox{Population}} + \tfrac{0.5*\hbox{GNP}}{\hbox{GNP}}\right)^V$$,
where
$$V= \tfrac{\ln(\hbox{Victims})}{\ln(\hbox{Monetary Losses})}$$

The model loosely assumes that a society whose majority of the population (70% in this model) is affected and half of its GNP is drained as a result of a calamity reaches a breaking point of disintegration. Sociologists and economists may come up with a better estimate.

=== Topographical change ===
$\tfrac{\hbox{Volume before the event}}{\hbox{Volume after the event}}$ or zero for non-topographical events.

=== Rate of change ===
$\tfrac {d(\hbox{Victims})}{d(\hbox{Time})}$ and $\tfrac {d(\hbox{Losses})}{d(\hbox{Time})}$

comprise the rate of change that is of utmost importance to society and therefore incorporated in the model.

== Simplified scale for public communications ==
In some instances, it may be preferable to have an integral scale to more simply and dramatically convey the extent of an emergency, with a range, say, from 1 to 10, and 10 representing the direst emergency. This can be obtained from the function above in any number of ways. One of them is the ceiling function. Another one is a single number representing the volume under the 3D emergency scale.
