= Gilgit-Baltistan Disaster Management Authority =

Disaster Management Body of the Government of Gilgit-Baltistan

- گلگت بلتستان ڈیزاسٹر مینجمنٹ اتھارٹی

Agency overview
- Formed: 2010; 16 years ago
- Jurisdiction: Government of Gilgit-Baltistan
- Headquarters: PDMA headquarters Gilgit, Pakistan
- Website: www.gbdma.gog.pk

Gilgit-Baltistan Disaster Management Authority (GBDMA) is an organization which deals with natural or man-made disasters in Gilgit-Baltistan, Pakistan. GBDMA's mandate is to engage in activities concerning all four stages of Disaster Management Spectrum.

The GB Disaster Management Authority (GBDMA) was established in 2010 under the National Disaster Management Act, 2010.

== See also ==
- National Disaster Management Authority (Pakistan)
- Government of Gilgit-Baltistan
- State Disaster Management Authority (Azad Jammu & Kashmir)
