= International Recovery Platform =

The International Recovery Platform (IRP) is a joint initiative of United Nations agencies, international financial institutions, national and local governments, and non-governmental organizations engaged in disaster recovery. IRP was founded in 2005. It came after the Second World Conference on Disaster Reduction, to support implementation of the Hyogo Framework for Action (HFA). The group works to identify and address gaps in recovery knowledge, practice and constraints. In 2015, IRP aligned its work to support implementation of the newly adopted Sendai Framework for Disaster Risk Reduction. It concentrated on Priority Four – building back better in recovery, rehabilitation and reconstruction.

The International Recovery Platform is led by its 17-member Steering Committee, and is coordinated by a secretariat based in Kobe, Japan.

== IRP Steering Committee ==
The International Recovery Platform is a partnership composed of, and led by its Steering Committee. The 17 IRP Steering Committee members are:

- Asian Development Bank (ADB)
- Asian Disaster Reduction Center (ADRC)
- Cabinet Office, Government of Japan
- Centro de Coordinación para la Prevención de los Desastres Naturales en America Central, Punto Focal Regiona (CEPREDENAC)
- Hyogo Prefectural Government, Japan
- International Labour Organization (ILO)
- Ministry of Foreign Affairs, Italy
- Swiss Agency for Development and Cooperation (SDC)
- The World Bank
- UN Environment
- United Nations Centre for Regional Development (UNCRD)
- United Nations Development Programme (UNDP)
- United Nations Educational, Scientific and Cultural Organization (UNESCO)
- United Nations Human Settlements Programme (UN-HABITAT)
- United Nations Office for Disaster Risk Reduction (UNDRR)
- United Nations Office for Project Services (UNOPS)
- World Health Organization (WHO)

== Areas of work ==
=== International Recovery Forum ===
The International Recovery Forum is an annual conference organized by IRP in Kobe, Japan every January. The IRP Forum convenes senior policy makers and practitioners to exchange experiences and facilitate discussion on challenges to resilient recovery, and opportunities for rebuilding.

- 2020 Building Back Better through Resilient Infrastructure
- 2019 Attaining the Build Back Better Dividend
- 2018 Build Back Better in Urban Resilience
- 2017 Build Back Better Towards Resilient and Healthy Communities
- 2016 Sending the Message of Build Back Better from Hyogo, Japan
- 2015 Sending the Message of Building Back Better from Hyogo, Japan
- 2014 The Role of Private Sector in Disaster Recovery
- 2013 Resilient Recovery in Cities and Municipalities: Lessons on Integrating DRR into Recovery and Development Planning-Tohoku and Global Experiences and the Post 2015 Framework for DRR
- 2012 Regional Cooperation for Resilient Recovery
- 2011 Pre-Disaster Recovery Planning for Building Back Better
- 2010 From Resilient Recovery to Sustainable Development
- 2009 Building Back Better and Greener -Engaging Partners for Environmentally Sound Recovery
- 2008 Capacity Development for Better Recovery
- 2007 Progress of the Implementation of the Hyogo Framework for Action and Recovery from Tsunami and Earthquake
- 2006 1st Anniversary of the International Recovery Platform
- 2006 Lesson on Recovery Learned from Recent Major Disasters
- 2005 International Seminar on Post Disaster Recovery

=== Guidance Notes on Recovery ===
In 2010, the International Recovery Platform launched the Guidance Notes on Recovery series. The Guidance Notes were conceived to respond to a need for practical resources that can support recovery planners, decision-makers, and implementers with good practices and lessons gleaned from past recovery efforts. Since the inception of the series, IRP has issued a total thirteen volumes, organized by sectors and key themes in recovery.

- Health Supplementary Edition (2017)
- Private Sector (2016)
- Pre-Disaster Recovery Planning (2012)
- Climate Change (2010)
- Environment (2010)
- Governance (2010)
- Health (2010)
- Infrastructure (2010)
- Livelihoods (2010)
- Psychosocial (2010)
- Shelter (2010)
- Telling Live Lessons (2010)
