= National Disaster Management Authority (Pakistan) =

Pakistani government agency

Pakistan National Disaster Management Authority NDMA
- مقتدرہ قومی آفات انتظامی پاکستان

Agency overview
- Formed: 17 August 2007; 19 years ago
- Jurisdiction: Constitution of Pakistan
- Headquarters: Islamabad
- Agency executive: Lt Gen Muhammad Hassan khatak, Chairman NDMA
- Parent department: Prime Minister's Office (Pakistan)
- Child agency: National Institute of Disaster Management
- Website: www.ndma.gov.pk

The National Disaster Management Authority (Urdu: مقتدرہ قومی آفات انتظامی پاکستان, abbreviated as NDMA) is an autonomous and constitutionally established federal authority in Pakistan mandated to deal with the whole spectrum of disasters and their management in the country.

The NDMA formulates and enforces national disaster policies at federal and provisional levels and collaborates closely with various government ministries, military forces, and United Nations-based organizations to jointly coordinate efforts to conduct its disaster management, search and rescue, and wide range of humanitarian operations in the country and abroad. The NDMA aims to develop sustainable operational capacity and professional competence to undertake its humanitarian operations at its full capacity.

== Legislative history ==
- National Disaster Management Ordinance, 2006
- National Disaster Management Act, 2010

== Operational scope and constitutional definition ==
The functions and duties are defined and set by the Constitution of Pakistan in Article 239I in Chapter 1. The commission is charged with the following duties:

1. To act as the implementing, coordinating and monitoring body for disaster management;
2. To prepare the National Plan to be approved and implement, coordinate and monitor the implementation of the National policy;
3. To provide necessary technical assistance to the Provincial Governments and the Provincial Authorities for preparing their disaster management plans in accordance with the guidelines laid down by the National Commission;
4. To coordinate response in the event of any threatening disaster situation or disaster

The President may, except when the [Senate or] National Assembly is in session, if satisfied that circumstances exist which render it necessary to take immediate action, make and promulgate an Ordinance, as the circumstances may require.

— Article 81(1): Ordinances; Part-III, Chapter:2 The Parliament, source: The Constitution of Pakistan

== Chairman ==
Codified under the Article 89(1) of the Constitution of Pakistan, the institution is chaired by the appointed chairman, either civilian or military officer, and directly reports to the Prime Minister of Pakistan as its chief operations coordinator. As of present, the institution is currently chaired by Lieutenant General Inam Haider Malik of Pakistan Army as its appointed chairman.

Chairman	Term start	Term end	Sources
Lt Gen Farooq Ahmed Khan	2006	2010	
Lt Gen Nadeem Ahmed	2010	2011	
Dr Zafar Iqbal	2011	2013	
Maj Gen Saeed Aleem	2013	2015	
Maj Gen Asghar Nawaz	2015	2017	
Lt Gen Omar Mehmood Hayat	2017	2019	
Lt Gen Muhammad Afzal	2019	2020	
Lt Gen Akhtar Nawaz Satti	2020	October 2022	
Lt Gen Inam Haider Malik	October 2022	till-date	

== See also ==
- Federal Flood Commission
- Earthquake Reconstruction & Rehabilitation Authority
- National Disaster Management Act, 2010
- National Command and Operation Center (NCOC)

Provincial authorities

- Provincial Disaster Management Authority (Balochistan)
- Provincial Disaster Management Authority (Khyber Pakhtunkhwa)
- Provincial Disaster Management Authority (Punjab)
- Provincial Disaster Management Authority (Sindh)
- State Disaster Management Authority (Azad Kashmir)
- Gilgit Baltistan Disaster Management Authority
