= State Disaster Management Authority (Azad Kashmir) =

Disaster Management Body of the Government of Azad Kashmir

Agency overview
- Formed: 2010; 16 years ago
- Jurisdiction: Government of Azad Kashmir
- Headquarters: SDMA headquarters Muzaffarabad, Pakistan
- Agency executive: Sardar Waheed Khan, Director
- Website: www.sdma.pk

State Disaster Management Authority (SDMA) Azad Jammu & Kashmir is an autonomous authority mandated to act as the lead agency in disaster management, its mitigation and preparedness in Azad Jammu & Kashmir, Pakistan. Azad Jammu & Kashmir is highly prone to multiple hazards and has experienced worst disasters situation due to earthquake, torrential rain/flood, landslides & avalanches in the recent past.

After the 2005 Kashmir earthquake that killed 100,000 people and left another three million people displaced, with widespread devastation, the Government of Pakistan promulgated National Disaster Management Ordinance, 2006 and established National Disaster Management Authority as the focal point at the federal level, while State Disaster Management Authority (SDMA) was established for Pakistan-administered Kashmir.

Sardar Waheed Khan serves as the SDMA director as of May 2025.

== See also ==
- National Disaster Management Act, 2010
- 2005 Kashmir earthquake
- 2010 Pakistan floods
