= List of Bangladesh tornadoes =

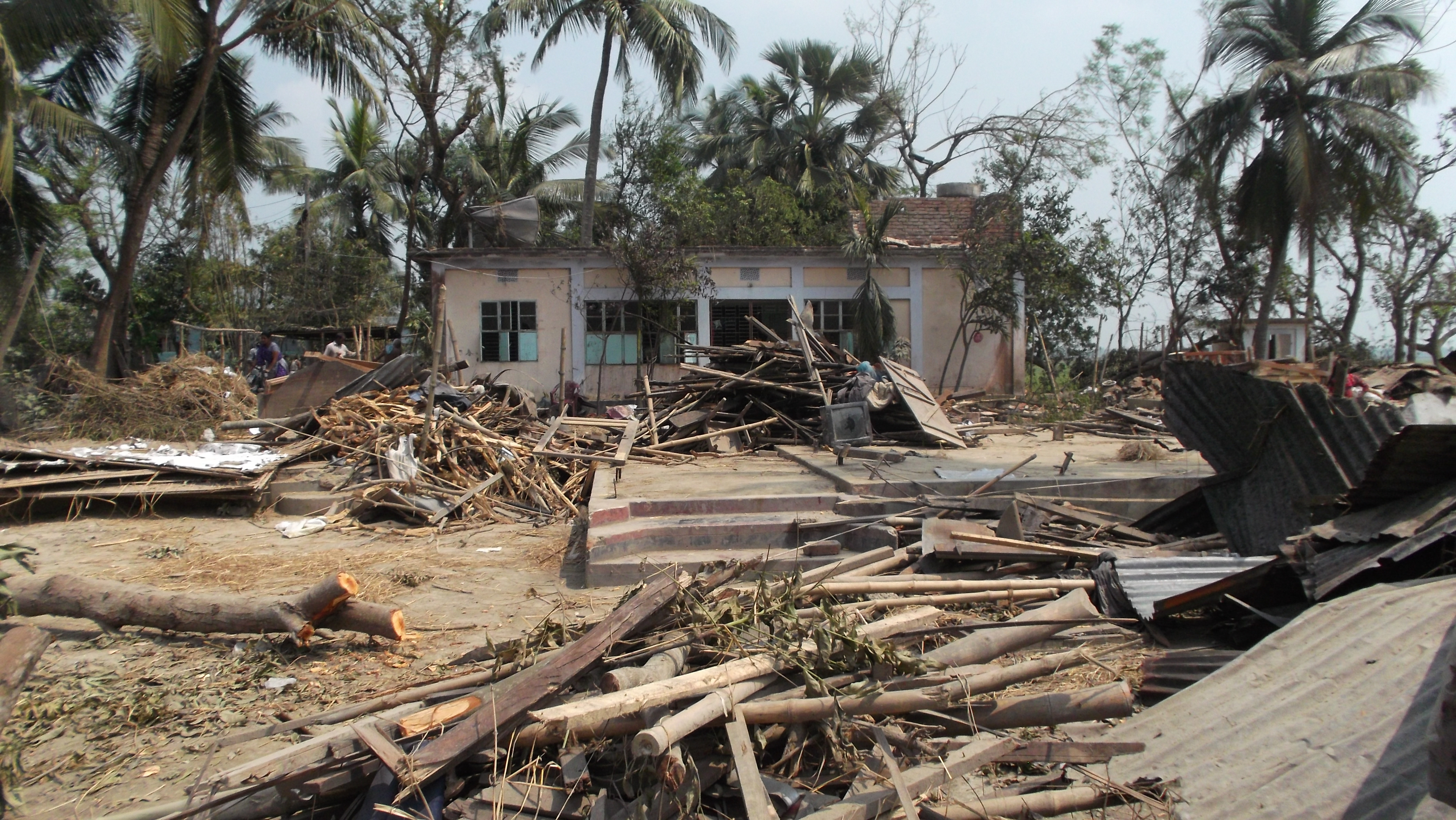
Debris from an F2 tornado in Brahmanbaria District

Tornadoes in Bangladesh occur at an average of 6 tornadoes annually. Most of these tornadoes are notably destructive and deadly, including the Daulatpur–Saturia tornado which was regarded as the deadliest worldwide with a total of approximately 1,300 people killed. They typically occur during the pre-monsoon months between March and May, often originating from nor'westers in the region. The country also has the highest average annual tornado death toll recorded with a total of 179 deaths per year over the period of 1967 to 1996; higher than the United States with an average of 65 recorded deaths per year between 1974 and 2003. The Ganges Basin, which consists most of Bangladesh, is susceptible to tornadoes.

== Climatology ==
A tornado is a violently rotating column of air that descends from the base of a thunderstorm onto the ground. They typically occur from severe thunderstorms associated with nor'westers or known locally as kalbaisakhi. Approximately 65% of all documented tornadoes in Bangladesh occur between the pre-monsoon months of March and May, with peak activity in April—which accounts for roughly 39% alone. Another 20% of documented tornadoes occurred during the post-monsoon months from September to October. During the pre-monsoon months, the low-level moisture from the Bay of Bengal, the relatively hot and dry air mass from the Indian subcontinent, and relatively strong flow at mid- to upper-levels provide enough vertical wind shear for an organized convection. These eventually lead to instability underneath an elevated mixed layer until a localized convergence along a dry line triggers a deep convection.

Central Bangladesh has the highest concentration of reported tornadoes with an average of 3 tornadoes per 10,000 square miles (26,000 km^{2}) annually. It is where most of the combined death toll from documented tornadoes occur. Notable events include the Daulatpur–Saturia tornado on 26 April 1989, considered to be the deadliest tornado in history, the Dhaka tornado on 17 April 1973 where it was estimated to have killed at least 681 people, and the Tangail tornado on 13 May 1996 where it killed around 605 people.

== Events ==
Event	Date	Area	Tornadoes	Casualties	Notes	Sources
Magura-Narail Districts, Bangladesh tornado	11 April 1964	Khulna Division, East Pakistan	–	>500 fatalities	A tornado destroyed several villages. Bodies were thrown into trees and cooking utensils were embedded into tree trunks.	
Bangladesh tornadoes of April 1969	14 April 1969	East Pakistan	≥2	923 fatalities	Two or three tornadoes touched down. One tornado went through the suburbs of Dhaka, killing 660 people. A second tornado touched down in Comilla, killing 263 people. The bodies of victims were mutilated, and a boy was thrown 400 metres (1,300 ft) into a pond.	
Dhaka District, Bangladesh tornado	17 April 1973	Dhaka Division, Bangladesh	≥1	681 fatalities	A tornado event struck Manikganj District of Dhaka. Two funnels reportedly merged then moved along a zig-zag path. Almost all houses in Balurchar village were completely leveled, as well as eight villages along the Kaliganga River. A boat was thrown 1,000 metres (3,300 ft)	
Madaripur-Shibchar, Bangladesh tornado	1 April 1977	Dhaka Division, Bangladesh	1	500 fatalities	Villages were completely devastated, and many villagers were struck by corrugated iron sheets. A total of 43 bodies were thrown into a river.	
Daulatpur–Saturia tornado	26 April 1989	Dhaka Division, Bangladesh	1	>1,300 fatalities, 12,000 injuries	1.5 miles wide, deadliest tornado in world history. Estimated as an F3-F4 tornado.	
Jamalpur-Tangail Districts, Bangladesh tornado	13 May 1996	Dhaka Division, Bangladesh	–	600 fatalities, 37,248 injuries	80 villages were flattened, with numerous wood and tin homes demolished. A boarding school collapsed and several large buildings, including a movie house, were destroyed.	
Savar and Gazipur Districts, Bangladesh tornadedo	19 September 2000	Dhaka Division, Bangladesh	2	2 fatalities, 5+ injuries	A tornado moved through 5 villages, destroying 500 homes, many of which were built from bamboo and tin. Another tornado struck an industrial area, collapsing 3 factories. Many others sustained light injuries.	
Brahmanbaria District tornado	4 May 2003	Brahmanbaria District, Bangladesh	1+	20+ Fatalities	At least 20 people were killed by a tornado in several remote villages in the Brahmanbaria District of Bangladesh.	
Bangladesh tornado	17 July 2005	Gaibandha and Rangpur districts, Bangladesh	1	31 fatalities, 900 injuries	Huts were blown away and 700 mud and straw houses flattened among other damages.	
Bangladesh tornado	27 July 2005	20 villages in Mymensingh and Netrokona districts, Bangladesh	1	66 fatalities, 2,000 injuries	Entire villages were destroyed. Numerous people were hit by tin roofing or injured by other flying objects.	
Bangladesh tornado	17 August 2005	Almost 20 farming villages in Netrokona and Mymensingh Districts, Bangladesh		48 fatalities, 700+ injuries	36 people were killed in Netrokona, 12 others died in Mymensingh. Thousands of flimsy huts were blown away. Exact number of injuries unknown.	
Bangladesh tornadoes	11–15 October 2007	Jamalpur, Sunamganj, Barisal, Gopalganj and Bhola Districts, Bangladesh	5	7 fatalities	Two outbreaks of severe storms occurred. On October 11, two tornadoes hit Sunamganj and Jamalpur District. On October 15, three waterspout tornadoes embedded in severe storms moved ashore. Over 500 houses were destroyed, over 3,000 people were left homeless.	
2013 Brahmanbaria tornado	22 March 2013	Dhaka, Bangladesh	1	20 fatalities, 300+ injuries	More than 500 homes damaged, including a jail which partially collapses, killing a guard. Trees and power pylons were toppled.	
Faridpur tornado	21 August 2016	Faridpur District, Bangladesh	1	6 fatalities, 100+ injuries	An unusual monsoonal tornado struck Faridpur, causing substantial damage. Many trees were uprooted, and several homes were destroyed.	
Northern Bangladesh tornadoes	5 October 2025	Rangpur Division, Bangladesh	2	0 fatalities, 30+ injuries	Two tornadoes hit northern Bangladesh. Over 500 homes were destroyed in Nilphamari District, and 30 people were injured. Widespread structural damage was reported in Rangpur District, with over 1,200 homes damaged or destroyed.	

=== June 17 ===
List of confirmed tornadoes – Wednesday, June 17, 2026 (Note: All dates are based on the local time zone where the tornado touched down; however, all times are in Coordinated Universal Time for consistency.)
EF#	Location	Region	Country	Start coord.	Time (UTC)	Path length	Max. width
EFU	Cox's Bazar	Chittagong	Bangladesh	Unknown	08:45	Unknown	Unknown
EFU	A waterspout moved ashore where it destroyed 52 wooden beach chairs and 61 beach umbrellas.						

== See also ==
- List of Asian tornadoes and tornado outbreaks
