= April 1983 Basirhat–Bongaon tornado outbreak =

Tornado outbreak in India

Basirhat–Bongaon tornado
Meteorological history
- Formed: 12 April 1983

Tornado
- Highest winds: 330 km/h (210 mph)

Overall effects
- Fatalities: 28
- Injuries: ~1,500
- Areas affected: Basirhat, Habra, Gaighata Blocks, North 24 Parganas district, West Bengal, India

The Basirhat-Bongaon tornado outbreak (also known as the Gaighata tornado) occurred on April 12, 1983, specifically in the Gaighata block of Bongaon subdivision in West Bengal near major cities like Basirhat and Bongaon. It was a severe tornado lasting about two minutes with winds estimated around 330 kmph. The disaster resulted in the deaths of 28 people and injuries to about 500 others. The tornado caused widespread devastation, destroying several thousand huts, uprooting tubewells, and severely damaging even concrete buildings across 20 densely populated villages in the area.

== Overview ==
The Gaighata tornado struck on April 12, 1983, in the Gaighata block of North 24 Parganas district, West Bengal, India. It was a rare and powerful event that lasted for about five minutes but caused widespread destruction in nearly 20 villages near the border of Kolkata. The tornado damaged thousands of huts, uprooted trees and tubewells, and severely affected even concrete structures. Winds were estimated to reach around 330 km/h, making it one of the strongest tornadoes recorded in India. This tornado caused widespread damage in Basirhat and Bongaon subdivision.

== Meteorological synopsis ==
Synoptic reanalysis from the National Centers for Environmental Prediction (NCEP/NCAR) depicts a disturbed mid–tropospheric pattern in the days preceding the event. On 12 April 1983, the 500 mb geopotential height field revealed a southward extension of a trough over northern India. Height values across eastern India and West Bengal were in the range of 5820–5880 metres, a configuration often linked to increased instability. Such a pattern promotes vertical wind shear, while at the surface warm and moisture-laden air from the Bay of Bengal prevailed. The interaction of upper-level westerlies with low-level easterlies created an environment conducive to organised convection. In the pre-monsoon season, this dynamical setup frequently generates violent squalls known locally as Kalbaisakhi. This tornado of 12 April 1983 emerged under precisely these meteorological conditions.

== Impact and casualties ==
The tornado resulted in 28 fatalities and left approximately 1,500 people injured, with 140 sustaining serious injuries. Thousands of huts were destroyed, tubewells were uprooted, and even concrete buildings suffered severe damage. An entire pond was reportedly sucked dry by the tornado, highlighting its immense power. Winds were estimated to have reached speeds of around 330 km/h.

== See also ==
- 2013 North India flood
- 2025 Kishtwar district flash flood
- September 2025 Kolkata cloudburst
- Daulatpur–Saturia tornado

== Bibliography ==
- Dewan, Ashraf; Finch, Jonathon (July 8, 2024). "Bengal Tornadoes". Bangladesh and East India Tornadoes Background Information.
