= Climate of Dhaka =

Dhaka is a hot, humid, and humid tropical climate area. Under the Köppen climate classification, Dhaka has a tropical humid and dry climate. The city has an annual mean temperature of 25°C (77°F) during the rainy season and a monthly mean of 18°C (64°F) in January and 29°C (84°F) in August. About 80% of the annual mean rainfall, or 1,854 millimetres (73.0 in) until the end of September. Increasing air and water pollution emanating from traffic congestion and industrial waste are serious problems affecting public health and the quality of life in the city. Water bodies and wetlands around Dhaka are facing destruction as these are being filled up to construct multi-storied buildings and other real estate developments. Coupled with pollution, such erosion of natural habitats threatens to destroy much of the regional biodiversity.

Cold weather is unusual in and around Dhaka. When temperatures decrease to 8 °C (46 °F) or less, people without warm clothing and living in inadequate homes may die from the cold.

== Factors ==
Dhaka has a tropical wet and dry climate. The monsoon season brings nearly 80% of the annual average rainfall of 1,854 millimeters (73 in) and occurs between May and September.

- Southwest Monsoon occurs from June till September during the summer months. During this period very heavy rainfall lashes the city as well as the entire country. Flash floods are common in Dhaka almost every year.
- Tropical Storms do occur during the summer months from April till June and then from September till December. These cyclones occur almost every year in Bangladesh though their intensity varies from year to year.
- Tornadoes are fairly common in Bangladesh as it is one of the most frequently hit countries in the world, behind the United States and Canada.

== Impact of climate change ==
Climate change has forced many people in Bangladesh living in rural areas to migrate to cities that has caused a sharp rise in the slum population of Dhaka. As Bangladesh is only less than 20 feet above sea level, there are fears and concerns that by the end of the 21st century, more than a quarter of the country will be inundated and 15 million people will be displaced due to sea level rise. The population of Dhaka, currently 13 million people, is projected to increase to 20 million by the year 2025. This raises fears of water-borne diseases and outbreaks of several other diseases. A UN and WWF report warned that Dhaka tops the risk of climate change vulnerability in Asia.

== Monsoon rainfall of Dhaka ==
The Monsoon season typically begins from June and ends in September. The following is the annual monsoon rainfall for the last few years based on data from the Bangladesh Meteorological Department.

- In 2000, a total of 5,220 millimetres (206 in) was recorded.
- In 2001, a total of 5,590 millimetres (220 in) was recorded.
- In 2002, a total of 7,257 millimetres (285.7 in) was recorded.
- In 2003, a total of 4,934 millimetres (194.3 in) was recorded.
- In 2004, a total of 8,308 millimetres (327.1 in) was recorded.
- In 2005, a total of 6,903 millimetres (271.8 in) was recorded.
- In 2006, a total of 7,137 millimetres (281.0 in) was recorded.
- In 2007, a total of 8,895 millimetres (350.2 in) was recorded.
- In 2008, a total of 6,712 millimetres (264.3 in) was recorded.
- In 2009, a total of 6,252 millimetres (246.1 in) was recorded.
- In 2010, a total of 5,016 millimetres (197.5 in) was recorded.
- In 2011, a total of 4,590 millimetres (181 in) was recorded.

== Extreme weather events ==
Extreme weather events including tropical cyclones, tornadoes, cloudburst and flash floods have impacted Dhaka:

- In 1956, about 326 millimetres (12.8 in) of rain was recorded in 24 hours in Dhaka.
- In 1970, a Category-3 tropical cyclone killed 500,000 people in the coastal area, which also had a severe impact in Dhaka.
- In 1989, a tornado killed 1,300 people in Dhaka Division.
- In 1991, a Category-5 tropical cyclone ravaged coastal Bangladesh, impacting Dhaka with severe rain and damaging wind.
- In 2004, a record-breaking 341 millimetres (13.4 in) mm of rain was recorded in Dhaka in 24 hours.
- In 2009, about 333 millimetres (13.1 in) of rain was recorded in Dhaka in 24 hours.
- In 2023, on April 16, the Dhaka area recorded a maximum of 40.6 °C (105.1 °F), the highest April temperature in the region since 1965.

== Statistics ==
Climate data for Dhaka
Month	Jan	Feb	Mar	Apr	May	Jun	Jul	Aug	Sep	Oct	Nov	Dec	Year
Record high °C (°F)	31.1 (88.0)	34.4 (93.9)	40.6 (105.1)	42.2 (108.0)	41.1 (106.0)	36.7 (98.1)	35.0 (95.0)	36.1 (97.0)	37 (99)	37.4 (99.3)	34.4 (93.9)	30.6 (87.1)	42.2 (108.0)
Mean daily maximum °C (°F)	25.4 (77.7)	28.1 (82.6)	32.5 (90.5)	33.7 (92.7)	32.9 (91.2)	32.1 (89.8)	31.4 (88.5)	31.6 (88.9)	31.6 (88.9)	31.6 (88.9)	29.6 (85.3)	26.4 (79.5)	30.6 (87.1)
Daily mean °C (°F)	19.1 (66.4)	21.8 (71.2)	26.5 (79.7)	28.7 (83.7)	28.7 (83.7)	29.1 (84.4)	28.8 (83.8)	29.0 (84.2)	28.8 (83.8)	27.7 (81.9)	24.4 (75.9)	20.3 (68.5)	26.1 (79.0)
Mean daily minimum °C (°F)	12.7 (54.9)	15.5 (59.9)	20.4 (68.7)	23.6 (74.5)	24.5 (76.1)	26.1 (79.0)	26.2 (79.2)	26.3 (79.3)	25.9 (78.6)	23.8 (74.8)	19.2 (66.6)	14.1 (57.4)	21.5 (70.7)
Record low °C (°F)	6.1 (43.0)	6.7 (44.1)	10.6 (51.1)	16.7 (62.1)	14.4 (57.9)	19.4 (66.9)	21.1 (70.0)	21.7 (71.1)	21.1 (70.0)	17.2 (63.0)	11.1 (52.0)	7.2 (45.0)	6.1 (43.0)
Average precipitation mm (inches)	7.7 (0.30)	28.9 (1.14)	65.8 (2.59)	156.3 (6.15)	339.4 (13.36)	340.4 (13.40)	373.1 (14.69)	316.5 (12.46)	300.4 (11.83)	172.3 (6.78)	34.4 (1.35)	12.8 (0.50)	2,148 (84.57)
Average precipitation days	2	3	5	10	15	14	17	16	13	7	2	1	105
Average relative humidity (%)	71	64	62	71	76	82	83	82	83	78	73	73	75
Mean monthly sunshine hours	220.3	225.3	256.3	237.8	220.9	142.2	131.5	140.6	152.7	228.6	236.3	242.6	2,435.1
Source 1: Bangladesh Meteorological Department
Source 2: Sistema de Clasificación Bioclimática Mundial (extremes 1934–1994), Deutscher Wetterdienst (sun, 1961–1990)
