= 2025 India–Pakistan floods =

Flood in Indian sub-continent

In August and September 2025, widespread flooding affected parts of eastern Pakistan and northern India. The floods were caused by particularly heavy monsoon rains in mountainous areas of the Indian state of Himachal Pradesh, and the Indian-administered union territory of Jammu and Kashmir. The resulting flash floods forced Indian authorities to open dams on several rivers flowing into both Indian and Pakistani Punjab, leading to widespread flooding in downstream areas. Over 1,400 villages in Pakistan's Punjab province were flooded, while 1400 villages in the Indian state of Punjab were also affected, displacing over 1.2 million people in Pakistan and 300,000 in India.

== Regions affected ==
Heavy rains had been falling in Indian-administered Kashmir throughout August, with a massive cloudburst in Kishtwar on 14 August, killing 68 people. In late August, more rivers in Jammu and Kashmir began to rise. Two days later, a cloudburst hit Kathua, leaving 7 dead and several injured. On 25 August, the Indian government notified Pakistan of water releases along dams on the Tawi river, which flows through Jammu into Sialkot district of Punjab, Pakistan.

Pakistan then evacuated at least 125,000 people from northeastern regions of the province. In Kasur, 75,000 people were evacuated while in Bahawalnagar along the Sutlej, 35,000 people were evacuated. Jammu city was then affected by flooding, which displaced at least 3500 people. The Sutlej and Beas rose rapidly by August 27, causing Indian Punjab and Jammu Division to declare schools closed. 13 districts were initially affected, all the border districts as well as districts along the Beas and Sutlej.

These floods also affected Punjab and its neighbouring states like Himachal Pardesh, Jammu & Kashmir, Uttarakhand, Arunachal Pradesh, Bihar, Chhattisgarh, West Bengal and also in state of Punjab in Pakistan.

=== Punjab ===
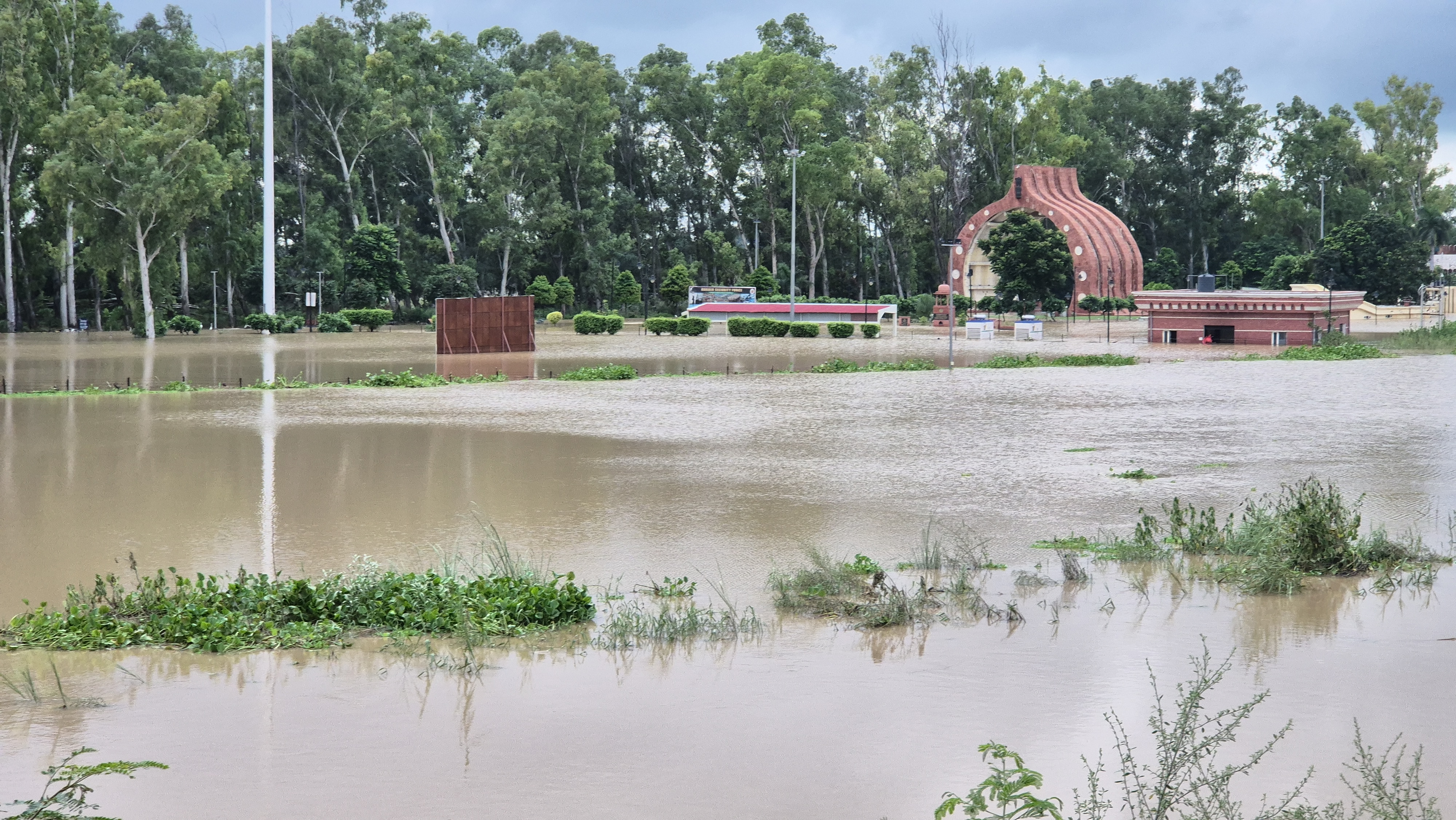
Flooding at Hussainwala Ganda Singh Wala near the international border during the 2025 flood

In August 2025, around 1400 villages in more than 13 districts of Punjab, India faced a devastating flood crisis, regarded as the worst in nearly four decades since 1988. There were about 55 fatalities. The floods, caused by unusually heavy monsoon rains in the upper catchment areas (particularly Himachal Pradesh and Jammu & Kashmir), along with surplus water releases from several dams — notably Pong, Ranjit Sagar, and Bhakra — which intensified flooding in downstream districts, particularly along the Ravi, Beas and Sutlej rivers.

The severely affected districts of Punjab were Gurdaspur, Amritsar, Ferozepur, Pathankot, Kapurthala and Fazilka. Other districts like Tarn Taran, Hoshiarpur, Kapurthala, Rupnagar, Moga, Sangrur, Barnala, Patiala and SAS Nagar (Mohali) also been heavily impacted by the floods suffering crop damage, displacement, and infrastructure loss.

Over 1,400 villages across Punjab were inundated, and more than 3,71,475 acres of farmland were submerged, particularly in districts such as Gurdaspur, Kapurthala, Ferozepur, Pathankot, Fazilka, Amritsar and Barnala. The floods affected approximately 3.5 lakh residents in the state with more than 29 dead, prompting large-scale evacuations, widespread disruption and school closures. About 30 km of fencing along the zero line on the Indo-Pak international border got damaged. The BSF post near the Kartarpur Corridor got submerged, and BSF personnel temporarily relocated to Gurdwara Darbar Sahib in Dera Baba Nanak.

== Special Health Campaign ==
The Punjab state government (India) launched a clean-up and fogging drive in flood-hit livestock shelters to protect around 253,000 animals across 713 villages from water-borne and vector-borne diseases. Measures included the distribution of disinfectants such as potassium permanganate, mass vaccination campaigns against hemorrhagic septicaemia, and emergency veterinary care.

== Response and relief efforts in Punjab ==
=== Rescue operations ===
- National and state-level agencies — NDRF, SDRF, Army, BSF, and local NGO's and authorities—mounted extensive rescue operations. In Gurdaspur, the Army evacuated 27 individuals via helicopter airlift from Lassian. Around 11,330 persons were evacuated to safer places with the combined efforts of the Army, NDRF, BSF and the district authorities. Drones were deployed to deliver medicines and food in remote areas, and amphibious vehicles facilitated evacuations in Ramdas, Amritsar. Relief camps provided shelter to thousands of displaced residents.
- Civil and humanitarian involvement — Organisations like Khalsa Aid, Global Sikhs, The Kalgidhar Trust, 5 Rivers Heart Association and many more initiated large-scale relief operations in districts like Gurdaspur, Kapurthala, Ferozepur, and Abohar, delivering essentials such as drinking water, ration, medical aid, and fodder for livestock. Political parties and local leaders were also active: the Aam Aadmi Party's youth and women wings distributed food and supplies, while the Rural Development Minister sent cattle feed to farmers in Fazilka.
- Indian Celebrities — Punjabi singers such as Diljit Dosanjh, Satinder Sartaj, Mankirt Aulakh, Gippy Grewal, Karan Aujla, Ranjit Bawa, Jas Bajwa, Harf Cheema, Resham Singh Anmol, Jasbir Jassi, Gurdas Maan, Jordan Sandhu, Inderjit Nikku, Ravinder Grewal, Harjit Harman, Hustinder, Tarsem Jassar, Gulab Sidhu, R Nait, Preet Harpal and actors Gurpreet Ghuggi, Nimrat Khaira, Sunanda Sharma, Sonam Bajwa, Ammy Virk, Randeep Hooda, Sonu Sood, Kapil Sharma, Salman Khan, Akshay Kumar and many other stars are continuously helping people in flood-affected villages by sending food, water and other essential items or financial assistance either personally or through their teams.

=== Government action and emergency measures ===
- Schools across Punjab were closed from August 27–30 and later this closure was extended along with colleges upto September 7, 2025 as a safety precaution.
- The state government, led by Chief Minister Bhagwant Mann, conducted aerial surveys and ordered a special girdawari (damage assessment), promising full compensation for flood-related losses.
- After the Punjab cabinet meeting on september 8, the Chief Minister of state announced that compensation of Rs 20,000 per acre will be given to the flood-affected farmers and Rs 4 lakh will be given to the families of those who have lost someone.

== See also ==
- 2025 Uttarakhand flash flood
- 2025 Punjab, Pakistan floods
