= September 2025 Kolkata cloudburst =

Heavy rain and flooding in Kolkata, India

- Date: start date 23 september 2025
- Time: 12:00 am to 5:00 am as per kolkata alipur meterogical department (IST)
- Location: Kolkata, West Bengal, India
- Type: Flash flood
- Cause: very heavy rain
- Deaths: 12
- Injuries: 30+
- Missing: 2

On 23 September 2025, an intense cloudburst occurred in Kolkata, India, causing widespread waterlogging and flash floods around the city. The incident caused 9 deaths in Kolkata and 2 deaths in nearby districts, 30 injuries and at least 2 people left missing. Because of the heavy rainfall, many areas of Kolkata including Bansdroni, Bijoygarh, Jadavpur and Garia were waterlogged for three days.

== Overview ==
Following the commencement of preparations for Kolkata's most celebrated festival, Durga Puja, a strong cloudburst occurred in the early morning hours of September 23, 2025, causing severe flash floods and damage across the city. At least 9 people were reported dead due to electrocution. Fatalities were reported across different parts of Kolkata, with one death each in Gariahat, Garfa, Ekbalpur, Beniapukur, Shakespeare Sarani, Netajinagar, Haridevpur, Narendrapur, and Behala .

== Meteorological observation ==
Indian Meteorological Department recorded heavy rainfall throughout the city. The southern and eastern parts of the city experienced the most intense rainfall. The Kolkata Municipal Corporation reported that Garia Kamdahari recorded 332 mm of rain in just a few hours. Other areas recorded significant rainfall, including Jodhpur Park with 285 mm, Kalighat 280 mm, Topsia 275 mm, Ballygunge 264 mm, Alipore 251 mm and Thantania in north Kolkata 195 mm. In addition to Kolkata, heavy rainfall affected several surrounding suburban areas and nearby cities. According to a bulletin released by the India Meteorological Department (IMD), Basirhat received 109 mm of rainfall and Barrackpore received 71 mm of rainfall.

== Outcome ==
Due to extreme rainfall, several famous Durga Puja committee's pandals of Kolkata including Singhi Park, Hatibagan Nabin Pally, Chaltabagan Sarvajonin, Nalin Sarkar Street got damaged. Waterlogging occurred in several pandals including Maddox Square, Tridhara Sammilani, Bullygunge Cultural Association. Indian Institute of Engineering Science and Technology, Shibpur, University of Calcutta and Jadavpur University suspended all academic activities on Tuesday. Train and metro services had been disrupted, and many Durga Puja pandals were damaged across the city. Many roads were closed due to the waterlogging occurred in several busy roads like Eastern Metropolitan Bypass, Central Avenue, Rashbehari Avenue etc. Thirty flights were cancelled because of bad weather with Spicejet and IndiGo issuing safety advisories for those passengers who were travelling to or from Kolkata Airport. West Bengal Chief Minister Mamata Banerjee announced the Durga Puja vacation before three days of its scheduled time due to the hazardous weather conditions prevailing in Kolkata. The rain was most intense in the southern and eastern parts of Kolkata; the neighbourhoods of Garia and Jodhpur Park received the highest rainfall.

== See also ==
- 2025 Kishtwar district flash flood
- 2025 Uttarakhand flash flood
