= 2025 Punjab floods =

2025 Punjab Floods may refer to:

- 2025 Punjab, India floods
- 2025 Punjab, Pakistan floods

== See also ==
- 2025 Pakistan floods
- Floods in India
