= 2021 Hunzar Kishtwar cloudburst =

Cloudburst in Kishtwar, Jammu and Kashmir

Meteorological history
- Formed: 28 July 2021

Overall effects
- Casualties: 26 deaths (approx. 18 missing in the floods), 17 critical injuries
- Damage: Many houses, shops, and local infrastructure
- Areas affected: India

A cloudburst occurred on 28 July 2021 in Hunzar hamlet in the Dachhan area of the Kishtwar district in Jammu & Kashmir, resulting in 26 deaths and 17 injuries.

== Casualties ==
As per reports, seven dead bodies were recovered while 19 were not found in the initial days following the cloudburst. As of October 5, 2021, one out of the 19 missing was found after more than 70 days, while 18 others remained missing. In April 2023, after the ruling of Jammu and Kashmir High Court, the government declared the 18 missing persons as dead.

== See also ==
- Kishtwar Cloudburst 2025
