= Daulatpur–Saturia tornado =

1989 tornado in Bangladesh

- Damage from the tornado

Meteorological history
- Formed: 12:30 UTC on 26 April 1989

F4 tornado
- on the Fujita scale
- Highest winds: 338 to 419 km/h (210 to 260 mph)

Overall effects
- Fatalities: 1,300
- Injuries: 12,000
- Areas affected: Manikganj, Dhaka, Bangladesh
- Part of the tornado outbreaks of 1989

The Daulatpur–Saturia tornado was a violent tornado that occurred in Manikganj District, Bangladesh on April 26, 1989. While it was destructive and extremely deadly, there is great uncertainty about the death toll. Official estimates from the World Meteorological Organization indicate that it killed approximately 1,300 people, which would make it the deadliest tornado in history. The tornado affected the cities of Daulatpur and Saturia the most, moving east through Daulatpur and eventually northeast into Saturia. Previously, the area that the tornado hit had been in a state of drought for six months.

== Background ==
The Ganges Basin, comprising the entirety of Bangladesh, is frequented by severe weather. Storms that are capable of producing tornadoes in this region are most common during the pre- and post-monsoon months. An average of six tornadoes occur annually in Bangladesh, with peak activity in April. The pre-monsoon months (March to May) display the most favorable conditions for severe weather. During this time, convective available potential energy—an indicator of atmospheric instability whereby higher values denote a greater likelihood of thunderstorms—and wind shear are conducive to the development of rotating thunderstorms. Instability is greatest over West Bengal, India, and adjacent areas of Bangladesh. Storms frequently develop in this region and travel southeast across the country. These storms are locally referred to as norwesters or Kalbaisakhi.

== Event and aftermath ==
On 25 April 1989, a 1,000 hPa (29.53 inHg) area of low pressure propagated over Bihar and West Bengal, India, with a trough extending east across Bangladesh and into Manipur, India. The system remained largely stationary throughout the day through 26 April. On that day, another low approached from Madhya Pradesh, and in conjunction with a ridge over China, the pressure gradient became tighter across Bangladesh. Warm, moist air flowed northeast from the Bay of Bengal while cool, dry air flowed south from the Himalayas. In the upper-levels of the atmosphere above the low, strong westerly winds from the jet stream created ample wind shear, a key factor in the development of supercell thunderstorms capable of producing tornadoes. The jet stream became particularly intense on 26 April, with a sounding from Dhaka observing 240 km/h (150 mph) winds at a height of 10.6 km (35,000 ft). An established dry line over western Bangladesh served as a focal point for thunderstorm development. By 12:00 UTC, all the aforementioned factors served to produce severe thunderstorms across the country.

Around 12:30 UTC, a tornado touched down near Daulatpur in the Manikganj District and traveled east, soon striking Saturia. It caused tremendous damage across a 150 km^{2} (58 mi^{2}) area covering three upazilas, with Saturia being hardest-hit. Its path was about 80 km (50 mi) long. A World Meteorological Organization news letter noted the tornado as F3 on the Fujita Scale. However, the stated wind estimate of 338 to 418 km/h (210 to 260 mph) would rank it at F4 intensity.

According to the World Meteorological Organization in 2017, the tornado killed roughly 1,300 people and injured 12,000. Damage was extensive, as countless trees were uprooted and every home within a six square kilometer area of the tornado's path was completely destroyed. An article in the Bangladesh Observer stated, "The devastation was so complete, that barring some skeletons of trees, there were no signs of standing infrastructures". Approximately 80,000 people were left homeless. A second tornado struck the Narsingdi District, killing 5 people and injuring 500 others.

== See also ==
- 1925 Tri-State tornado – The deadliest tornado recorded in the United States
- 1973 Faridpur District tornado
- 1996 Bangladesh tornado
- 2013 Brahmanbaria tornado
- April 1983 Basirhat-Bongaon tornado outbreak
- List of Asian tornadoes and tornado outbreaks
- Lists of tornadoes and tornado outbreaks
