= Mango showers =

Colloquial term for pre-monsoon rain showers

Mango showers is a colloquial term to describe the occurrence of pre-monsoon rainfall in March-May. Sometimes, these rains are referred to generically as ‘April rains’ or ‘Summer showers’. They are notable across much of South and Southeast Asia, including India, and Cambodia. In southern Asia, these rains greatly influence human activities because of the control the rains have on crops that are culturally significant like mangoes and coffee.

These rains normally occur from March to April, although their arrival is often difficult to predict. Their intensity can range from light showers to heavy and persistent thunderstorms. In India, the mango showers occur as the result of thunderstorm development over the Bay of Bengal. They are also known as 'Kaal Baisakhi' in Bengal, as Bordoisila in Assam and as Cherry Blossom showers or Coffee Showers in Karnataka.

Towards the close of summer, pre-monsoon showers are common, especially in Kerala, Karnataka and parts of Tamil Nadu in India. They help in the early ripening of mangoes and are hence often referred to as "Mango showers."

== See also ==
- Nor'westers – pre-monsoon summer rainfall in Eastern South Asia
