= Guerrilla rainstorm =

Japanese expression to describe a short, localized downpour

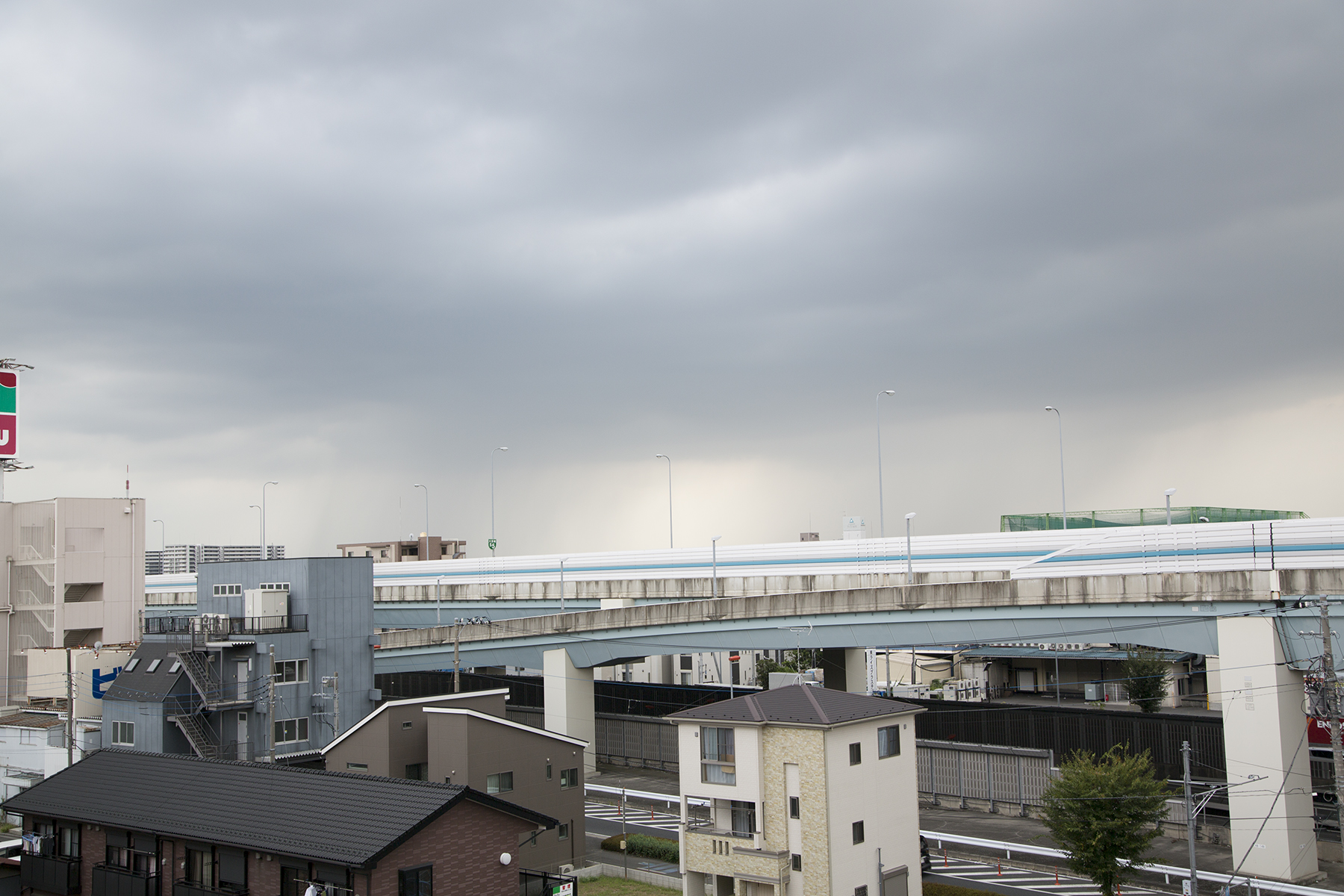
Rain in Saitama Prefecture

A guerrilla rainstorm (ゲリラ豪雨, gerira gō'u) is a Japanese expression used to describe a short, localized downpour of over 100 mm per hour of rain caused by the unpredictable formation of a cumulonimbus cloud. The term is often used by the Japanese media in reporting such events, but does not have an official meaning nor is it used by the Japan Meteorological Agency.

== History of usage ==
The first example of the term being used was by the Yomiuri Shimbun in August 1969. It carries the same meaning as the term cloudburst (集中豪雨, shūchū gō'u), but is differentiated by the added feature of being difficult to forecast, hence the reference to the aspect of ambush associated with the term guerrilla warfare. Neither "guerrilla rainstorm" nor "cloudburst" is a defined term used by the meteorological agency, which instead uses the term "localised downpour" (局地的大雨, kyokuchiteki ōame).

Usage of the term spread in the private media from 2006.

== See also ==
- Cloudburst
