= 1973 Faridpur District tornado =

1973 tornado in Bangladesh

- Location of Faridpur District, where the tornado tracked through

Meteorological history
- Date: 17 April 1973

F4 tornado
- on the Fujita scale
- Highest winds: 235 mph (378 km/h)

Overall effects
- Fatalities: Disputed: 681 (official); 1,000 (unofficial)
- Injuries: 1,000 (estimated)
- Areas affected: Areas southwest of Dhaka, Bangladesh
- Part of the tornadoes of 1973

On 17 April 1973, an extremely deadly and devastating tornado moved through areas southwest of Dhaka in Faridpur District, located in Bangladesh. The tornado was the third-deadliest in world history, killing an estimated 681 to 1,000 people; 1,000 more were believed to have been injured.

== Tornado summary ==
The tornado touched down west of Dhaka in Manikganj District, moving along the Kaliganga river to the southeast. Along its path through Manikganj District, the tornado moved in an inconsistent pattern, taking on a multiple-vortex structure as it widened. Later studies found that at this point in its life, the tornado was a series of two funnels that merged into one larger vortex. Further southeast, the tornado impacted nine more villages and produced heavy damage to structures in Balurchar. Sheikh Mujibur Rahman, who was the prime minister of Bangladesh at the time of the tornado, stated that "not a single dwelling was traceable" in the Balurchar area. Bodies of victims from the tornado in Balurchar were strewn around the area; a boat with three occupants off the shore from the town was lofted by the tornado and thrown over 1,000 metres (3,300 ft) away.

681 people were confirmed to have been killed by the tornado and a total of 15,000 more people were affected in some way by the event. Estimates for death counts as high as 1,000 people were given for the tornado, making it one of the deadliest in world history.

== See also ==
- List of Asian tornadoes and tornado outbreaks
  - 2013 Brahmanbaria tornado, another tornado in the Dhaka area
