= Daulatpur, Manikganj =

Town in Daulatpur Upazila of Manikganj district

Daulatpur
- Location in Bangladesh
- Coordinates: 23°56′N 89°49′E
- Country: Bangladesh
- Division: Dhaka Division
- District: Manikganj District
- Time zone: UTC+6 (Bangladesh Time)

Daulatpur is a town in Daulatpur Upazila of Manikganj District in the Dhaka Division of central Bangladesh. The town is best known for being hit by the deadliest tornado in world history, the Daulatpur–Saturia tornado, which killed roughly 1,300 people.
