= Machail Mata =

- Durga Mata/ Chitto Mata/ Machail Mata
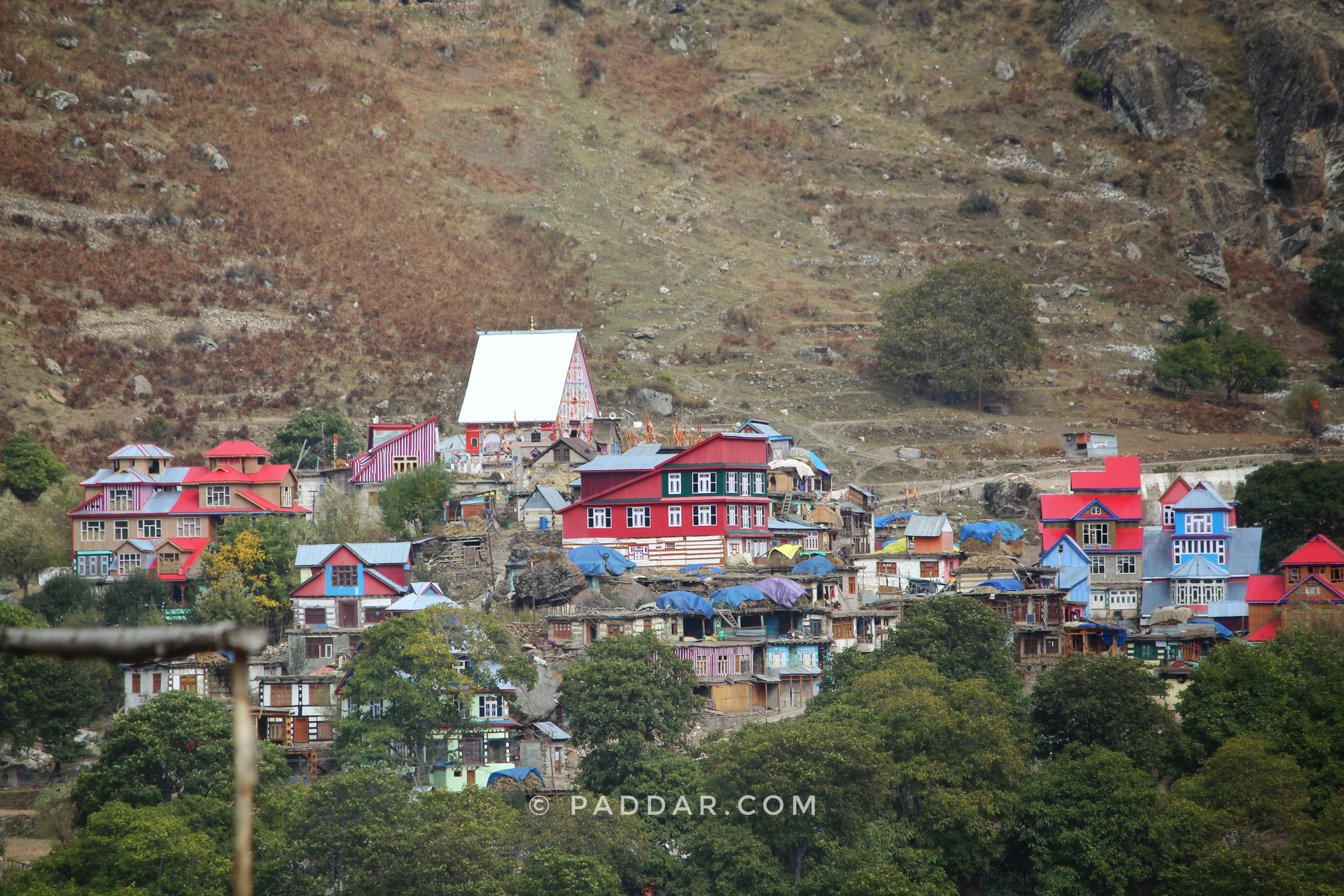
- Machail Temple Shrine

- Location within Jammu and Kashmir Location within India

Religion
- Affiliation: Hinduism
- Deity: Chandi
- Status: Open

Location
- Location: Kishtwar, Jammu and Kashmir
- Country: India
- Interactive map of Machail Mata
- Coordinates: 33°25′2.49″N 76°20′40.19″E

Architecture
- Type: Hindu architecture
- Style: Pahari

Machail Chandi Mata Temple, popularly known as Machail Mata, is a shrine to Chandi, a form of the Hindu goddess Durga, in the village of Machail in Paddar, Kishtwar district of jammu Kashmir Thousands of pilgrims, mainly from the Jammu region, visit the shrine every August.

== History ==
The shrine was visited in 1981 by Thakur Kulveer Singh of Bhaderwah, Jammu region. From 1987 onwards, Thakur Kulveer SIngh started 'Chhadi Yatra' (holy mace) when thousands of people visit the shrine every year during 'Chhadi Yatra', which starts from Chinote in Bhaderwah to Machail in Paddar.

== Location and operations ==
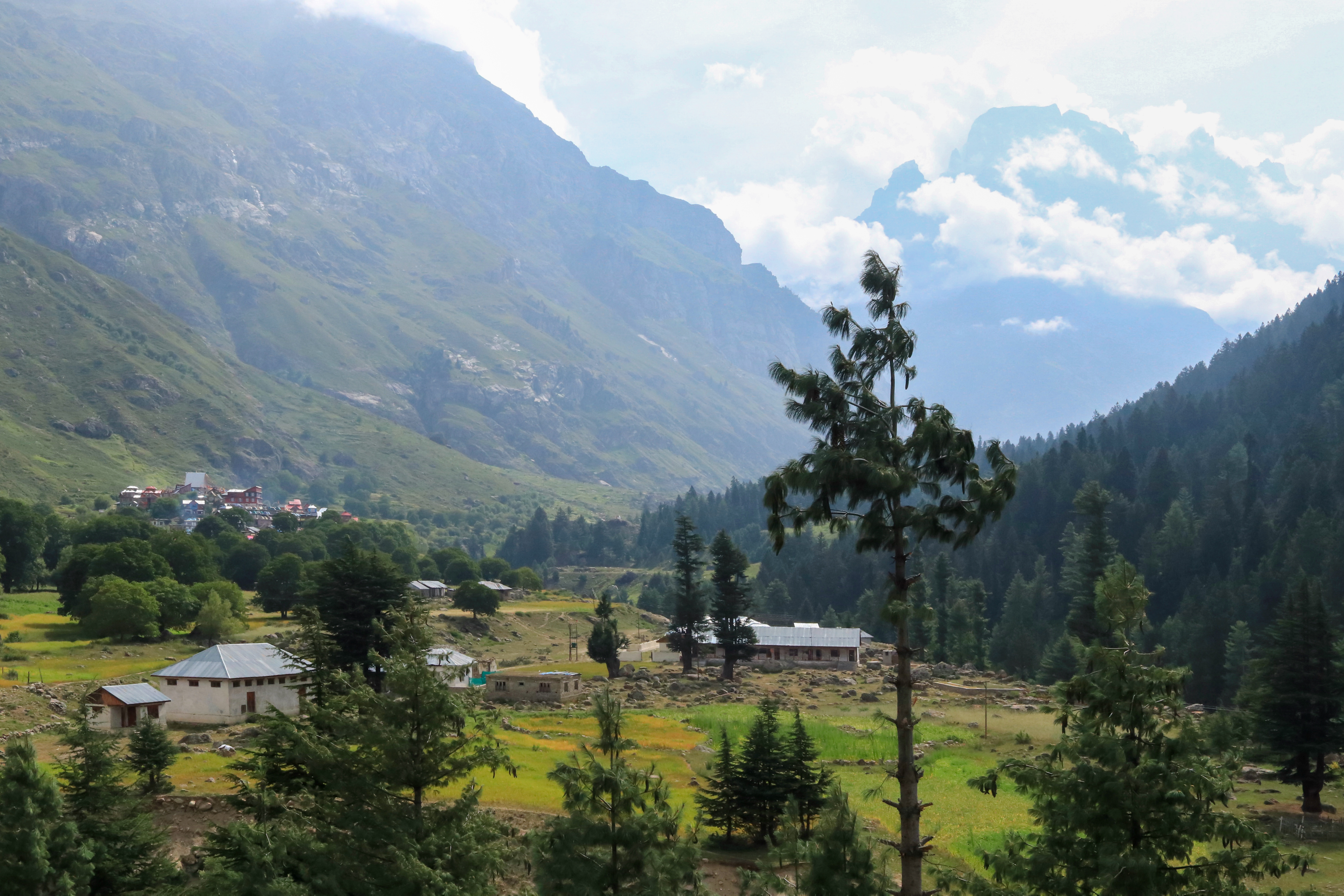
The Machail valley with the village and temple in the distance on the left

Machail is a small village at an altitude of 2800m in the Padder Valley of Kishtwar district in Jammu region, 290 km from Jammu city and 66 km from Kishtwar. Usually, people take two days to reach the shrine by foot. On the way there are villages where they can spend the night.

The shrine is inaccessible during the winter months of December, January and February. The temple reopens in April of each year with the Baisakhi festival. During the festival, the temple's idol is returned to the shrine after being kept in a priest's home over the winter.

It is near a tributary of the Chenab River.

== Annual pilgrimage ==
An annual 43-day-long pilgrimage to the temple is held each year from late July to early September. In 2023, nearly 2 lakh (200,000) people performed the pilgrimage, while in July and August 2024, more than 1.5 lakh (150,000) pilgrims visited the temple.

In 2019, the pilgrimage was suspended due to security concerns. The 2020 and 2021 pilgrimages were not held due to the COVID-19 pandemic. The 2025 pilgrimage had a delayed start before being suspended in August following flash floods on the route, which killed at least 65 people.
