= 2025 Pakistan floods =

Floods in Pakistan

- Date: June – September 2025
- Location: Khyber Pakhtunkhwa, Sindh, Punjab, Balochistan, Pakistan and Azad Kashmir, Pakistan
- Type: Flash flood, riverine flood
- Cause: Heavy pre‑monsoon rains causing flash floods in mountainous terrain Climate change
- Participants: Rescue 1122, NDMA, Alkhidmat Foundation, paramilitary forces, district administration and NGOs
- Deaths: 1,037+
- Injuries: 1,067+
- Missing: 209+
- Property damage: $150 million

The 2025 Pakistan floods were a series of devastating floods triggered by heavy pre-monsoon rains in June 2025 and continuing throughout the monsoon season into September. The disaster primarily affected Khyber Pakhtunkhwa, Punjab, Sindh, Balochistan and Azad Kashmir, causing widespread casualties, infrastructure damage, and mass displacement. The Swat Valley and large parts of Punjab were among the worst-hit areas.

As of 17 September 2025, over 1,000 people had been killed and over 1 million were affected nationwide. By 10 September, another spell of monsoon raised the numbers to 4.225 million affected, 1.8 million displaced, and another 46 killed. The NDMA, provincial governments, the Pakistan Armed Forces, and various NGOs launched large-scale rescue and relief operations in response.

Since the unilateral suspension of IWT on 23 April 2025, India used diplomatic channels to inform Pakistan of the floods instead of the Permanent Indus Commission as stated in the treaty.

== Background ==
Heavy and flash flooding in northern Khyber Pakhtunkhwa is a recurring annual calamity. The region experiences both monsoon-season (July–September) riverine floods and spring/summer flash floods triggered by intense localized rainfall and snow/glacial melt.

From 27 to 28 June 2025, intense rainfall upstream caused the Swat River to rise rapidly, precipitating flash floods. Numerous tourist gatherings near the riverbanks were taken aback.

Intense rainfall in Indian Punjab caused Ravi, Chenab and Sutlej to overflow which led to India releasing excess water in these rivers to Pakistani Punjab which caused floods in these rivers.

== Impact ==
Reservoirs in both Pakistan and India were near capacity, with Mangla Dam is 87% full, and Tarbela Dam is at 100% capacity. In India, Bhakra Dam is 90% full, Pong Dam is 99% full, and Thein Dam is 97% full.

=== Khyber Pakhtunkhwa ===
==== Northern Khyber Pakhtunkhwa floods ====
Flash floods killed at least 32 people. In 48 hours, 19 deaths (6 men, 5 women, 8 children) occurred in KP, including 13 in Swat. The victims included 18 members of the same extended family, a tourist group, of whom 12 bodies were recovered. Other provincial rain-related deaths included 2 in Charsadda and 1 in Shangla, raising the death toll. Rescue 1122, along with drones and boats, conducted extensive efforts in Swat, Malakand, and Shangla, rescuing dozens and searching intensively for missing persons two days after the floods.

Damages include 56 houses (50 partially, 6 destroyed) in various districts, including Swat, Abbottabad, Charsadda, Malakand, Shangla, Lower Dir, and Torghar. Widespread landslides and flash floods also damaged roads and disrupted communities in mountainous regions.

Punjab Information Minister Azma Bukhari slammed KP's handling of recovered bodies, stating that transporting them in garbage dumpers was "deeply disrespectful." She, along with the Punjab Assembly, called for CM Gandapur's moral resignation. Federal Information Minister Attaullah Tarar described the incident as a "governance failure," questioning why stronger leadership actions weren't taken; KP Governor Faisal Karim Kundi echoed calls for Gandapur's resignation due to this "shameful failure". Social media footage of stranded tourists pleading for rescue stirred public anger over the absence of helicopters and the delayed response. While some defended limitations of KP's resources, others pointed out that the absence of provincial helicopters caused critical delays. Four senior Swat officials: Deputy Commissioner (DC) of Swat, Rescue 1122's district head, Zahidullah Khan, Tehsil Municipal Officer (TMO) of Khawazakhela and Assistant Commissioner (AC) Babuzai were suspended. Compensation of Rs 1.5 million announced for each victim’s family. Chief Secretary of Khyber Pakhtunkhwa Shahab Ali Shah acknowledged a '45‑minute window' to act and termed the response lapse as turning a "small mistake into a major tragedy." Following the tragedy, KP authorities imposed a complete ban on riverbed mining and launched a crackdown on illegal hotels, resorts, and other encroachments along the Swat River. A three-member committee led by the Assistant Commissioner of Bahrain was established to identify and remove structures violating the KP River Protection Act (2014).

==== 2025 Khyber Pakhtunkhwa flash floods ====
By late August unprecedented floods had affected the entire province with the Buner District worst hit due to flash floods between 14 and 15 August, Buner alone recorded 228 deaths out of the 504 provincial total and 200 missing. A government helicopter involved in search and rescue operation crashed on 15 August due to bad weather, killing all 5 people on board. The flooding caused widespread casualties, extensive property damage, and severely disrupted rescue operations across several districts including Buner, Swat and Bajaur.

Rescue operations were hampered by washed-out roads, communication breakdowns, and adverse weather. KP's Rescue 1122 services, provincial disaster authorities, and local communities are engaged in evacuations and relief delivery, though challenges continue. In Mansehra’s mountainous areas, 1,300 tourists were evacuated from rain-stricken zones. Swat District was also flooded: over 2,000 residents and tourists were moved to higher ground as the Swat River and other streams surged.

KPK Chief Minister Ali Amin Gandapur announced a day of mourning, with flags at half-mast. Prime Minister Shehbaz Sharif ordered comprehensive flood relief operations, mobilizing federal and provincial resources to assist affected communities.

===== Casualties =====
At least 1,037 people were killed, including 500 in Khyber Pakhtunkhwa and 304 in Punjab, and 1,067 others were injured. Buner District was the epicenter – a state of emergency was declared there after flash floods inundated the Pir Baba area, where at least 90 people perished. In Bajaur, at least 21 people were killed, with four houses destroyed. Battagram and Shangla suffered deadly lightning-triggered floods, with dozens of fatalities. 18 family members were swept away by raging floods when they went near the river for selfies and a flash flood soon followed at least 10 people died with 4 recovered and 4 missing.

On 15 August, a Mil Mi-17 operated by the Government of Khyber Pakhtunkhwa crashed in bad weather while carrying relief goods to rain-affected areas of Bajaur District, killing all five people on board. The aircraft lost contact while en route over Mohmand District. A day of mourning was announced.

===== Affected areas =====
According to NDMA, at least 2521 buildings were damaged, including 701 completely destroyed, across multiple districts in Khyber Pakhtunkhwa such as Swat, Abbottabad, Charsadda, Malakand, Shangla, Lower Dir, and Torghar. Over 437 kilometres of roads and 52 bridges swept away during flash floods. Widespread landslides and flash floods also damaged roads, bridges, and communication networks, particularly in mountainous regions, isolating several communities.

The floods struck dozens of mountainous districts in KP. The worst-affected areas were in northern and central KP, including Buner (Pir Baba and Daggar), Bajaur (especially the Salarzai Tehsil), Battagram, Mansehra, Shangla, Lower Dir, Swat, and Abbottabad Districts also reported significant fatalities, injuries, and property damage. Buner emerged as the most severely affected district in terms of casualties and property damage. Local officials confirmed 158 fatalities in Buner alone, marking the highest death toll in the province.

=== Punjab ===
On 20 August 2025, the province of Punjab, Pakistan, along with three rivers, experienced the most severe floods since the 1988 Punjab floods. Triggered by unusually intense monsoon rains, and cross-border dam water releases resulting from reservoirs reaching full capacity, the floods devastated large areas, particularly along the Ravi, Sutlej, and Chenab rivers.

India’s opening of dam gates in Jammu and Kashmir after reservoirs reached full capacity caused sudden downstream surges, prompting emergency flood alerts and evacuations in Punjab, Pakistan. Record floods in Ravi, Sutlej and Chenab after water releases by India and monsoon rains have impacted at least 4.7 million people. Multiple breaches had to be done to protect the Qadirabad, Suleimanki and Khanki headworks from flood flows of up to one million cusecs. Ravi river whose water had been diverted to India as part of the Indus Waters Treaty and which had greatly shrank from its original size, received unprecedented flood flows submerging many settlements built on the river bed, submerging even parts of Lahore.

The floods claimed over 300 lives, in various districts of Punjab. According to NDMA, displacement exceeded 4.7 million people in Punjab with nearly 2.8 million evacuated. The numbers were later significantly reduced to about 150,000 displaced and 2.7 million evacuated. Provincial casualties stood at 300 dead and 661 injured according to NDMA. A total of 238 houses were damaged with 4 completely destroyed.

CM Maryam Nawaz Sharif ordered a major rescue operation, deploying army units across seven districts: Lahore, Narowal, Kasur, Sialkot, Okara, Faisalabad, and Sargodha. All provincial resources were mobilized. Emergency measures included hospital preparedness, evacuation of residents and livestock, and relief coordination with Rescue 1122 and PDMA. Over 300 pilgrims were rescued by the Rescue 1122 and the Armed forces, the water levels reached heights of up to 10-12 feet but were largely removed once the flood waters receded. Over 150,000 to 210,000 people were evacuated proactively following Indian flood alerts and domestic forecasting.

Gurdwara Darbar Sahib Kartarpur, a Sikh temple, was inundated following overflow of the Ravi river, flood waters reached heights of 10–12 feet. The pilgrims were rescued by a collective effort of the Rescue 1122 and Armed Forces. The water was soon removed once the river levels subsided with restoration work underway. Kartarpur Sahib, a major Sikh pilgrimage site in Narowal, saw its ground floor flooded. Punjab, considered the breadbasket of Pakistan lost over 2.2 million hectares of farmland.

Over 2.2 million hectares of agricultural land were submerged in flood waters wiping out harvests and increasing food prices across the country. 8,400 villages were inundated and livestock swept away. Punjab also had a significant amount of road network swept away, including a portion of the M-5 motorway (Pakistan) connecting Sukkur and Multan near Jalalpur Pirwala.

=== Sindh ===
Intense rainfall across much of the province submerged vast areas. Karachi received up to 163mm of rain in a single day the highest since 1979, this triggered urban flooding and much of the traffic came to a standstill, with many having to spend the entire night on road. Electricity infrastructure was also hit with many feeders tripping as a result of the rain. 10 people were killed as a result of the urban flooding due to multiple reasons.

A total of 80 deaths and 87 were injured according to NDMA with 224 houses fully and 57 partially destroyed.

All 4 rivers of Punjab are joined at Panjnad Headworks and then with the Indus River which then heads towards Sindh at Guddu Barrage.

According to PDMA, over 180,000 are affected by floods in Sindh.

=== Balochistan ===
Floods have killed 30 and injured 5 in Balochistan. A total of 3006 houses have been fully destroyed while 2080 partially destroyed according to the NDMA.

=== Azad Kashmir ===
38 people died by flooding in Azad Kashmir. 2078 houses were fully and 339 were partially destroyed as a result of the floods, according to the NDMA.

=== Gilgit-Baltistan ===
In Gilgit-Baltistan 41 people died due to floods and 481 houses were fully and 779 partially destroyed according to the NDMA.

== Impact ==
The 2025 monsoon floods in Pakistan caused widespread devastation across multiple provinces. According to the World Health Organization (WHO) Health Emergency Situation Report #8 (6 September 2025), 910 people were reported dead and 1,044 injured due to the flooding.

An estimated 5.8 million people were affected, with large-scale displacement reported, according to the International Medical Corps. Many families were forced to leave their homes, seeking shelter in temporary relief camps.

The floods caused significant infrastructure damage. WHO reported that 120 health facilities were damaged, 239 bridges were destroyed, and 671 km of roads were rendered impassable, disrupting emergency services and humanitarian aid delivery.

== Humanitarian aid and response ==
International and national agencies mobilized to provide emergency relief. The European Union pledged Rs350 million in aid, alongside contributions from various NGOs and humanitarian organizations. Efforts focused on providing food, clean water, medical care, and temporary shelter, while authorities coordinated recovery and rehabilitation plans.

== Rescue and response ==
=== Emergency operations ===
KP's Rescue 1122 deployed approximately 120 personnel across eight locations in Swat to rescue dozens, though officials acknowledged significant operational shortcomings during the initial response. An emergency flood control room was also established in Peshawar on the directives of Chief Minister Ali Amin Gandapur.

In July, approximately 1,594 people were rescued nationwide during flood-related emergencies. By late August and into September, the Pakistan Armed Forces played a central role in rescue operations conducting mass evacuations, airlifting supplies, deploying drones, and setting up relief camps in Punjab, Sindh, and Khyber Pakhtunkhwa.

=== International ===
Although Pakistan did not issue a formal appeal for international assistance, several governments and organizations delivered emergency support:

==== International Organizations ====
- United Nations released US$600,000 in emergency funds, while the International Federation of Red Cross and Red Crescent Societies launched a CHF 17 million appeal alongside the Pakistan Red Crescent Society.
- Welthungerhilfe committed €500,000 (≈ US $550,000) to provide food, hygiene kits, seeds, and infrastructure repairs.
- Caritas Pakistan provided aid including food and hygiene kits to 17,500 people and set up 15 medical camps.

==== Countries ====
- United Kingdom pledged £3.4 million (≈ US $4.2 million) for humanitarian preparedness in Sindh.
- China announced a US$6 million grant to rebuild homes in Balochistan.
- United States via CENTCOM, delivered life-saving supplies on C-17 aircraft and coordinated disaster response with the NDMA.

== Criticism ==
=== From federal and Punjab provincial governments ===
- Punjab Information Minister Azma Bukhari slammed KP's handling of recovered bodies, stating that transporting them in garbage dumpers was "deeply disrespectful." She, along with the Punjab Assembly, called for CM Gandapur's moral resignation.
- Federal Information Minister Attaullah Tarar described the incident as a "governance failure," questioning why stronger leadership actions were not taken; KP Governor Faisal Karim Kundi echoed calls for Gandapur's resignation due to this "shameful failure".

=== From public and activists ===
- Social media footage of stranded tourists pleading for rescue stirred public anger over the absence of helicopters and the delayed response.
- While some defended limitations of KP's resources, others pointed out that the absence of provincial helicopters caused critical delays.

== Aftermath ==
=== Government accountability ===
Four senior Swat officials: Deputy Commissioner (DC) of Swat, Rescue 1122's district head, Zahidullah Khan, Tehsil Municipal Officer (TMO) of Khawazakhela and Assistant Commissioner (AC) Babuzai were suspended. Compensation of Rs 1.5 million announced for each victim's family. Chief Secretary of Khyber Pakhtunkhwa Shahab Ali Shah acknowledged a '45‑minute window' to act and termed the response lapse as turning a "small mistake into a major tragedy."

=== Crackdown on encroachment ===
Following the tragedy, KP authorities imposed a complete ban on riverbed mining and launched a crackdown on illegal hotels, resorts, and other encroachments along the Swat River.

A three-member committee led by the Assistant Commissioner of Behrain was established to identify and remove structures violating the KP River Protection Act (2014).

=== Relief without responsibility ===
The unresolved mystery of lack of accountability where we have seen Park View Society in Lahore, expanding to Ravi bed but yet the Punjab Government does not seems to take measures to control or give relief to its tax payer residents. Albeit, the owner of the society has compensated to certain extent.

== See also ==
- 2025 Khyber Pakhtunkhwa flash floods
- Weather of 2025
- 2025 Kishtwar district flash flood, nearby weather event in India around the same time
- River and Flooding Live Updates Pakistan
