= 2025 Uttarakhand flash flood =

Fatal flooding in India

- The state of Uttarakhand within India
- Date: 5 August 2025
- Location: Uttarkashi, Uttarakhand, India
- Cause: Cloudburst or glacial lake outburst flood or glacier collapse or landslide
- Deaths: 5+ 50 - 100+ missing
- Property damage: Several houses and hotels

The 2025 Uttarakhand flash flood occurred on 5 August 2025 in Uttarkashi, Uttarakhand, India. The disaster killed at least five people and left more than 100 others missing.

== Cause ==
The cause of the event is still investigated. Media initially reported a cloudburst as the trigger for the disaster, but scientists are now exploring the possibility that a glacial lake outburst flood (GLOF), a glacier collapse, a landslide, or a combination of those different events may have caused the Kheer Ganga river to overflow with immense force. The floodwaters, carrying a large amount of debris and mud, tore through the Dharali village and surrounding areas. The India Meteorological Department (IMD) had previously issued a warning for heavy rainfall in the region until 10 August.

== Casualties and damage ==
The debris flow caused widespread destruction, particularly in the Dharali village (31°02′27″N 78°46′52″E), which lies on the pilgrim route to Gangotri Dham. Initial reports confirmed five fatalities, with many more people feared missing. More than 70 people were presumed dead as of 14 August. The Indian Army said injured individuals are receiving medical treatment at the Indian Army medical facility in Harsil. Locals estimate that hundreds of people could possibly be trapped under the debris. Dramatic visuals from the scene showed houses, shops, and other infrastructure being crushed and obliterated by periodic waves of boulders and mud. The Dharali market was submerged, causing a fear of several casualties. Preliminary assessments suggest that at least 50 hotels were destroyed and around 40–50 houses were swept away. A portion of the Harsil Army camp and helipad was damaged by debris flow. Eleven soldiers were reported to be among the missing.

== Rescue operations ==
Upon receiving news of the disaster, the Indian Army's Ibex brigade, along with teams from the National Disaster Response Force (NDRF) and State Disaster Response Force (SDRF), were immediately mobilized and dispatched to the affected areas. The Uttarkashi district magistrate confirmed that rescue teams are currently assessing the extent of the damage and are engaged in search and rescue operations. Uttarkashi police have urged residents and tourists to stay away from the swollen rivers. Chief Minister Pushkar Singh Dhami was in contact with senior officials to monitor the situation and oversee relief efforts. Dhami said 190 people were successfully rescued.

Two Boeing CH-47 Chinooks, two Mil Mi-17s, an Aérospatiale SA 315B Lama and a HAL Dhruv of the Indian Air Force were placed on standby as poor weather hampered rescue operations.

By late August 2025, the Air Force, from its Northern Secor, deployed five of its Mi-17 helicopters along with a Chinook and C-130J transport aircraft each for the flood relief operations following the Uttarakhand and Kishtwar district flash floods. The C-130J aircraft boarded by an NDRF team reached Jammu to supply rescue materials, supplies and trained personnel. So far, 50 Army personnel, 21 BSF personnel and over 40 civilians have been rescued by the fleet from regions including Akhnoor, Pathankot and Dera Baba Nanak. Additionally, over 750 kg of relief materials were also air dropped into Pathankot as part of the operation. Additional helicopters and transport aircraft also remained on standby to join the operations if deemed necessary.

== Aftermath ==
The uttarakhand flash flood and cloudburst had a significant impact on the region's infrastructure and travel. The disaster led to the disruption of connectivity to Gangotri Dham, and the Char Dham Yatra was impacted by rain-triggered landslides and flash floods. The IMD's forecast for continued heavy rainfall raised concerns about the potential for further emergencies. The events in Uttarakhand and other parts of the Himalayan region, such as Jammu and Kashmir, have highlighted the devastating effects of extreme weather, and officials are maintaining round-the-clock vigilance in vulnerable zones. Residents in the affected areas were in a state of shock, with many families displaced and businesses in ruins. A second cloud burst struck Sukhi Top near Dharali shortly after the first. The extent of the damage is currently being assessed.

== Geological and hydrological impact ==
A temporary lake approximately 400-500 m long formed upstream in Harsil, raising fears of further flooding if the natural dam were to breach. The IMD issued warnings of continued heavy rainfall through mid-August.

== Reactions ==
=== Domestic reactions ===
- Government of India Union Home Minister Amit Shah spoke with Uttarakhand Chief Minister Pushkar Singh Dhami to take stock of the situation. Shah assured all necessary assistance and dispatched seven rescue teams, including three teams from the Indo-Tibetan Border Police (ITBP) and four from the National Disaster Response Force (NDRF). Prime Minister Narendra Modi also expressed his condolences to those affected and stated that relief and rescue teams were making every possible effort to help the people.
- Uttarakhand's Chief Minister Pushkar Singh Dhami described the news of the losses as "extremely sad and painful." He confirmed that the State Disaster Response Force (SDRF), NDRF, district administration, and other teams were engaged in relief and rescue operations on a "war footing." Dhami stated he was in constant contact with senior officials to monitor the situation and ensure that help reached those affected.
- The Indian Army's Surya Command, specifically the "Ibex Brigade," was among the first responders. Troops were immediately mobilized to the affected area in Dharali village to assess the situation and undertake rescue operations. The Army stated it was "resolute in support of our citizens during this natural calamity."
- In September 2025, Prime Minister Narendra Modi is scheduled to visit flood-affected regions in Uttarakhand and other northern Indian states to review the situation. According to government sources cited by news agencies, he will meet the respective Chief Ministers and senior officials to assess the conditions on the ground.

== Timeline ==
- 5 August 2025 – Flash flood devastates Dharali; initial casualties and missing persons reported.
- 6-8 August 2025 – Rescue operations intensify; causes begin to be investigated.
- 12 August 2025 – Officials confirm 43 missing; warnings issued regarding ongoing rainfall and geological risks.

== See also ==
- 2025 Kishtwar district cloudburst
- List of floods
- List of deadliest floods
- Floods in India
