= Shahab Shah =

Pakistani officer and politician

Chief of Secretary of Khyber Pakhtunkhwa
- Incumbent
- Assumed office February 14, 2025
- Prime Minister: Shehbaz Sharif
- Preceded by: Nadeem Chaudhry

Additional Chief Secretary of Khyber Pakhtunkhwa
- In office 2021–2023

Personal details
- Born: Shahab Ali Shah; May 1974 (age 51) Bannu District, Pakistan
- Education: University of Peshawar

Shahab Ali Shah (born May 1974) is a BPS-21 officer of the Pakistan Administrative Service (PAS). He is the current Chief of Secretary of Khyber Pakhtunkhwa (KP), after Nadeem Chaudhry stepped down from the position. He was approved by Prime Minister Shehbaz Sharif to take over the position. He previously served as the Additional Chief Secretary for KP.

== Early life ==
Shah was born in May 1974 in the Bannu District. He began to study Political Science at the University of Peshawar.

== Officer career ==
His first posting was in the Sargodha district in 1999. In 2001, Shah was transferred from Sargodha to Jhang where he served till 2003.

== Working as Political Agent ==
Between 2008 and 2010, Shah was a political agent for the district of South Waziristan. In 2011, Shah served as political agent for the Kurram District. He was the chief economist for KP until 2014 when he was transferred again. He was the political agent for the Khyber District, for which he served until 2016. He served as the Additional Chief Secretary of KP from 2021 to 2023.

=== Appointment for Chief of Secretary for KP ===
Shah was appointed as the Chief of Secretary for KP on February 14, 2025. This was after the previous Chief, Nadeem Chaudhry, stepped down for the position. He was approved as the chief by the Prime Minister of Pakistan.
