= Nor'westers =

Severe storms in Eastern India and Bangladesh

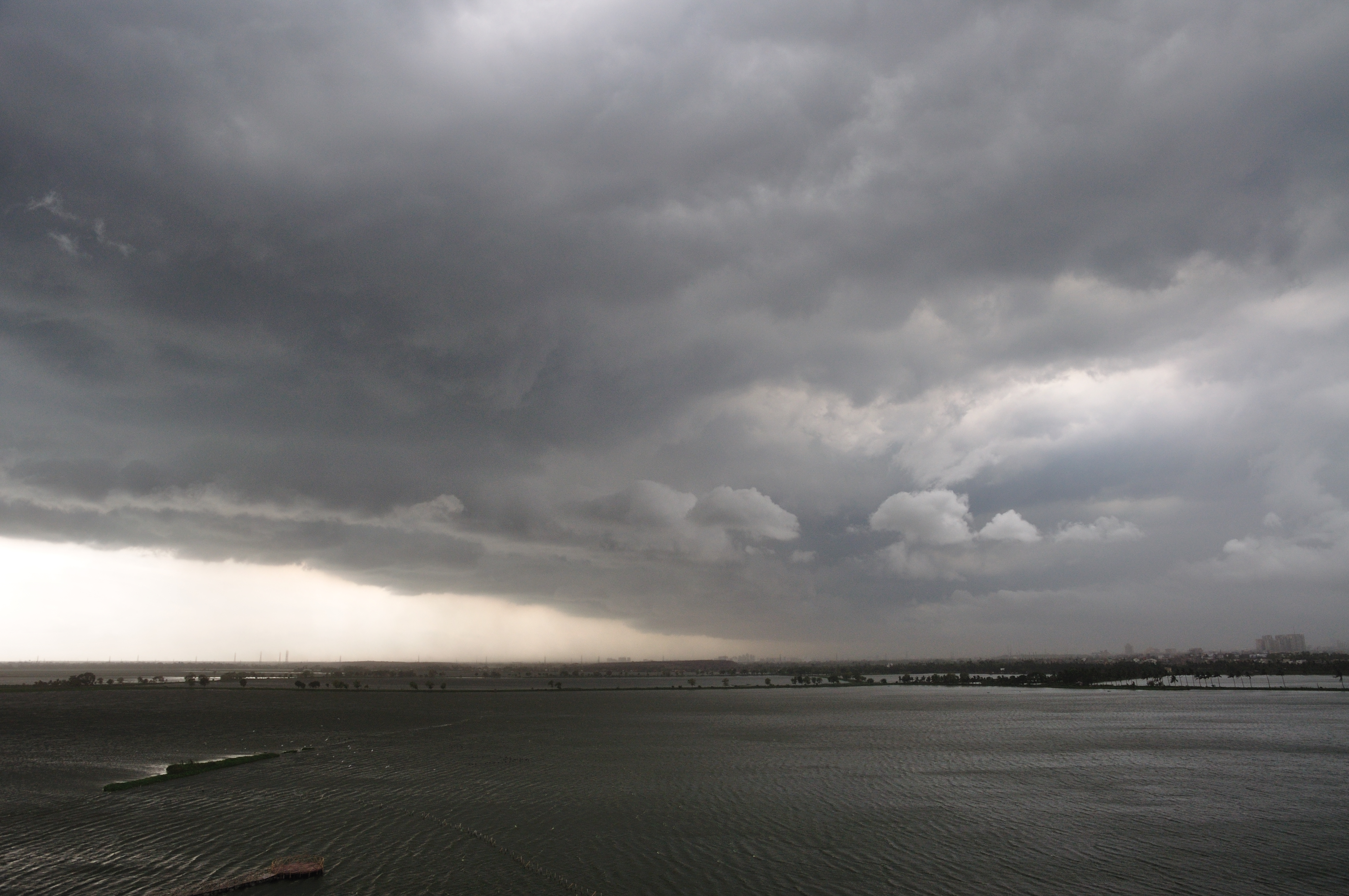
Nor'wester in Kolkata, India, 2010

The Nor'westers are a localised rainfall and thunderstorm event which occurs in the region of Eastern South Asia. This includes the region of Bengal (Bangladesh and West Bengal) and the regions of Odisha, Tripura, Assam, Bihar, Jharkhand in East India and Northeast India and the adjacent regions of Nepal during the summer months. These storms generally occur in the afternoon or just before sunset, when thick dark black clouds start appearing over the sky and then bring gale-speed wind with torrential rain, often with hail, but spanning only a short period of time.

== Etymology ==
They are also known as kalboisakhi or kalbaisakhi (Bengali: কালবৈশাখী, romanized: Kālbôiśākhī, pronounced [kaːlboiʃakʰi]; Odia: କାଳ ବୈଶାଖୀ, romanized: Kāḷa Baiśākhī, pronounced [kaɭɔ̟ bɔ̟isakʰi]), and as bordoisila (Assamese: বৰদৈচিলা, romanized: Bôrdôisilā, pronounced [bɔ̞ɹdo̞isilä]).

In these languages, the term kālbôiśākhī refers to a "fateful thing" which occurs in the Hindu month of Baishakh. The term nor'wester is more commonly used in English newspapers since these storms travel from northwest to southeast. In Assamese, the event is known as a bôrdôisilā, which is derived from the Bodo word bôrdôisikhlā, in which bôr means wind, dôi means water and sikhlā means girl, represents the goddess of nature, wind and rain and also marks the beginning of the Assamese month Bôhāg or Baishagu.

== Genesis ==
Heavy hailstorm during a nor'wester in Thakurgaon, Northern Bangladesh (April 2022)

The period of kalboisakhi formation generally begins in April and lasts until the monsoon establishes itself over Northeast India, although March kalboisakhi are not unknown. Based on event descriptions and the meteorological environments involved, these storms can be classified as progressive derechos. kalboisakhi originate over the Chhotanagpur Plateau between the states of Bihar and Jharkhand. They gradually gain strength as they move southeastwards and impact the states of Odisha, West Bengal, and Assam with gale-speed winds (often exceeding 100 km/h (62 mph)), torrential rains, and hailstorms. On some occasions, incursion of moist air in these elevated places, when combined with high surface temperatures, causes violent thunderstorms. Tornadoes also rarely form if there is enough moisture, convection and heat in the Ganges-Brahmaputra Delta; one such tornado killed over a thousand people when it struck Bangladesh in 1989, making it the deadliest tornado in history.

== Effects ==
Kalboisakhi brings destruction by uprooting trees due to gale winds and waterlogging roads due to heavy rainfall. It often damages crop by hailstorms. However it is extremely helpful for kharif crops like jute, paddy, etc. and give relief after the mid-day heat and give rainfall to the dry soils for the development of the crops. Due to global warming, these storms are becoming infrequent and becoming stronger, causing more destruction.

== In Bengali literature ==
Many Bengali poets and artists have regarded "kalboisakhi" as events of astounding beauty. Bengali poet Mohit Lal Majumder described the storm in his poem Kalboisakhi, and the storms also inspired Rabindranath Tagore's poem Esho Hey Boisakh (lit. 'Come, oh Boisakh').

== Photography ==
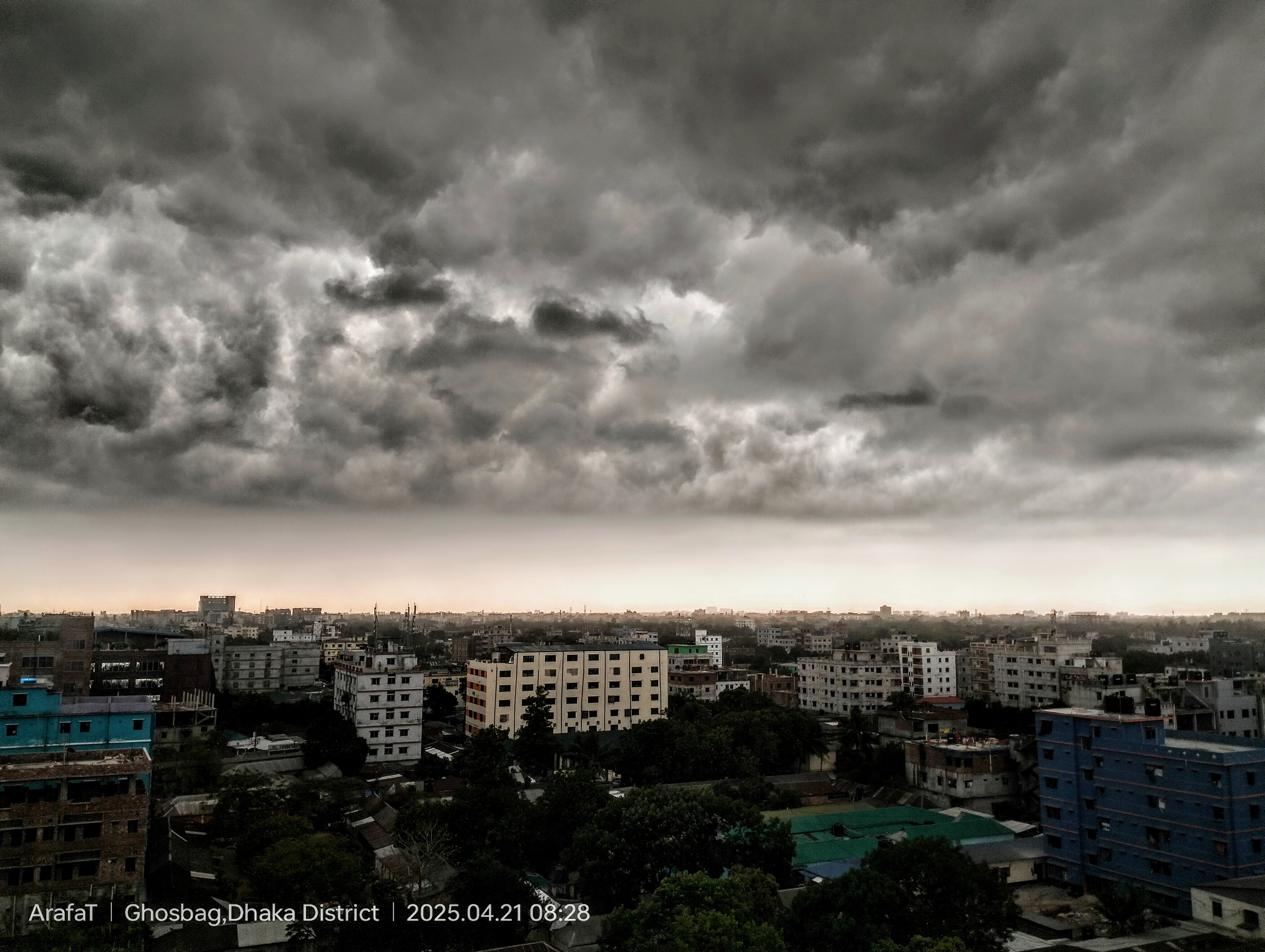
At 8:28 am on the 8th of Baishakh, 1432 (21 April 2025 CE), the moment before the month's rainfall in Bangladesh.

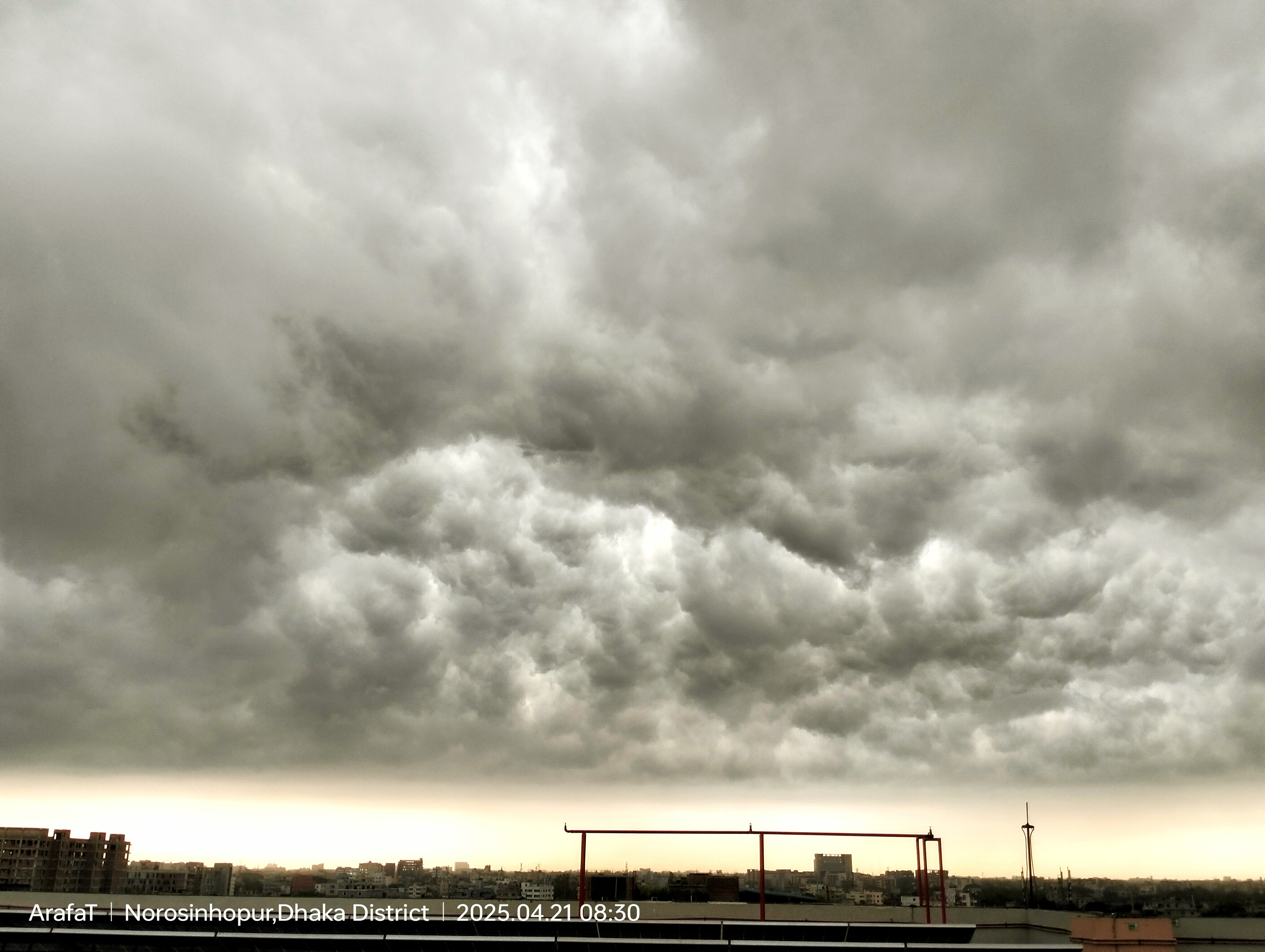
Before the rains come in the month of Baishakh in Bangladesh

== See also ==
- Mango showers – pre-monsoon summer rainfall in southern India
- Derecho
- Monsoon
- Geography of Bangladesh
- Geography of India
