= Kaliganga River =

River in Bangladesh

Coordinates: 23°44′N 90°15′E

The Kaliganga (Bengali: কালীগংগা নদী) is a river in Bangladesh that runs for 78 kilometres (48 mi). The Kaliganga branches off from the Brahmaputra River and flows to the south. In recent years, the amount of water extracted for irrigation has much reduced its size outside of the rainy season.

In April 2025 residents in Manikganj Municipality formed a human chain to press for their demand of construction of a bridge over the Kaliganga at Kusherchar to ensure smooth communication for the area's residents.
