= 1996 Bangladesh tornado =

1996 tornado in Bangladesh

Meteorological history
- Formed: 13 May 1996
- Dissipated: 13 May 1996
- Duration: 20 – 30 minutes

F4 tornado
- on the Fujita scale
- Highest winds: 207 mph (333 km/h

Overall effects
- Fatalities: 600 (estimated)
- Injuries: 37,248
- Areas affected: Tangail, Jamalpur. Sirajganj
- Houses destroyed: 36,420
- Part of the Tornadoes of 1996

The 1996 Bangladesh tornado was a deadly and destructive tornado that struck 80 - 90 villages in north-central Bangladesh on May 13 1996, leaving more than 600 fatalities with over 37,248 injured, and 36,420 houses were extensively damaged within 20 minutes of its arrival at 125 mi/h. The tornado arrived through Jamalpur, Sirajganj and Tangail districts that affected numerous families across the villages, 100,000 people went homeless and more than 6,787 livestock were killed. Initial reports cited between 400 and 443 dead with 32,000 injured. Before the tornado arrived, locals witnessed heavy hailstones across the affected areas. Strong winds lifted several people away, and one person was blown and dropped 1.5 kilometers away at 28 mph. It also uprooted trees and damaged the houses completely, mostly mudbrick-huts built by the villagers on the banks of river.

== Background ==
Bangladesh is one of the most vulnerable countries in the world to various natural disasters, including frequent occurrences of cyclones, storm surges, tornadoes, tornado outbreaks, devastating floods and maritime disasters. Due to its frequent climate changes, it is recognized as the eighth vulnerable country in the history of world natural disaster. On May 13, 1996, a tornado originated in north central of the country through Jamalpur, Sirajganj and Tangail districts of Dhaka. Due to its immense speed and 20 minutes of large destruction, it was declared the deadliest tornado, affecting the 90 villages of the country in forty years of Bangladesh's history. Several people died due to disease infection, head injuries, lack of sanitary countermeasures and emergency assistance. The New York Times described "tree branches transformed into missiles by the 125 mile-per-hour winds".

== Emergency response ==
The survivors accused the administration for not providing timely assistance, leading to count more tolls. Despite being a hotspot of tornadoes, disaster response was never exercised in 1990s. People claimed that authorities left several survivors alone in an attempt to search for the missing bodies and arrange their burial preparations. NGOs and neighboring people were actively involved in emergency assistance and the victims where possible, received disaster relief from the Bangladesh Red Crescent Society and government agencies. The International Federation of Red Cross and Red Crescent Societies (IFRC) was also providing medical assistance and dispatching relief materials to the tornado victims.
