= 2013 Brahmanbaria tornado =

Extreme weather event in Bangladesh

- The thin tornado as it tracked through the Brahmanbaria district

Meteorological history
- Formed: 22 March 2013 16:50
- Dissipated: 22 March 2013 17:10
- Duration: 15–20 minutes

F2 tornado
- on the Fujita scale
- Highest winds: 198 km/h (123 mph)

Overall effects
- Fatalities: 36
- Injuries: 388
- Damage: $20 million (2013 USD), 1.55 million BDT (2013 BDT)
- Areas affected: Brahmanbaria District
- Part of the Tornadoes of 2013

In the evening hours of March 22, 2013, a destructive F2 tornado touched down in Brahmanbaria District, Bangladesh at 16:50 local time. The tornado affected at least 25 villages within 20 minutes, causing extensive damage to agricultural land and destroying over 1,700 homes. At least 36 people were killed and 388 injured, primarily due to poor building construction practices and the absence of an early warning system.

== Meteorological history ==
The tornado formed at 16:50 local time. According to local residents, at 17:00, rain and a hailstorm occurred. It traveled east of its starting point in Ramrail, and then changed direction to the southeast, before changing to an easternly direction and dissipating at Ahmedabad. It traveled a total of 12 to 15 km (7.5 to 9.3 mi).

It passed over bodies of water and became a waterspout, sending volumes of water into the air. Fishes at a nearby pond were picked up and deposited across the area. The water level in the pond reportedly fell by a foot. Moving through a marsh, the tornado also deposited large amounts of clay across the field. Many houses were destroyed and trees uprooted during the event, while residents heard a "strange noise" for many minutes. Intense lightning activity was interpreted from reports of a red fiery glow in the sky.

There were no meteorological stations in the vicinity of the tornado, hence many scientific parameters cannot be determined. According to government officials however, the travel speed of the tornado is thought to be up to 70 km/h (43 mph). According to the Bangladesh Meteorological Department, the tornado was assigned an F2 rating on the Fujita scale with wind speeds of 198 km/h (123 mph) (written as 55 m/s (180 ft/s)). Field surveys indicate the average radius of the tornado ranged from 60 to 80 m (200 to 260 ft). At its maximum, the tornado was 100 to 150 m (330 to 490 ft) wide. A 17 km^{2} (6.6 sq mi) area was affected by strong tornadic winds, with a 1 km^{2} (0.39 sq mi) area suffering extreme damage. It was reported that total damage and 90% of the recorded fatalities occurred in this area.

== Impact ==
On its 12–15-kilometre (7.5–9.3 mi) track from Ramrail to Ahmedabad, the narrow but strong and deadly tornado also struck 20 other villages. 8,615 people were significantly affected. At least 36 deaths and 388 injuries were recorded. A government figure stated that 1,778 homes were completely destroyed while 744 were partially destroyed. Some 1,731 families across eight unions in Brahmanbaria were affected.

Numerous homes, most of which were small and of frail construction, were completely destroyed, though a few well-built structures sustained major damage as well. Debris was scattered in all directions, and homes that were hit ranged from lightweight metal shacks, to small masonry homes. Several people were killed after being picked up and thrown by the tornado, and two of the fatalities were a woman and her baby, tossed 250 yards from their home. The woman was pronounced dead while her child was transported to the Dhaka Medical College and Hospital, where she died later that evening. The body of another woman was found near a latrine, and three relatives of one survivor were among the fatalities. The partial collapse of a district jailhouse resulted in the death of a guard, but all the other occupants survived.

Several thousand trees were uprooted or snapped by the tornado, while utility poles and lines suffered major damage. Some 300 livestock and 900 poultry were killed by the tornado as well. Farm fields were scoured by the tornado, and over 1,200 acres of agricultural land used to grow rice and vegetables were either destroyed or damaged. Several hundred to thousand public facilities like tube wells and latrines were left unsuitable for use. One man was also fatally electrocuted on his rooftop while attempting to survey the damage.

== Aftermath ==
About 100 people were immediately transported to medical centers for their injuries. The initial death toll was reported at 10. Displaced residents took refuge at school facilities while the local government established makeshift tents in the affected villages. The local government provided each surviving family with 15 kg of rice, corrugated sheet metal, as well as 9,000 Bangladeshi takas (Tk) within 20 hours of the disaster. Relatives of the dead were compensated Tk 20,000. Individuals whose homes were damaged were provided Tk 6,000 to rebuild, and Tk 5,000 was given to those who were injured.

== Gallery ==
Aftermath

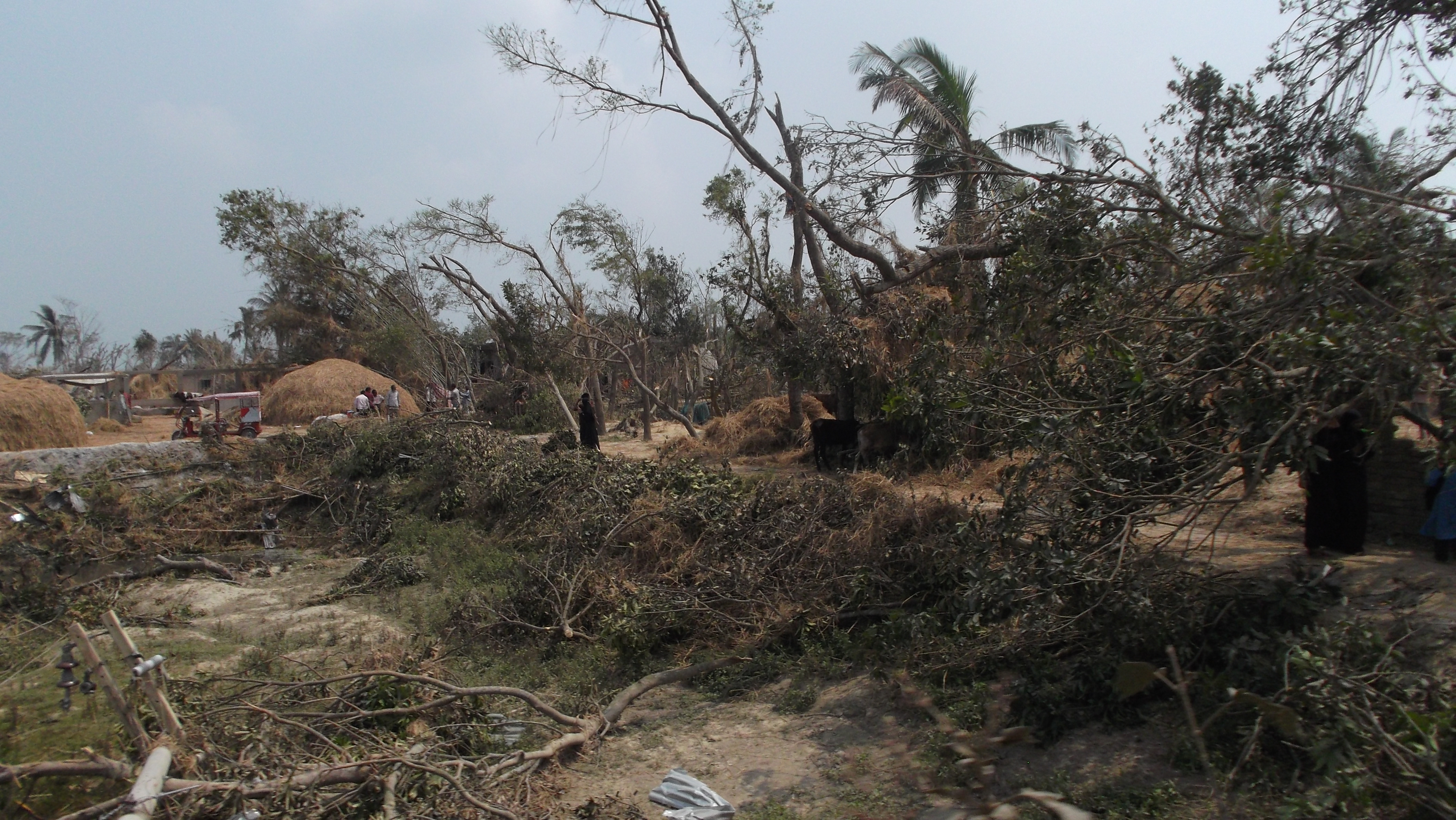
Toppled trees and electrical poles.

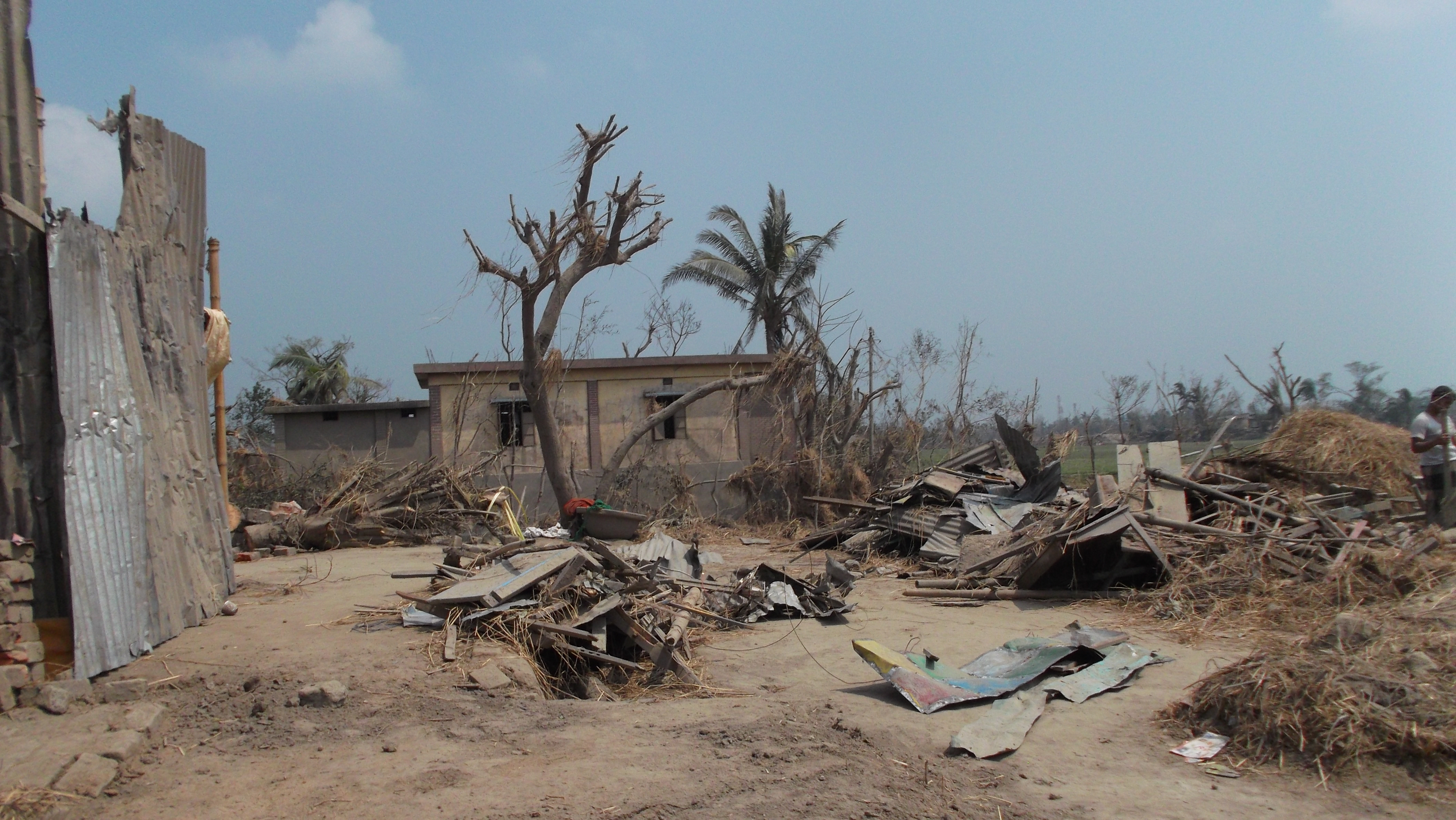
Damage to homes.

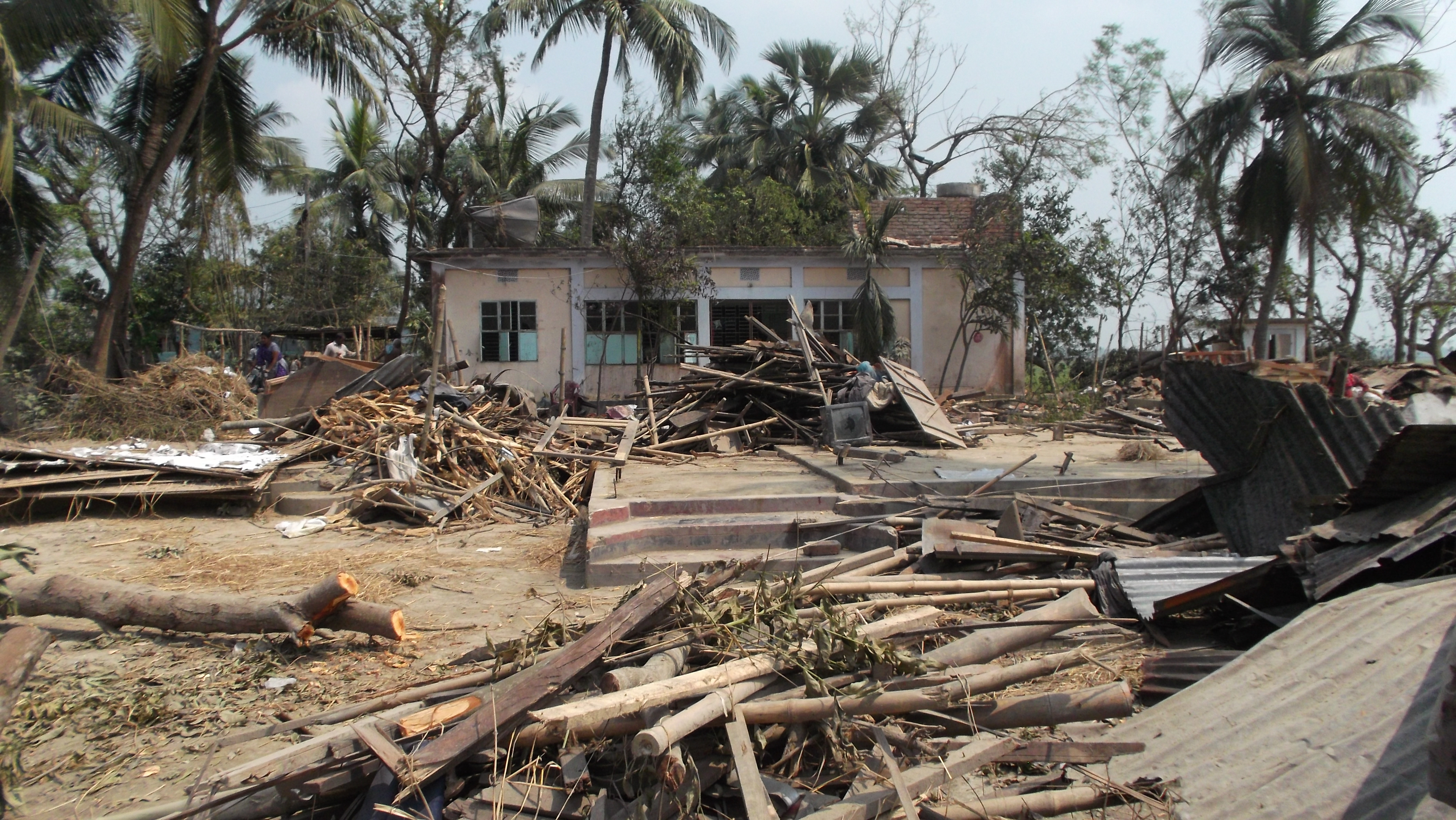
Debris strewn across the ground.

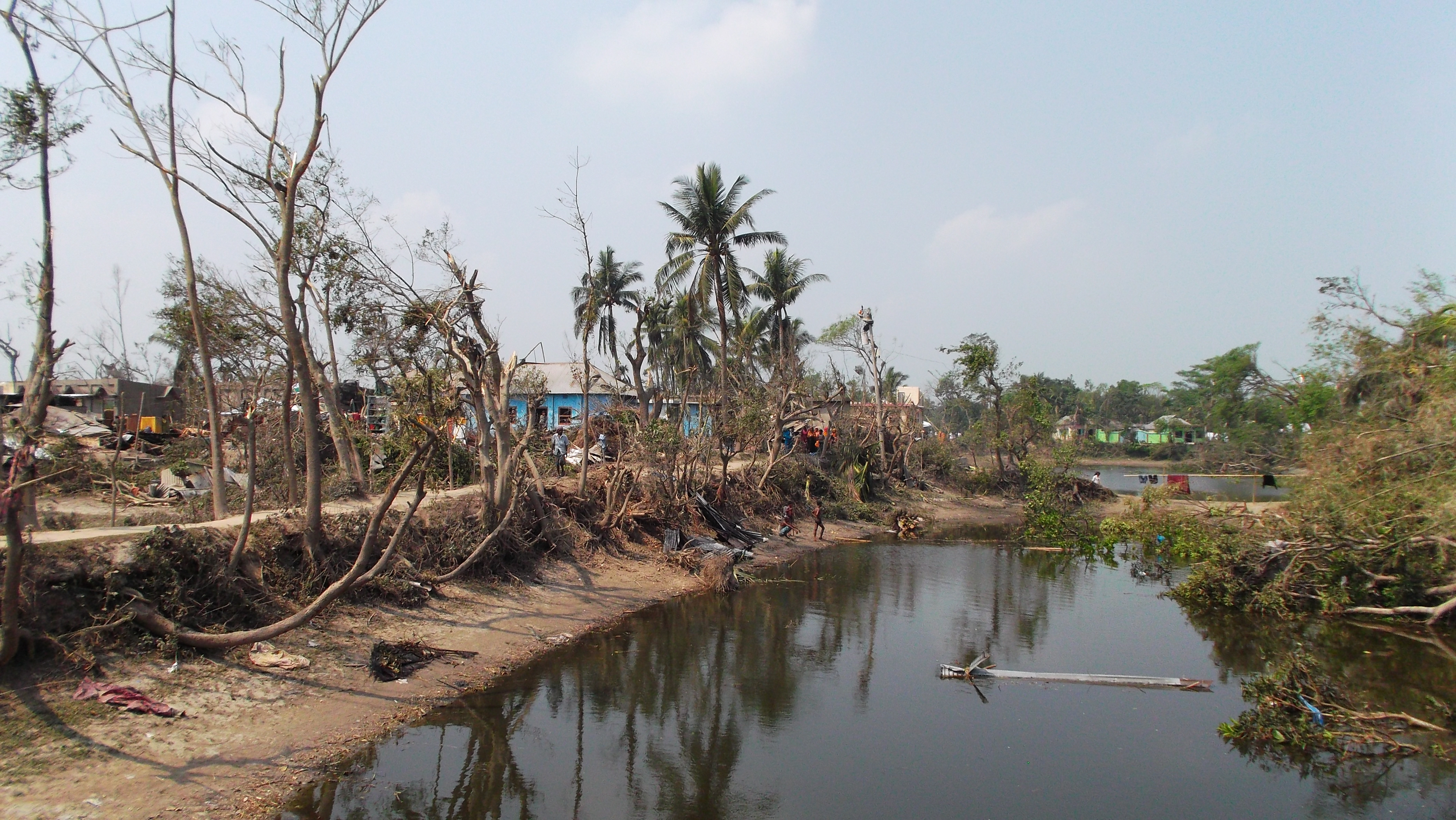
Damage near two ponds.

== See also ==
- Tornadoes of 2013
