= 2025 Kishtwar district flash flood =

Cloudburst and flash flood disaster in Jammu and Kashmir, India

- Date: 14 August 2025
- Time: 11:30 (IST)
- Location: Chositi village, Kishtwar, Jammu and Kashmir, India
- Type: Flash flood
- Cause: Cloudburst
- Deaths: 68
- Injuries: 300+
- Missing: 36

On 14 August 2025, a flash flood occurred in Chositi (also spelled Chashoti), a village in the Kishtwar district of India-administered Jammu and Kashmir, as the result of a cloudburst. The incident caused 68 deaths, 300 injuries, and left at least 38 people missing. In addition to residents, pilgrims on the Machail Mata Yatra pilgrimage route were also impacted.

== Background ==
Chositi is located in a remote region in Kishtwar district. It is the last village accessible to motor vehicles on the Machail Mata Yatra pilgrimage route, which ends at the Machail Mata temple about 8 kilometers (5 miles) away. The pilgrimage had begun on 26 July, and was scheduled to end on 5 September.

== Incident ==
On 14 August 2025, a cloudburst struck Chositi, triggering flash floods along the Machail Mata Yatra route at about 11:30 a.m. local time. At least 1,200 people were at the spot when the cloudburst occurred.

The floods buried some houses in mud and swept away others. A community kitchen for the pilgrims, which had about 200 people present at the time of the floods, was also swept away. A security camp and multiple vehicles at a bus stop were also washed away. Over 500 people are believed to have been trapped.

The cloudburst generated flash floods that reached areas downstream, where at least seven bodies were recovered far from the main site.

== Casualties ==
An National Disaster Response Force official confirmed 68 fatalities, including two personnel from the Central Industrial Security Force (CISF), and 38 missing person reports. As of August 15, 21 bodies have been identified. At least 300 people were rescued and transported to hospitals, including 50 with severe injuries. Local NGO Ababeel reported that its teams were among the first responders on the ground, providing ambulances and medical support.

== Response ==
Rescue operations were launched by the State Disaster Response Force (SDRF), National Disaster Response Force (NDRF), local police, the Indian Army, and volunteers. More than 30 ambulances, including those from Ababeel (NGO), were deployed to evacuate and treat the injured. The Air Force has helicopters on standby in Udhampur for rescue operations, but has been hindered by continued cloudy weather.

Union Minister Jitendra Singh stated that the administration had "immediately swung into action" and that damage assessment and medical arrangements were underway. Lieutenant Governor Manoj Sinha monitored relief operations. Prime Minister Narendra Modi expressed condolences and assured "every possible assistance" to those affected via a post on X.

By late August 2025, the Air Force, from its Northern Secor, deployed five of its Mi-17 helicopters along with a Chinook and C-130J transport aircraft each for the flood relief operations following the Uttarakhand and Kishtwar district flash floods. The C-130J aircraft boarded by an NDRF team reached Jammu to supply rescue materials, supplies and trained personnel. So far, 50 Army personnel, 21 BSF personnel and over 40 civilians have been rescued by the fleet from regions including Akhnoor, Pathankot and Dera Baba Nanak. Additionally, over 750 kg of relief materials were also air dropped into Pathankot as part of the operation. Additional helicopters and transport aircraft also remained on standby to join the operations if deemed necessary.

Union Home Minister Amit Shah announced that the Government of India promptly released ₹209 crore as the Central share to Jammu and Kashmir under the State Disaster Response Fund (SDRF). The allocation enabled immediate relief measures in the aftermath of the flash floods and landslides caused by cloudbursts and heavy rains.

== Impacts ==
The Jammu and Kashmir administration cancelled all cultural programmes for the 15 August Independence Day celebrations. Chief Minister Omar Abdullah also cancelled the traditional "At Home" tea party scheduled for the evening, while formal events such as the speech and march past were held as planned.

The Machail Mata pilgrimage was suspended in the aftermaths of the floods.

== See also ==
- 2025 Uttarakhand flash flood
- 2025 Pakistan floods, nearby weather event in Pakistan around the same time
