= Cloudburst =

Short and very intense rain

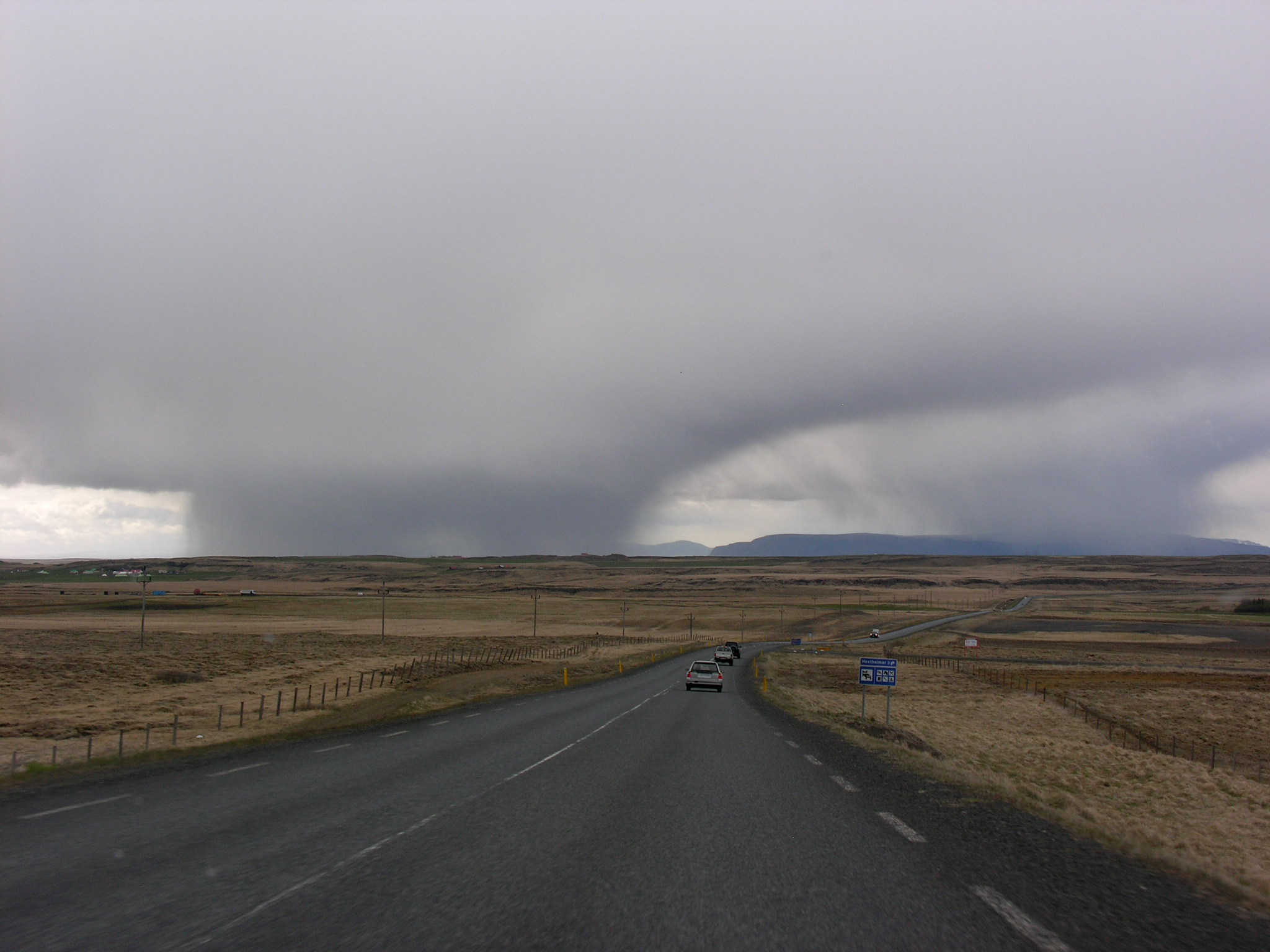
Cloudburst in Iceland

A cloudburst is a large amount of precipitation in a very short period of time, sometimes accompanied by hail and thunder. Cloudbursts can dump enormous amounts of water in less than 5 minutes; for example - 25 mm of precipitation falling on one square kilometre, corresponding to 25,000 metric tons of water. This readily generates flood conditions.

Cloudbursts are infrequent as they occur only via orographic lift or occasionally when a warm air parcel mixes with cooler air, resulting in sudden condensation. At times, a large amount of runoff from higher elevations is mistakenly conflated with a cloudburst. The term "cloudburst" arose from the notion that clouds were akin to water balloons and could burst, resulting in rapid precipitation. Though this idea has since been disproven, the term remains in use.

== Properties ==
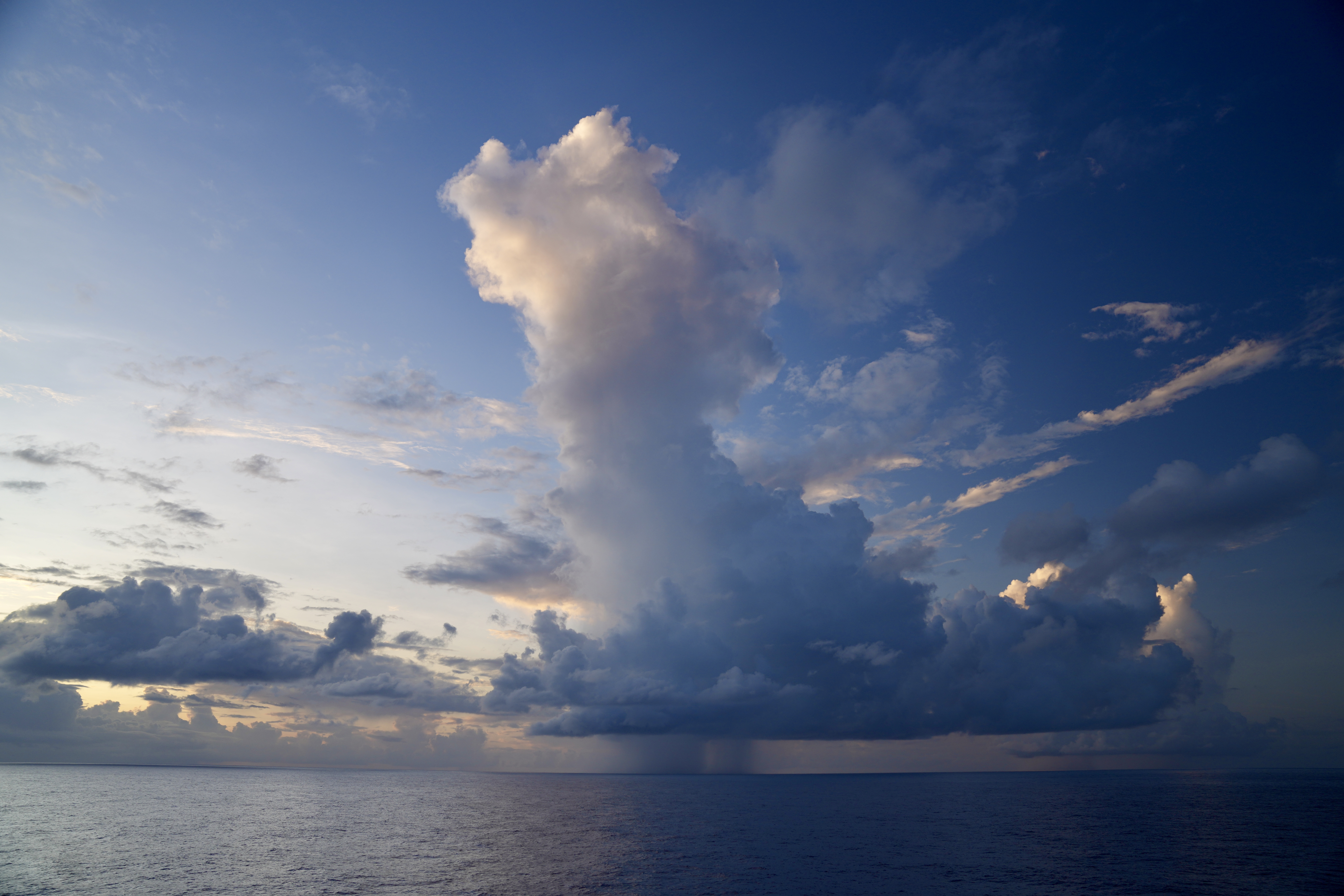
Intense localized precipitation from a cumulonimbus cloud

Specific definitions of a cloudburst vary. In India the definition is rainfall with a rate equal to or greater than 100 millimetres (3.9 in) per hour, while the Swedish weather service SMHI defines the corresponding Swedish term "skyfall" as 1 millimetre (0.039 in) per minute for short bursts and 50 millimetres (2.0 in) per hour for longer rainfalls. The associated convective cloud can extend up to a height of 15 kilometres (9.3 mi) above the ground.

During a cloudburst, more than 20 millimetres (0.79 in) of rain may fall in a few minutes. The results of cloudbursts can be disastrous and can be responsible for flash flood creation.

Rapid precipitation from cumulonimbus clouds is possible due to the Langmuir precipitation process in which large droplets can grow rapidly by coagulating with smaller droplets which fall down slowly. It is not essential that cloudbursts occur only when a cloud clashes with a solid body like a mountain, they can also occur when hot water vapor mingles into the cold resulting in sudden condensation.

== Detection and forecasting ==
While satellites are extensively useful in detecting large-scale weather systems and rainfall, the resolution of the precipitation from these satellites are usually worse than the area of cloudbursts, and hence they go undetected. Weather forecast models also face a similar challenge in simulating the clouds at a high resolution. Detailed forecasting of rainfall in hilly regions remains difficult due to the uncertainties in the interaction between the moisture convergence and the hilly terrain, the cloud microphysics, and the heating-cooling mechanisms at different atmospheric levels.

== Record cloudbursts ==
Duration	Rainfall	Location	Date
1 minute	38.10 millimetres (1.5 in)	Basse-Terre, Guadeloupe	26 November 1970
5 minutes	66.29 millimetres (2.61 in)	Hoed Spruit, South Africa	29 November 1911
15 minutes	198.12 millimetres (7.8 in)	Plumb Point, Jamaica	12 May 1916
20 minutes	205.74 millimetres (8.1 in)	Curtea de Argeș, Romania	7 July 1947
42 minutes	304.80 millimetres (12.0 in)	Holt, Missouri, United States	22 June 1947
1 hour	380 millimetres (15.0 in)	Smethport, Pennsylvania, United States	July 18, 1942
2 hours	490 millimetres (19.3 in)	Yujiawanzi, Inner Mongolia, China	July 19, 1975
6 hours	830 millimetres (32.7 in)	Linzhuang, Henan, China	August 7, 1975
12 hours	1,144 millimetres (45.03 in)	Foc-Foc, La Réunion	January 8, 1966
24 hours	1,870 millimetres (73.62 in)	Cilaos, La Réunion	March 16, 1952

== Locations ==
=== Asia ===
In the Indian subcontinent, a cloudburst usually occurs when a monsoon cloud drifts northwards, from the Bay of Bengal or Arabian Sea across the plains, then onto the Himalayas and bursts, bringing rainfall as high as 75 millimetres per hour.

==== Bangladesh ====
- On September 14, 2004 341 millimetres (13.4 in) mm of rain was recorded in Dhaka in 24 hours.
- On June 11, 2007 425 millimetres (16.7 in) mm of rain fell in 24 hours in Chittagong.
- On July 29, 2009, a record breaking 333 millimetres (13.1 in) of rain was recorded in Dhaka, in 24 hours, previously 326 millimetres (12.8 in) of rain was recorded on July 13, 1956.
- On September 27, 2020, record breaking 433 millimetres (17.0 in) of rain fell just in 12 hours in the city of Rangpur in Northern Bangladesh, producing widespread flooding across the city.

==== India ====
- On September 28, 1908 – A cloudburst resulted in a flood where level of the Musi River increased up to 3.4 meters . About 15,000 people died and around 80,000 houses were destroyed along the banks of the river.
- On July 20, 1970, the Alaknanda valley witnessed a major flood, This was attributed to a cloudburst on the night of 20 July 1970 on the southern mountain front in the Alaknanda valley (between Joshimath and Chamoli). According to an estimate, floods transported about 15.9 × 10^{6} tonnes of sediment within a day. The catastrophe was so large that it wiped out the leftover of the 1894 Gohna lake. In addition, a roadside settlement between Pipalkoti and Helong called Belakuchi in the Alaknanda valley was washed away along with a convoy of 30 buses, by the roaring Alaknanda River. However, around 400 pilgrims route to Badrinath, were saved due to the alertness of a police constable who guided them to run uphill. Alaknanda River in Uttarakhand and its entire river basin, from Hanumanchatti near the pilgrimage town of Badrinath to Haridwar was affected.
- On August 15, 1997, 115 people were killed when a cloudburst occurred and trail of death was all that was left behind in Chirgaon in Shimla district, Himachal Pradesh.
- On August 17, 1998, a massive landslide following heavy rain and a cloudburst at Malpa village killed 250 people, including 60 Kailash Mansarovar pilgrims in Kali valley of the Pithoragarh district, Uttarakhand. Among the dead was Odissi dancer Protima Bedi.
- On July 16, 2003, about 40 people were killed in flash floods caused by a cloudburst at Shilagarh in Gursa area of Kullu district, Himachal Pradesh.
- On July 6, 2004, at least 17 people were killed and 28 injured when three vehicles were swept into the Alaknanda River by heavy landslides triggered by a cloudburst that left nearly 5,000 pilgrims stranded near Badrinath shrine area in Chamoli district, Uttarakhand.
- On 26 July 2005, a cloudburst caused approximately 950 millimetres (37 in) of rainfall in Mumbai. over a span of eight to ten hours; the deluge completely paralysed India's largest city and financial centre, leaving over 1,000 dead. Half of the flooding was caused due to the blockage sewers in many parts of Mumbai.
- On August 14, 2007, 52 people were confirmed dead when a severe cloudburst occurred in Bhavi village in Ganvi, Himachal Pradesh.
- On August 7, 2009, 38 people were killed in a landslide resulting from a cloudburst in Nachni area near Munsiyari in Pithoragarh district of Uttarakhand.
- On August 6, 2010, in Leh, a series of cloudbursts left over 1,000 people dead (updated number) and over 400 injured in the frontier Leh town of Ladakh region.
- On September 15, 2010, a cloudburst in Almora in Uttarakhand submerged two villages, one of them being Balta, in which save for a few people, the entire village drowned. Almora was declared as a town suffering from the brunt of cloudburst by the Uttarakhand authorities.
- On September 29, 2010, a cloudburst in NDA (National Defence Academy), Khadakwasla, Pune, in Maharashtra left many injured and hundreds of vehicles and buildings damaged due to the consequent flash flood.
- Again on October 4, 2010, a cloudburst in Pashan, Pune, in Maharashtra left 4 dead, many injured and hundreds of vehicles and buildings damaged; the record books registered the highest rainfall in intensity and quantity in Pune city, then about 118 years old (record of 149.1 mm in 24 hours) of October 24, 1892. In the history of IT hub Pune, for the first time this flash flood forced locals to remain in their vehicles, offices and what ever available shelter in the accompanying traffic jam.
- On October 4, 2010, a cloudburst in Pashan, Pune may have been the world's first predicted cloudburst. Since 2:30 pm weather scientist Kirankumar Johare in the city frantically sent out SMSs to the higher authorities warning of an impending cloudburst over the Pashan area. Even after taking the necessary precautions, 4 people died including one young scientist.
- On June 9, 2011, near Jammu, a cloudburst left four people dead and over several injured in Doda-Batote highway, 135 km from Jammu. Two restaurants and many shops were washed away
- On 20 July 2011, a cloudburst in upper Manali, 18 km from Manali town in Himachal Pradesh state left 2 dead and 22 missing.
- On September 15, 2011, a cloudburst was reported in the Palam area of the National Capital Territory of Delhi. The Indira Gandhi International Airport's Terminal-3 was flooded with water at the arrival due to the immense downpour. Even though no deaths occurred, the hours-long rainfall was enough to enter the record books as the highest rainfall in the city since 1959.
- On September 14, 2013, there was a cloudburst in Ukhimath in the Rudraprayag district, Uttarakhand killing 39 people.
- On June 15, 2013, a cloudburst was reported in Kedarnath and Rambara region of Rudraprayag district, Uttarakhand. Over 1,000 killed to date, it is feared that the death toll may rise to 5,000. Debris is still being cleared and thousands are still missing as of June 30, 2013. It left approximately 84,000 people stranded for several days. The Indian Army and its Central Command launched one of the largest and most extensive human rescue missions in its history. Spread over 40,000 square kilometres, 45 helicopters were deployed to rescue the stranded. According to a news report this incident was falsely linked with cloud burst, rather it was caused due to disturbance in the two glaciers near Kedarnath.
- On July 30, 2014, a landslide occurred in the small Indian village of Malin, located in Ambegaon taluka in Pune district of India. The landslide, which hit the village early in the morning while its residents were asleep, killed at least 20 people. In addition to those dead, over 160 people were believed to have been buried in the landslide in 44 separate houses, though more recent estimates place the figure at about seventy
- On July 31, 2014, a cloudburst was reported in Tehri Garhwal district of Uttarakhand. At least 4 people were reported dead.
- On September 6, 2014, there was a cloudburst in Kashmir Valley killing more than 200 people. Center for Science and Environment (CSE) mentioned heavy and unchecked development aggravated the development in the region. Over 1,84,000 people were rescued after heavy rains have large part of the State submerged.
- On December 2, 2015, the city of Chennai recorded 494 mm rains eventually causing 2015 South India floods. The floods saw 400+ casualties around Tamil Nadu.
- On May 8, 2016, Continuous rainfall occurred in Tharali and Karnaprayag in Chamoli district, Uttarakhand resulting in damage, but no casualties.
- On the night of July 5, 2017 a cloudburst was reported in Haridwar, Uttarakhand. Some local stations recorded 102 mm rain in an hour. Surprisingly no one was killed and no significant damage occurred.
- On July 20, 2017, a cloudburst caused huge damage at Thathri town of Doda district killing more than 6 people.
- On May 4, 2018, a cloudburst had occurred above Belagavi, Karnataka. Weather stations in the area reported 95mm rain in an hour. No significant casualties or damage had occurred.
- On May 12, 2021, a cloudburst was reported from Tehri, Chamoli districts in Uttarakhand. No significant casualties or damage had occurred.
- On July 28, 2021, Cloudburst hits Hunzar hamlet in Dachhan area of Kishtwar district resulting into death of 26 persons and 17 injured.
- On October 20, 2021, a cloudburst occurred above Pethanaickenpalayam town of Salem district, Tamil Nadu. This resulted in 213 mm rain in a single day. Ponds in the area filled up and so did the Thennakudipalayam lake. The Vasishta Nadi became flooded, making the Attur check dam to brim with water. No damages were reported.
- On 8 July 2022, Cloudburst occurred at Pahalgam en route to Amarnath cave shrine.
- On December 18, 2023, the District of Thoothukudi recorded 946 mm and District of Tirunelveli Tirunelveli recorded 636 mm rains eventually causing 2023 Tamilnadu floods. The floods saw 400+ casualties around Southern districts of Tamil Nadu.Many places of Thoothukudi district Tiruchendur, Sathankulam, Srivaikuntam recorded more than 700 mm rain in 24 hrs . This is the Highest rain fall occurred in plain region without any cyclone formation.
- On 31 July 2024, Flash floods and cloudbursts have caused huge damage in several areas of Uttarakhand.
- On 5 August 2025, a cloudburst occurred in the upper catchment area of the Kheer Ganga river in the Uttarkashi district of Uttarakhand
- On 14 August 2025, a cloudburst in Chishoti village of Kishtwar district, Jammu & Kashmir, triggered a flash flood that swept away pilgrim camps, houses, and bridges, killing at least 60 people and injuring over 100. Rescue operations by the Army, NDRF, and local volunteers saved dozens, though many remained missing.

==== Pakistan ====
- On July 1, 1977, the city of Karachi was flooded when 207 millimetres (8.1 in) of rain was recorded in 24 hours.
- On July 23, 2001 620 millimetres (24 in) of rainfall was recorded in 10 hours in Islamabad. It was the heaviest rainfall in 24 hours in Islamabad and at any locality in Pakistan during the past 100 years.
- On July 23, 2001 335 millimetres (13.2 in) of rainfall was recorded in 10 hours in Rawalpindi.
- On July 18, 2009, 245 millimetres (9.6 in) of rainfall occurred in just 4 hours in Karachi, which caused massive flooding in the metropolis city.
- On July 29, 2010, a record breaking 280 millimetres (11 in) of rain was recorded in Risalpur in 24 hours.
- On July 29, 2010, a record breaking 274 millimetres (10.8 in) of rain was recorded in Peshawar in 24 hours.
- On August 9, 2011 176 millimetres (6.9 in) of rainfall was recorded in 3 hours in Islamabad flooded main streets.
- On August 10, 2011, a record breaking 291 millimetres (11.5 in) of rainfall was recorded in 24 hours in Mithi, Sindh Pakistan.
- On August 11, 2011, a record breaking 350 millimetres (14 in) of rainfall was recorded in 24 hours in Tando Ghulam Ali, Sindh Pakistan.
- On September 7, 2011, a record breaking 312 millimetres (12.3 in) of rainfall was recorded in 24 hours in Diplo, Sindh Pakistan.
- On September 9, 2012, Jacobabad received the heaviest rainfall in the last 100 years, and recorded 380 millimetres (15 in) in 24 hours, as a result over 150 houses collapsed.
- On July 28, 2021, cloudbursts caused flooding in several areas of Islamabad.
- On August 15, 2025, cloudbursts caused flooding in several areas of Khyber Pakhtunkhwa including Buner, Shangla, Bajaur and Swat. It killed almost 300 people and destroyed hundreds of houses and schools.

=== Europe ===
==== Denmark ====
- On 2 July 2011, a cloudburst hit parts of Zealand and the Greater Copenhagen area of Denmark. This resulted in the greatest recorded rainfall in 24 hours in the past 55 years. It caused an estimated DKK 6 billion in damage, notably including structural failures at the 17th-century fortress, Kastellet.

=== North America ===
==== Colorado Piedmont ====
- The uplands adjacent to the Front Range of Colorado and the streams which drain the Front Range are subject to occasional cloudbursts and flash floods. This weather pattern is associated with upslope winds bringing moisture northwestward from the Gulf of Mexico.

== See also ==
- Guerrilla rainstorm
- Flash flood
- Flood
- Mudflow
- Rain
- Sleet (disambiguation)
- Storm
- Thunderstorm
