= List of local winds =

Names given to winds local to specific regions

This is a list of names given to winds local to specific regions.

== Africa ==
- Berg wind, a seasonal katabatic wind blowing down the Great Escarpment from the high central plateau to the coast in South Africa.
- Cape Doctor, often persistent and dry south-easterly wind that blows on the South African coast from spring to late summer (September to March in the southern hemisphere).
- Haboob, a sandstorm's fast moving wind which causes cold temperature over the area from where it passes. It mainly passes through Sudan.
- Harmattan, a dry wind that blows from the northeast, bringing dust from the Sahara south toward the Gulf of Guinea.
- Khamsin (khamaseen in Egypt) and similar winds named Haboob in the Sudan, Aajej in southern Morocco Ghibli in Libya and Tunisia, Harmattan in the western Maghreb, Sirocco, a south wind from the Sahara and Simoom in the Arabian Peninsula.
- Tsiokantimo, a strong southerly wind affecting southwestern Madagascar. It is generally cool and dry and is associated with high-pressure systems over the southern Indian Ocean.
- Alizé, a cool, moist northerly maritime wind that affects West and Central Africa, bringing relatively humid air from the Atlantic. It is essentially a regional trade wind with a local name.
- Sirocco , a hot, dry wind originating in the Sahara and moving north across North Africa into the Mediterranean. Over the sea it often becomes warm and humid before reaching southern Europe.

== Asia ==
=== Central Asia ===
- Karaburan ("power storm") (a spring and winter katabatic wind of Central Asia)
- Khazri (cold, coastal gale-force wind of north Caspian Sea)
- Sukhovey (hot dry wind in the steppes, semi-deserts, and deserts of the Kazakhstan and the Caspian region)

=== Eastern Asia ===
- Buran (a wind which blows across eastern Asia. It is also known as Purga when over the tundra)
- Karakaze (strong cold mountain wind from Gunma Prefecture in Japan)
- East Asian Monsoon, known in China and Taiwan as meiyu (梅雨), in Korea as jangma (장마), and in Japan as tsuyu (梅雨) when advancing northwards in the spring and shurin (秋霖) when retreating southwards in autumn.
- Oroshi (颪) (strong katabatic wind across the Kanto Plain)

=== Northern Asia ===
- Barguzin wind (steady, strong wind on Lake Baikal in Russia)
- Sarma (cold strong wind at the western shore of Lake Baikal)

=== Southeast Asia ===
- Amihan (northeasterly wind across the Philippines)
- Habagat (southwesterly wind across the Philippines)

=== Southern Asia ===
- Elephanta (strong southerly or southeasterly wind on the Malabar coast of India)
- Norwester or Kalbaishakhi (local rain fall and thunder storm which occurs in India and Bangladesh)
- Kali Andhi or simply Andhi (the violent dust squalls that occur before monsoon in the northwestern parts of the Indo-Gangetic Plain region of the Indian subcontinent)
- Loo (hot wind which blows over plains of India and Pakistan.)
- Mango showers (it is accompanied by thunderstorm bringing rainfall to Karnataka, Kerala and parts of Tamil Nadu during months of March and April.)
- Pachua (Westerlies)
  - Monsoon of South Asia

=== Western Asia ===
- Gilavar (south wind in the Absheron Peninsula of the Azerbaijan Republic)
- N'aschi (northeastern wind on the Iranian coast of the Persian Gulf, and on the Makran coast)
- Rashabar (or Rashaba) ("black wind") (a strong wind in the Kurdistan Region of Iraq, particularly in Sulaimaniya)
- Shamal (a summer northwesterly wind blowing over Iraq and the Persian Gulf states)
- Sharqi (seasonal dry, dusty Middle Eastern wind coming from the south and southeast)
- Simoom (Samiel) (strong, dry, desert wind that blows in Egypt, Jordan, Syria, and the desert of Arabia)
- Wind of 120 days (a four-month-long hot and dry wind over the Sistan Basin in Iran and Afghanistan)

== The Americas ==
=== Latin America and the Caribbean ===
==== Caribbean ====
- Alisio (easterly trade wind in the Caribbean)
- Alize (northeasterly across Central America and the Caribbean)
- Bayamo (violent wind on Cuba's southern coast)
- Brisote (the northeast trade wind when it is blowing more strongly than usual, in Cuba)

==== Mexico ====
- Cordonazo, also referred to as el cordonazo de San Francisco or the Lash of St Francis (southerly hurricane winds along the west coast of Mexico)
- Coromuel (south to south-west wind in the La Paz area of the Baja California peninsula and the Gulf of California)
- Norte (strong cold northeasterly wind in Mexico)

==== Central America ====
- Papagayo (periodic wind which blows across Nicaragua and Costa Rica and out over the Gulf of Papagayo)
- Tehuantepecer, or Tehuano wind (periodic wind which blows across the Isthmus of Tehuantepec in southern Mexico and out over the Gulf of Tehuantepec)

==== South America ====
- Abrolhos (squall near the Abrolhos Islands off the coast of eastern Brazil)
- Caju (stormy gale-force north-westerly in the Atlantic coast of Brazil)
- Nordeste (moderate wind from northwest in brazilian Northeast region)
- Carpinteiro (strong southeasterly wind along the southern Atlantic coast of Brazil)
- Garua, la garúa, or garoa (dry winds hitting the lower western slopes of the Andes)
- Minuano (southern Brazil)
- Zonda wind (on the eastern slope of the Andes in Argentina)
- Pampero (Argentina and Uruguay), very strong wind that blows from the sea over the Rio de la Plata into the Pampa, generally accompanied with a thick line of squalls, with severe rains, hail and thunderstorm.
- Puelche (on the western slope of the Andes in south-central Chile)
- Sudestada, (strong offshore wind from the Southeast associated with most of the shipwrecks in Uruguay's Rio de la Plata coast)
- Williwaw (strong, violent wind occurring in the Strait of Magellan, the Aleutian Islands, and the coastal fjords of Southeast Alaska)

=== North America ===
- Alberta Clipper (fast-moving, frigid winter wind out of the central Canadian plains that swoops down across the U.S. Plains, Midwest and Great Lakes)
- Brookings Effect (off-shore wind on the southwestern Oregon coast, United States; also known as the Chetco Effect)
- Chinook (warm dry westerly off the Rocky Mountains)
- Diablo (hot, dry, offshore wind from the northeast in the San Francisco bay)
- The Hawk (cold winter wind in Chicago)
- Jarbo Gap Wind (associated with and often referred to as a Diablo Wind; katabatic winds in the Northern Sierra Nevada in the vicinity of Jarbo Gap, often contributing to the growth of local wildfires)
- Montreal Express (an arctic cold air mass that sweeps across New England sometimes as far as Massachusetts... the term seems to be regional to New England)
- Nigeq (a strong wind from the east in Greenland)
- Nor'easter (strong storm with winds from the northeast on the north eastern coast of the United States (particularly New England states) and the east coast of Canada (Atlantic Canada))
- Texas Norther (fast-moving, stormy Arctic cold front that strikes Texas in winter, dropping freezing rain or sleet, a.k.a. Blue Norther because it sometimes appears as a low, blue, dense advancing cloud)
- Piteraq (cold katabatic wind on the Greenlandic east coast)
- Santa Ana winds (dry downslope winds that affect coastal Southern California and northern Baja California)
- Santa Lucia winds (a downslope wind affecting southern San Luis Obispo and northern Santa Barbara Counties, California)
- Squamish (strong, violent wind occurring in many of the fjords of British Columbia)
- Les Suêtes (western Cape Breton Highlands) high speed southeasterly winds
- Sundowner, (strong offshore wind off the California coast)
- Washoe Zephyr (seasonal diurnal wind in parts of western Nevada)
- Williwaw (strong, violent wind occurring in the Strait of Magellan, the Aleutian Islands, and the coastal fjords of Southeast Alaska)
- Witch of November, or November Witch (strong winds blowing across the Great Lakes in autumn)
- Wreckhouse (strong downslope winds off the Long Range Mountains in south-western Newfoundland)

== Europe ==
- Aquilone (cold and usually strong northerly or northeasterly wind in Italy)
- Autan (warm, föhn-type southeasterly wind in the Mediterranean Languedoc region)
- Bise (cold, northern wind in France and northeastern wind in Switzerland)
- Böhm (cold, dry wind in Central Europe)
- Bora (northeasterly from eastern Europe to northeastern Italy and northwestern Balkans)
- Burle (north wind which blows in the winter in south-central France)
- Cers (strong, very dry northeasterly wind in the bas-Languedoc region in southern France)
- Cierzo (cool north/northwesterly wind on Ebro Valley in Spain)
- Crivăț (strong, very cold north-easterly wind in Moldavia, Dobruja, and the Bărăgan Plain parts of Romania.)
- Etesian (Greek name) or Meltem (Turkish name) (northerly across Greece and Turkey)
- Euro (a warm and usually moderate wind from Africa that reaches the Ionian coast of Italy)
- Euroclydon (a cyclonic tempestuous northeast wind in the Mediterranean)
- Föhn or foehn (a warm, dry, southerly wind off the northern side of the Alps and North Italy. The name gave rise to the fén-fēng (焚風 'burning wind') of Taiwan).
- Gregale (northeasterly from Greece)
- Halny (in northern Carpathians)
- Helm (north-easterly wind in Cumbria, England)
- Košava (strong and cold southeasterly season wind in Serbia)
- Viento de Levante or Levanter (easterly through Strait of Gibraltar)
- Leste (hot, dry, easterly wind of the Madeira and Canary Islands)
- Leveche (Spanish name for a warm southwest wind in parts of coastal Mediterranean Spain)
- Libeccio (southwesterly towards Italy)
- Llevantades (north-north-east and east-north-east on the east coast of Spain)
- Lodos (southwesterly towards Turkey. Strong "Lodos" events occur 6 to 7 times a year bringing 35 kt winds into Marmara Sea. The winds are funnelled SE from the Mediterranean and through the Dardanelles Strait.)
- Maestro (cold northerly in the Adriatic Sea)
- Marin (south-easterly from Mediterranean to France)
- Mistral (cold northerly from central France and the Alps to Mediterranean)
- Nordés (north-eastern wind in Galicia)
- Ostro (southerly wind in the Mediterranean)
- Poniente, ponente, or ponent (strong west to east wind formed by the wind tunnel effect of the Gibraltar Strait; see Levante for the opposite)
- Sirocco (southerly warm and moist wind from north Africa to southern Europe, mostly to Southern Italy and to the Balkans)
- Solano (south to south-easterly wind in the southern sector of Spain)
- Tramontane (cold northwesterly from the Pyrenees or northeasterly from the Alps to the Mediterranean, similar to Mistral)
- Vendavel (westerly through the Strait of Gibraltar)
- Murlan (cold and dry northeasterly wind in winter in Albania, Montenegro and Northwestern part of North Macedonia)
- Winds of Provence (a group of winds in the southeast France)

== Oceania ==
=== Australia ===
- Black nor'easter (violent north-easterly storm that occurs on the east coast of Australia usually between late spring and early autumn)
- Brickfielder (hot and dry wind in Southern Australia)
- Fremantle Doctor (afternoon sea breeze from the Indian Ocean which cools Perth, Western Australia during summer)
- Southeast Australian foehn (a westerly föhn wind that affects southeastern Australia)
- Southerly buster (rapidly arriving low pressure cell that dramatically cools southeast Australian cities such as Sydney and Melbourne during summer)

=== Hawaii ===
- Kona (southeast wind in Hawaii, replacing trade winds, bringing high humidity and often rain)

=== New Guinea ===
- Warm Braw (föhn wind in the Schouten Islands, north of New Guinea)

=== New Zealand ===
- Kaimai Breeze (turbulent wind with strong downdrafts in the Kaimai Range of North Island, New Zealand)
- Nor'wester (wind that brings rain to the West Coast, and warm dry winds to the East Coast of New Zealand's South Island, caused by the moist prevailing winds being uplifted over the Southern Alps, often accompanied by a distinctive arched cloud pattern)
