= Climate of Delhi =

New Delhi, Safdarjung (1991-2020)

Climate chart (precipitation, max. and min. temperature)
J	F	M	A	M	J	J	A	S	O	N	D
19 20 8	21 24 11	17 30 15	16 36 21	31 40 26	74 39 28	210 36 28	233 34 27	124 34 25	15 33 19	6 28 13	8 23 8
- █ Average max. and min. temperatures in °C
- █ Precipitation totals in mm
- Source: IMD
Imperial conversion
J	F	M	A	M	J	J	A	S	O	N	D
0.8 68 46	0.8 76 51	0.7 86 60	0.6 97 70	1.2 104 78	2.9 102 82	8.3 96 82	9.2 94 80	4.9 93 77	0.6 91 67	0.2 83 55	0.3 73 47
- █ Average max. and min. temperatures in °F
- █ Precipitation totals in inches

The climate of Delhi in the National Capital Region features a humid subtropical climate (Köppen Cwa). This features very hot summers accompanied by frequent thunderstorms locally known as andhi, and mild winters that are characterized by dense fog. The city's rainfall pattern is heavily influenced by the summer monsoon entering in late June and continuing till mid-September, and western disturbances occurring from November to March.

Summer starts in early April and peaks in late May or early June, with average temperatures near 38 °C (100 °F) although occasional heat waves can result in highs close to 45 °C (113 °F) on some days and therefore higher apparent temperature. The monsoon starts in late June and lasts until mid-September, with about 797.3 mm (31.39 inches) of rain. The average temperatures are around 29 °C (84 °F), although they can vary from around 25 °C (77 °F) on rainy days to 35–40 °C (95–104 °F) during dry spells. The monsoons recede in late September, and the post-monsoon season continues till late October, with average temperatures sliding from 29 to 21 °C (84 to 70 °F).

Winter starts in November and peaks in January, with average temperatures around 14 °C (57 °F). Although daytime temperatures are warm, Delhi's proximity to the Himalayas results in cold waves leading to lower apparent temperature due to wind chill. Delhi experiences heavy fog and haze during the winter season. In December, reduced visibility leads to disruption of road, air and rail traffic. Winter generally ends by the first week of March.

Extreme temperatures have ranged from −2.2 to 49.9 °C (28.0 to 121.8 °F).

== Classifications ==
Delhi Climate according to major climate systems
Climatic scheme	Initials	Description
Köppen system	Cwa	Humid subtropical climate
Trewartha system	Cf	Subtropical dry winter climate
Alisov system	—N/a	Subtropical climate
Strahler system	—N/a	Dry subtropical semi-arid
Thornthwaite system	DA'd	Semi-arid and megathermal
Neef system	—N/a	Tropical alternating climate equatorial climate

== Overview of seasonal distribution ==
- Spring: Mid-February to Early-April; warm days, cool nights, pleasant; low to moderate humidity; moderate precipitation
- Summer: Mid-April to Late June; hot to very hot; very low to moderate humidity; moderate precipitation
- Monsoon: July to Mid September; hot, pleasant during rains; high to very high humidity; heavy precipitation
- Autumn: Late September to November; warm days, cool nights, pleasant; low humidity; very low precipitation
- Winter: December to Early February; cool days, cold nights; moderate humidity; low precipitation

== Seasons ==
Delhi lies in the landlocked Northern Plains of the Indian subcontinent. Its climate is greatly influenced by its proximity to the Himalayas and the Thar Desert, causing it to experience both weather extremes. Delhi has 5 distinct seasons, Summer, Rainy, Autumn, Winter and Spring. Broadly speaking, Delhi has long and scorching summers, sub-divided into dry summer and humid monsoon seasons, short and mildly cold winters, and two bouts of pleasant transition seasons. The two most important wind patterns influencing Delhi's climate are the Western Disturbance and the South-West Winds.

=== Summer ===
Summer begins in mid April and continues till late June, with the heat peaking in late May and early June. It is characterized by extreme heat, low humidity, very hot winds and thunderstorms. Delhi's proximity to the Thar Desert results in hot, dry continental winds, called loo, at times blowing all across from the West Asian mainland, making the days feel hotter. These winds, blowing over from vast land stretches, are very hot and dry. Since the Western Disturbance depression moves eastward (and is the reason for cyclonic occurrences in Eastern Coastal areas) by this time of the year, there is no moisture-laden wind to increase humidity. The air therefore remains dry or very dry during the day. For most of its summer season, Delhi has a semi-arid climate. Coming from Spring, the city witnesses a spurt in day temperature around early April, whereas nights still remain pleasant. By the latter part of April or during early May, maximum temperatures exceed 40 °C (104 °F) while the ambience remains very dry. Night temperatures cross the 20 °C (68 °F) mark towards the latter part of April. May is Delhi's hottest month during which temperatures may reach 45 °C (113 °F) or higher. This month is characterized by frequent thunderstorms, and can be severe and destructive when accompanied by strong winds, particularly under cumulonimbus formation. These storms also bring fine dust along by the hot winds arriving from the desert. They make the surroundings appear pale yellow, bring temperatures slightly down and are usually followed by heavy thundershowers. Post late-June, temperatures start falling slowly, while humidity shows a gradual rise. A visual characteristic of summer in Delhi is the summer bloom, particularly the blooming Bougainvillea, Amaltas, Gulmohar, Shireesh and Jacaranda trees, which are in full flower during peak summer in May.

=== Monsoon ===
Monsoon winds arrive in Delhi by either the end of June or the first week of July. The arrival of moisture-laden South-Western winds, travelling from the Arabian Sea marks the onset of the humid season in Delhi. This season is marked by high levels of humidity and high heat. Day temperatures drop below 40 °C (104 °F) as humidity suddenly soars. July is marked by high heat and relatively less precipitation (as compared to August). This transition from scorching to sweltering heat between June and July makes the latter feel very uncomfortable. August is Delhi's wettest month. The heat is considerably reduced and it is relatively cooler for most of the month. There is dense cloud formation in the sky and at least a week of distinct, heavy rainfall. By September, the amount and frequency of precipitation drops, though humidity remains high. Towards the end of September, the moisture content in the air begins to fall and monsoon ends by early October. In India, the rainy season is referred to as "Rituraani", meaning the Queen of Seasons.

=== Autumn ===
The end of the monsoon marks the arrival of a transition season. Autumn arrives by early or mid-October and is marked by a very dry ambience, warm days and pleasant nights. Maximum temperatures drop below 30 °C (86 °F) by late October and there is a gradual fall in average temperature. The minimum temperature drops below 20 °C (68 °F). During Autumn, the wind direction begins changing from South-Westerly to North-Westerly. In recent decades, Delhi has seen a hazardous increase in air pollution levels and toxic smog for several weeks between late October and the end of November caused by stubble burning by farmers in the Indian states lying north of Delhi for fresh sowing at this time of the year, which is exacerbated by the usually almost still air around this time that causes the pollutants to hang in Delhi's air for many days. Around late autumn, the variation between morning and afternoon temperatures in a day becomes considerable, and can often be more than 20 °C (36 °F), with minimum dropping to under 10 °C (50 °F) and maximum still hovering slightly under 30 °C (86 °F). This season ends in early December.

=== Winter ===
Winter arrives in Delhi by early December. Minimum temperatures gradually enter single digits by this time of the year, while days are cool. Though usually not very cold initially, December suddenly becomes cold in the latter half, as chilly north-western winds from the Himalayas begin sweeping the Northern Plains. These cold waves are caused by a depression created by Western Disturbance, which bring cloud cover and winter rains to the Plains, and add to snowfall in the North-Western Indian subcontinent. By early January, when winter peaks in Delhi, the minimum temperatures plunge to the vicinity of 0 °C (32 °F), though very rarely entering the negative scale. Maximum temperatures, too may drop down into single digits and always stay under 15 °C (59 °F). When the minimum temperature ventures very close to the 0 °C (32 °F) mark, Delhi witnesses frost. Snow is a practical impossibility for Delhi (and the rest of Northern Plains) due to very dry nature of its winter- the coldest conditions happen under clear skies when icy winds rush in from the Himalayas, and a cloud cover (which is necessary for causing snowfall) rather warms the city by trapping heat, thereby junking any possibility of snow. Delhi's winter is marked by very dense fog (not to be confused with smog that occurs in the month of November), which dramatically reduces visibility and makes days colder by cutting off sunlight. In the opposite scenario, cold north-westerly winds from the upper reaches of Himalayas blowing across the city make the days feel colder, despite any sunshine and the nights further cold. Post-mid-January, average temperatures begin to rise very gradually, though the rise is almost contained by the cold north-western winds which result due to very heavy snowfall that occurs in the Himalayas during this part of the month. It may rain towards the end of January and the precipitation is usually accompanied by hail, resulting in slight increase in minimum temperatures due to cloud cover. Maximum temperatures again cross 20 °C (68 °F) and days become pleasant. By mid-February or somewhat beyond, minimum temperatures cross the 10 °C (50 °F) mark and days start getting warmer gradually, marking the end of winter. Delhi can sometimes have a prolonged season of chill, extending into March.

=== Spring ===
Around the middle of February, Delhi's climate sees another transition, this time from Winter to Summer. The transition weather is known as Spring and is characterized by warm days, cool nights, dry ambience and lively natural surroundings. The weather is pleasant and there is warm, brilliant sunshine during the day. For all its characteristics, in India it is referred to as "Rituraaj", meaning the King of Seasons. Spring rains are a characteristic of this season. These rains may be accompanied by hail and can be heavy. Average temperatures show a slow, gradual rise as the wind direction shift from North-West to South-West, thereby getting warmer. Around late spring/ early summer, the variation between morning and afternoon temperatures in a day becomes considerable, and can often be more than 20 °C (68 °F), with maximum rising to mid 30s °C (93–97 °F) and minimum in the mid 10s °C (57–61 °F). Spring ends by the latter half of March and the day temperatures exceed 30 °C (86 °F) by then, marking the onset of the next summer.

== Rainfall ==
Delhi receives an average annual precipitation of 774.4 mm.

== Artificial rain as a pollution mitigation measure ==
As part of long-term efforts to tackle severe air pollution, the Delhi government has incorporated cloud seeding for artificial rain into its environmental response strategy. The initiative, aimed at reducing particulate matter and improving air quality, is carried out during periods of conducive weather conditions. IIT Kanpur oversees the technical aspects of the project, with operational clearances obtained from the Directorate General of Civil Aviation (DGCA). The first such implementation was scheduled between July 4 and 11, 2025, marking the beginning of artificial rain as a climate intervention tool in the region

== Climate data ==
Temperature records for Delhi exist for a period of a little over 100 years. The lowest ever temperature reading during this period is −2.2 °C (28.0 °F), recorded on 11 January 1967 at Met Delhi Palam. The highest ever temperature reading during the same period is 49.9 °C (121.8 °F) recorded on 28 and 29 May 2024, at IMD Delhi Mungeshpur. The highest temperature ever recorded in June is 48.0 °C (118.4 °F) on 10 June 2019 at Met Indira Gandhi International Airport, Palam. The highest & lowest ever temperature recorded at Safdarjung are 47.2 °C (117.0 °F) on 29 May 1944 & −0.6 °C (30.9 °F) on 16 January 1935. The highest & lowest ever temperature recorded at Palam are 48.4 °C (119.1 °F) on 26 May 1998 & −2.2 °C (28.0 °F) on 11 January 1967. The highest & lowest ever temperature recorded at Ayanagar are 47.6 °C (117.7 °F) on 28 May 2024 & −1.3 °C (29.7 °F) on 22 January 1977. The highest & lowest ever temperature recorded at Delhi Ridge are 47.9 °C (118.2 °F) on 10 June 2019 & −0.3 °C (31.5 °F) on 2 January 2024.

Climate data for New Delhi (Safdarjung) 1991–2020 normals, extremes 1901–present
Month	Jan	Feb	Mar	Apr	May	Jun	Jul	Aug	Sep	Oct	Nov	Dec	Year
Record high °C (°F)	32.5 (90.5)	34.1 (93.4)	40.6 (105.1)	45.6 (114.1)	47.2 (117.0)	46.7 (116.1)	45.0 (113.0)	42.0 (107.6)	40.6 (105.1)	39.4 (102.9)	36.1 (97.0)	30.0 (86.0)	47.2 (117.0)
Mean maximum °C (°F)	25.8 (78.4)	29.5 (85.1)	35.8 (96.4)	41.4 (106.5)	44.3 (111.7)	43.7 (110.7)	40.1 (104.2)	37.4 (99.3)	37.1 (98.8)	36.1 (97.0)	32.2 (90.0)	27.3 (81.1)	44.8 (112.6)
Mean daily maximum °C (°F)	20.1 (68.2)	24.2 (75.6)	29.9 (85.8)	36.5 (97.7)	39.9 (103.8)	39.0 (102.2)	35.6 (96.1)	34.2 (93.6)	34.1 (93.4)	33.0 (91.4)	28.4 (83.1)	22.8 (73.0)	31.4 (88.5)
Daily mean °C (°F)	13.8 (56.8)	17.4 (63.3)	22.7 (72.9)	28.9 (84.0)	32.7 (90.9)	33.3 (91.9)	31.5 (88.7)	30.4 (86.7)	29.5 (85.1)	26.2 (79.2)	20.5 (68.9)	15.6 (60.1)	25.2 (77.4)
Mean daily minimum °C (°F)	7.5 (45.5)	10.6 (51.1)	15.6 (60.1)	21.3 (70.3)	25.8 (78.4)	27.7 (81.9)	27.5 (81.5)	26.7 (80.1)	25.0 (77.0)	19.5 (67.1)	13.0 (55.4)	8.4 (47.1)	18.9 (66.0)
Mean minimum °C (°F)	3.5 (38.3)	6.0 (42.8)	10.7 (51.3)	16.3 (61.3)	20.5 (68.9)	22.2 (72.0)	24.3 (75.7)	23.7 (74.7)	21.9 (71.4)	15.0 (59.0)	8.8 (47.8)	4.5 (40.1)	3.1 (37.6)
Record low °C (°F)	−0.6 (30.9)	1.6 (34.9)	4.4 (39.9)	10.7 (51.3)	15.1 (59.2)	17.6 (63.7)	20.3 (68.5)	20.7 (69.3)	16.1 (61.0)	9.4 (48.9)	3.9 (39.0)	0.0 (32.0)	−0.6 (30.9)
Average rainfall mm (inches)	19.1 (0.75)	21.3 (0.84)	17.4 (0.69)	16.3 (0.64)	30.7 (1.21)	74.1 (2.92)	209.7 (8.26)	233.1 (9.18)	123.5 (4.86)	15.1 (0.59)	6.0 (0.24)	8.1 (0.32)	774.4 (30.5)
Average rainy days	1.7	1.5	1.7	1.0	2.7	4.8	9.7	10.2	5.5	0.8	0.4	0.6	40.6
Average relative humidity (%) (at 17:30 IST)	57	46	37	25	28	43	63	68	60	47	52	59	49
Average dew point °C (°F)	8 (46)	11 (52)	14 (57)	14 (57)	18 (64)	22 (72)	26 (79)	25 (77)	23 (73)	18 (64)	14 (57)	10 (50)	17 (62)
Mean monthly sunshine hours	220.1	223.2	248.0	276.0	285.2	219.0	179.8	176.7	219.0	260.4	246.0	220.1	2,773.5
Mean daily sunshine hours	7.1	7.9	8.0	9.2	9.2	7.3	5.8	5.7	7.3	8.4	8.2	7.1	7.6
Mean daily daylight hours	10.6	11.2	12.0	12.9	13.6	13.9	13.8	13.1	12.3	11.5	10.7	10.3	12.2
Percentage possible sunshine	67	71	67	71	68	53	42	44	59	73	77	69	63
Average ultraviolet index	3	5	6	7	9	9	8	7	6	5	4	3	6
Source: India Meteorological Department (sun 1971–2000); Time and Date (dewpoints, 2005–2015) Revised Rainfall data Weather Atlas (UV Index)(Daylight)

Average Barometric Pressure & Wind Speed of Delhi
Month	Jan	Feb	Mar	Apr	May	Jun	Jul	Aug	Sep	Oct	Nov	Dec	Year
Average Atmospheric pressure milibars (inHg)	1,017.0 millibars (30.03 inHg)	1,014.5 millibars (29.96 inHg)	1,010.6 millibars (29.84 inHg)	1,005.4 millibars (29.69 inHg)	1,000.5 millibars (29.54 inHg)	996.7 millibars (29.43 inHg)	996.9 millibars (29.44 inHg)	999.4 millibars (29.51 inHg)	1,003.4 millibars (29.63 inHg)	1,009.6 millibars (29.81 inHg)	1,013.6 millibars (29.93 inHg)	1,016.1 millibars (30.01 inHg)	1,007.0 millibars (29.74 inHg)
Average Wind Speed kilometres per hour (mph)	8.3 kilometres per hour (5.2 mph)	9.4 kilometres per hour (5.8 mph)	9.5 kilometres per hour (5.9 mph)	10.0 kilometres per hour (6.2 mph)	10.2 kilometres per hour (6.3 mph)	10.6 kilometres per hour (6.6 mph)	9.5 kilometres per hour (5.9 mph)	8.8 kilometres per hour (5.5 mph)	8.3 kilometres per hour (5.2 mph)	6.7 kilometres per hour (4.2 mph)	7.6 kilometres per hour (4.7 mph)	7.7 kilometres per hour (4.8 mph)	8.9 kilometres per hour (5.5 mph)

Climate data for Delhi (DEL), 1991–2020 normals, extremes 1952–present
Month	Jan	Feb	Mar	Apr	May	Jun	Jul	Aug	Sep	Oct	Nov	Dec	Year
Record high °C (°F)	31.0 (87.8)	35.7 (96.3)	41.3 (106.3)	45.3 (113.5)	48.4 (119.1)	48.0 (118.4)	45.7 (114.3)	43.2 (109.8)	40.8 (105.4)	39.6 (103.3)	36.4 (97.5)	30.4 (86.7)	48.4 (119.1)
Mean maximum °C (°F)	26.1 (79.0)	29.5 (85.1)	36.4 (97.5)	42.6 (108.7)	45.3 (113.5)	44.9 (112.8)	40.9 (105.6)	38.2 (100.8)	37.8 (100.0)	36.8 (98.2)	32.7 (90.9)	27.4 (81.3)	45.3 (113.5)
Mean daily maximum °C (°F)	19.9 (67.8)	24.1 (75.4)	30.0 (86.0)	37.1 (98.8)	40.7 (105.3)	39.6 (103.3)	36.0 (96.8)	34.5 (94.1)	34.4 (93.9)	33.3 (91.9)	28.3 (82.9)	22.7 (72.9)	31.7 (89.1)
Daily mean °C (°F)	13.6 (56.5)	17.4 (63.3)	22.7 (72.9)	29.4 (84.9)	33.6 (92.5)	33.8 (92.8)	31.7 (89.1)	30.5 (86.9)	29.7 (85.5)	26.6 (79.9)	21.0 (69.8)	15.9 (60.6)	25.5 (77.9)
Mean daily minimum °C (°F)	7.3 (45.1)	10.6 (51.1)	15.4 (59.7)	21.7 (71.1)	26.4 (79.5)	27.9 (82.2)	27.4 (81.3)	26.4 (79.5)	24.9 (76.8)	19.9 (67.8)	13.7 (56.7)	9.0 (48.2)	19.2 (66.6)
Mean minimum °C (°F)	3.6 (38.5)	6.2 (43.2)	9.7 (49.5)	15.3 (59.5)	20.8 (69.4)	22.3 (72.1)	24.1 (75.4)	23.3 (73.9)	21.7 (71.1)	15.6 (60.1)	9.0 (48.2)	4.6 (40.3)	3.3 (37.9)
Record low °C (°F)	−2.2 (28.0)	−1.6 (29.1)	3.4 (38.1)	8.6 (47.5)	14.6 (58.3)	19.8 (67.6)	17.8 (64.0)	20.2 (68.4)	13.6 (56.5)	9.9 (49.8)	2.1 (35.8)	−1.3 (29.7)	−2.2 (28.0)
Average rainfall mm (inches)	18.1 (0.71)	19.3 (0.76)	15.2 (0.60)	13.6 (0.54)	30.2 (1.19)	68.8 (2.71)	205.7 (8.10)	214.2 (8.43)	109.5 (4.31)	12.7 (0.50)	5.5 (0.22)	6.4 (0.25)	719.2 (28.32)
Average rainy days	1.4	1.6	1.4	1.2	2.7	4.0	8.9	9.4	5.0	0.8	0.4	0.4	37.2
Average relative humidity (%) (at 17:30 IST)	56	48	36	24	25	42	62	67	59	43	44	54	47
Source 1: India Meteorological Department
Source 2: Tokyo Climate Center (mean temperatures 1991–2020);

Climate data for South Delhi (Ayanagar) 1991–2020, extremes 1967–present
Month	Jan	Feb	Mar	Apr	May	Jun	Jul	Aug	Sep	Oct	Nov	Dec	Year
Record high °C (°F)	29.7 (85.5)	33.2 (91.8)	40.6 (105.1)	45.0 (113.0)	47.6 (117.7)	47.0 (116.6)	44.8 (112.6)	42.7 (108.9)	41.0 (105.8)	39.4 (102.9)	36.4 (97.5)	30.2 (86.4)	47.6 (117.7)
Mean maximum °C (°F)	25.2 (77.4)	29.4 (84.9)	36.2 (97.2)	42.8 (109.0)	45.9 (114.6)	45.6 (114.1)	41.5 (106.7)	38.3 (100.9)	37.2 (99.0)	36.2 (97.2)	32.2 (90.0)	27.7 (81.9)	46.2 (115.2)
Mean daily maximum °C (°F)	19.2 (66.6)	24.3 (75.7)	30.7 (87.3)	36.8 (98.2)	41.2 (106.2)	40.5 (104.9)	35.7 (96.3)	34.3 (93.7)	34.2 (93.6)	33.4 (92.1)	28.3 (82.9)	22.2 (72.0)	31.7 (89.1)
Mean daily minimum °C (°F)	7.7 (45.9)	11.0 (51.8)	15.4 (59.7)	21.0 (69.8)	25.5 (77.9)	27.1 (80.8)	26.5 (79.7)	25.8 (78.4)	24.2 (75.6)	19.5 (67.1)	14.2 (57.6)	8.3 (46.9)	18.9 (66.0)
Mean minimum °C (°F)	3.6 (38.5)	6.8 (44.2)	10.5 (50.9)	16.3 (61.3)	19.7 (67.5)	20.6 (69.1)	22.8 (73.0)	23.1 (73.6)	21.5 (70.7)	14.5 (58.1)	9.8 (49.6)	3.2 (37.8)	2.9 (37.2)
Record low °C (°F)	−1.3 (29.7)	0.0 (32.0)	3.8 (38.8)	8.4 (47.1)	13.8 (56.8)	18.0 (64.4)	19.8 (67.6)	21.3 (70.3)	14.0 (57.2)	9.4 (48.9)	3.2 (37.8)	−0.5 (31.1)	−1.3 (29.7)
Average rainfall mm (inches)	18.0 (0.71)	19.8 (0.78)	21.6 (0.85)	10.7 (0.42)	31.1 (1.22)	71.8 (2.83)	182.2 (7.17)	188.4 (7.42)	106.1 (4.18)	13.8 (0.54)	2.1 (0.08)	5.4 (0.21)	671.0 (26.42)
Average rainy days	1.6	1.6	2.1	1.0	2.8	4.5	8.5	8.6	4.7	0.6	0.3	0.4	36.7
Average relative humidity (%) (at 17:30 IST)	64	52	40	26	24	37	64	68	63	50	52	58	51
Source: India Meteorological Department February record high May record high

Climate data for Old Delhi (North Ridge) 1991–2020, extremes 1971–present
Month	Jan	Feb	Mar	Apr	May	Jun	Jul	Aug	Sep	Oct	Nov	Dec	Year
Record high °C (°F)	27.5 (81.5)	34.2 (93.6)	40.9 (105.6)	45.7 (114.3)	47.5 (117.5)	47.9 (118.2)	42.5 (108.5)	40.4 (104.7)	38.4 (101.1)	38.4 (101.1)	34.2 (93.6)	29.8 (85.6)	47.9 (118.2)
Mean maximum °C (°F)	24.4 (75.9)	29.6 (85.3)	36.4 (97.5)	42.8 (109.0)	45.7 (114.3)	44.8 (112.6)	40.4 (104.7)	37.7 (99.9)	36.8 (98.2)	36.4 (97.5)	32.5 (90.5)	27.2 (81.0)	45.9 (114.6)
Mean daily maximum °C (°F)	19.0 (66.2)	24.4 (75.9)	31.0 (87.8)	37.0 (98.6)	40.7 (105.3)	39.8 (103.6)	35.1 (95.2)	33.9 (93.0)	34.0 (93.2)	33.4 (92.1)	28.0 (82.4)	22.5 (72.5)	31.4 (88.5)
Mean daily minimum °C (°F)	8.7 (47.7)	12.1 (53.8)	16.8 (62.2)	22.0 (71.6)	25.9 (78.6)	27.0 (80.6)	26.1 (79.0)	25.5 (77.9)	24.1 (75.4)	20.3 (68.5)	15.1 (59.2)	9.9 (49.8)	19.2 (66.6)
Mean minimum °C (°F)	5.4 (41.7)	9.0 (48.2)	12.0 (53.6)	17.4 (63.3)	20.7 (69.3)	21.3 (70.3)	22.7 (72.9)	23.2 (73.8)	21.5 (70.7)	17.0 (62.6)	11.5 (52.7)	5.3 (41.5)	4.7 (40.5)
Record low °C (°F)	−0.3 (31.5)	7.0 (44.6)	10.2 (50.4)	11.6 (52.9)	14.2 (57.6)	16.7 (62.1)	20.4 (68.7)	19.4 (66.9)	16.8 (62.2)	12.4 (54.3)	9.7 (49.5)	3.0 (37.4)	−0.3 (31.5)
Average rainfall mm (inches)	20.1 (0.79)	19.5 (0.77)	17.8 (0.70)	7.6 (0.30)	34.0 (1.34)	60.7 (2.39)	190.1 (7.48)	190.2 (7.49)	119.3 (4.70)	26.5 (1.04)	2.1 (0.08)	6.1 (0.24)	694 (27.32)
Average rainy days	1.9	1.5	1.3	1.1	2.4	3.9	8.3	9.4	5.2	0.5	0.3	0.5	36.3
Average relative humidity (%) (at 17:30 IST)	66	54	41	29	31	44	71	76	68	55	54	62	55
Source: India Meteorological Department February record high May record low May record high Sep record low

Climate data for Delhi extremes 1901–present
Month	Jan	Feb	Mar	Apr	May	Jun	Jul	Aug	Sep	Oct	Nov	Dec	Year
Record high °C (°F)	32.5 (90.5)	35.7 (96.3)	42.0 (107.6)	47.1 (116.8)	49.9 (121.8)	48.0 (118.4)	45.7 (114.3)	43.2 (109.8)	41.0 (105.8)	39.6 (103.3)	36.4 (97.5)	30.4 (86.7)	49.9 (121.8)
Record low °C (°F)	−2.2 (28.0)	−1.6 (29.1)	3.4 (38.1)	8.4 (47.1)	13.8 (56.8)	16.7 (62.1)	17.8 (64.0)	20.2 (68.4)	13.6 (56.5)	9.4 (48.9)	2.1 (35.8)	−1.3 (29.7)	−2.2 (28.0)

== Weather monitoring stations ==
As of January 2024, the India Meteorological Department website lists 20 weather monitoring stations in Delhi. The readings at Safdarjung station, located in the central part of the city are taken as those for the city, whereas the readings at Palam station, located in the city's south-western part, are taken as those for the Airport.

== Day-length variation ==
Located at 28°36′36″N latitude, Delhi lies in the sub-tropical belt of Earth's North Temperate geographical region, a few latitudes north of the Tropic of Cancer. As such the rotation of Earth has its effect on the city's day-length, which shortens during winters and lengthens during summers. Between the two solstices, Delhi's day-length changes by about 4 hours, offset by some 2 hours each at sunrise and sunset.
