= Berg wind =

Wind in South Africa

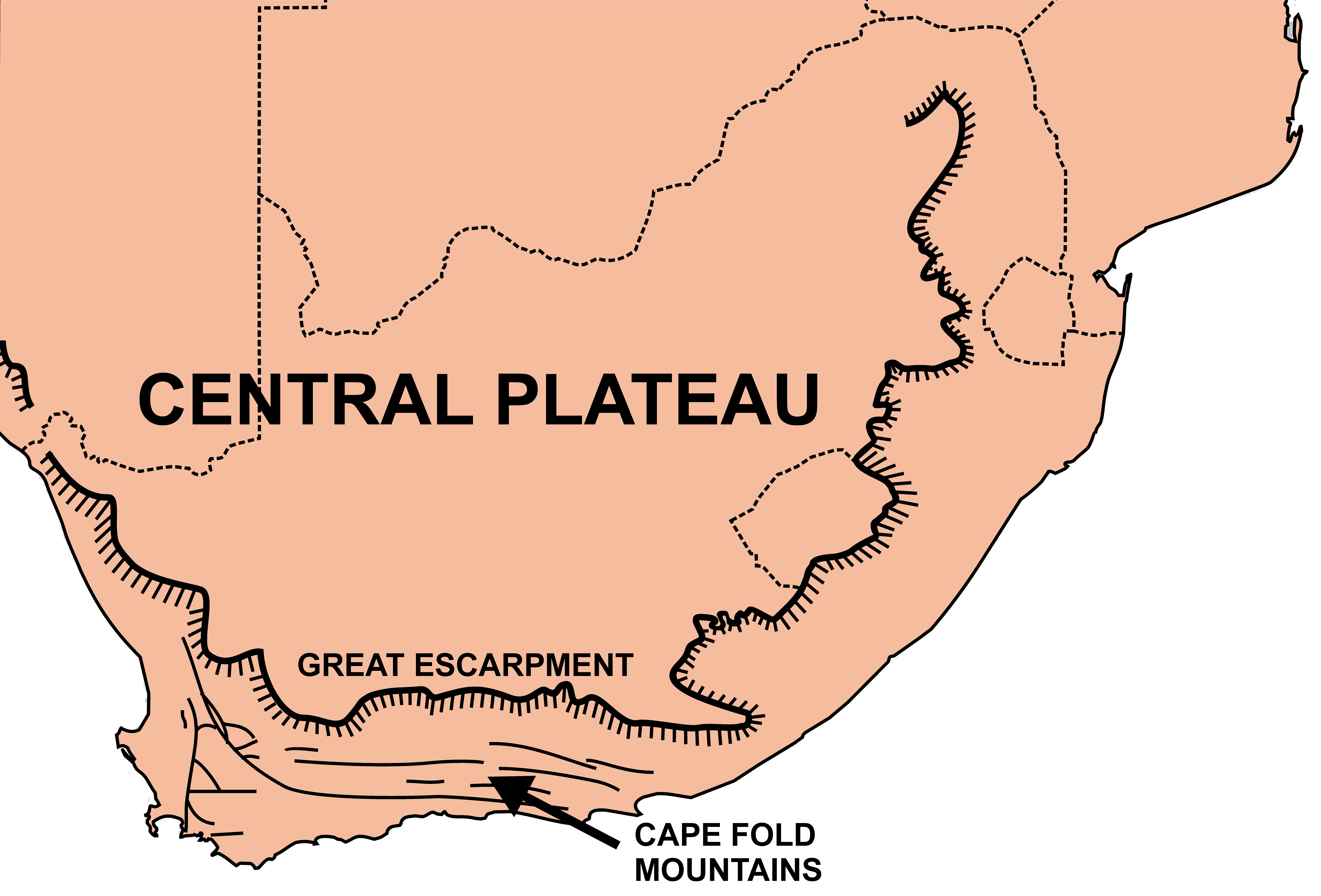
The Southern African Central Plateau edged by the Great Escarpment.

Berg wind (from Afrikaans berg "mountain" + wind "wind", i.e. a mountain wind) is the South African name for a katabatic wind: a hot dry wind blowing down the Great Escarpment from the high central plateau to the coast.

== Overview ==
When the air that has been heated on the extensive central plateau flows down the escarpment to the coast, it undergoes further warming by adiabatic processes. This accounts for the hot and dry properties of these offshore winds, wherever they occur along South Africa's coastline.

Although berg winds are often called Föhn winds, this is probably a misnomer, as Föhn winds are rain shadow winds that result from air moving over a mountain range, resulting in precipitation on the windward side. This releases latent heat into the atmosphere, which is then warmed still further as the air descends on the leeward side (e.g. the Chinook or the original Föhn). Berg winds do not originate in precipitation, but in the mostly dry, often arid central plateau of Southern Africa. On the other hand, katabatic winds are technically drainage winds, which carry high density, usually cold, air from a high elevation down a slope under the force of gravity. These are thus "fall winds", which occur most typically down the coastal ice slopes of Antarctica and Greenland. Berg winds blow off the African escarpment in response to large-scale weather systems in the South Atlantic Ocean, the African interior, and the Southern Indian Ocean.

== Coastal lows and berg winds ==
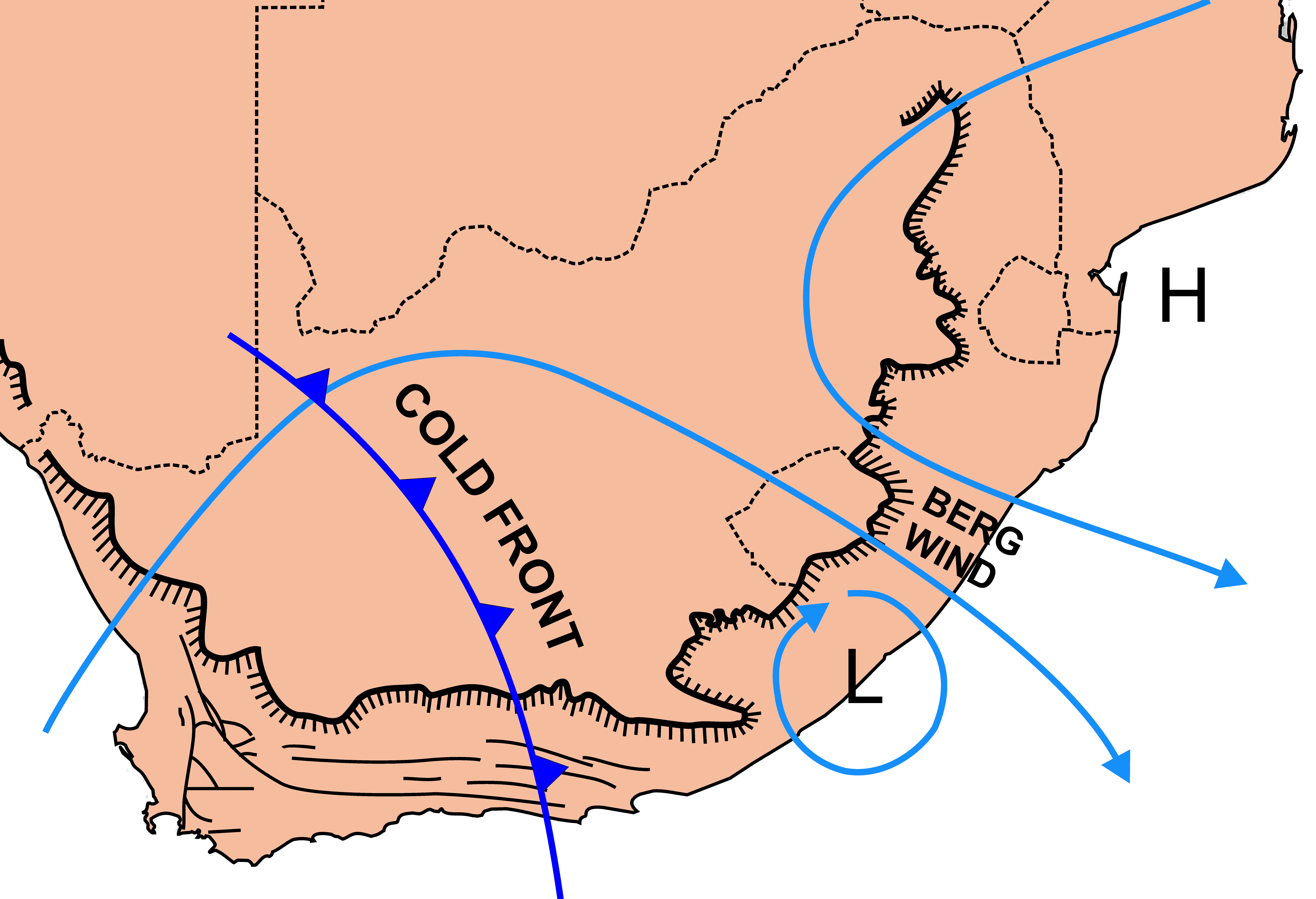
The weather pattern commonly associated with a berg wind and accompanying coastal low along the coast of South Africa. The light blue lines indicate surface wind directions. The "H" indicates the position of a portion of the South Indian Ocean Anticyclone (high pressure system); the "L" indicates the position of the coastal low.

Berg winds are usually accompanied by coastal lows. These coastal lows owe their existence to the configuration of the plateau, escarpment and coastal plain (see diagram on the right, above), in that they are confined to the coastal areas, always below the escarpment. Though they can arise almost anywhere along the coast, they often first appear on the west coast, or even on the Namibian coast. They are then always propagated counter-clockwise along South Africa's coastline at between 30 and 60 kilometres per hour (19 and 37 mph), from the west coast southwards to the Cape Peninsula and then eastward along the south coast, and finally north-eastward along the KwaZulu-Natal coastline, to finally dissipate north of Durban, due to the divergence of the coastline from the plateau which disappears altogether in the vicinity of the Limpopo valley. There is always a hot off-shore berg wind ahead of a coastal low, which can blow for several days or for only for a few hours. This is then followed by cool onshore winds which bring low cloud, fog or drizzle to the region, but may, on occasions, produce substantial precipitation when coupled to an approaching cold front.

Coastal lows are a common feature of the coastal weather in South Africa with an average of about five lows of varying intensities passing through Port Elizabeth per month. They are shallow (not more than 1,000 to 1,500 metres (3,300 to 4,900 ft) deep), mesoscale (medium-sized) systems that are generally not more than 100 to 200 kilometres (60 to 120 mi) across, trapped on the coastal plain by the escarpment on the inland side, Coriolis effects on the oceanic side, and an inversion layer above. The pressure minima of these systems lie just off-shore. In the south-west corner of the country the coastal lows are bounded on the inland side by the Cape Fold Mountains, which tend to have a higher elevation than the escarpment, and form an almost continuous 1,000 kilometres (620 mi) mountain barrier running parallel to the coast from the Cederberg, 300 kilometres (190 mi) to the north of Cape Town, to Cape Hangklip on the east side of False Bay and then eastwards for 700 kilometres (430 mi) to Port Elizabeth, where they eventually peter out (see the map above).

== Origin of coastal lows ==
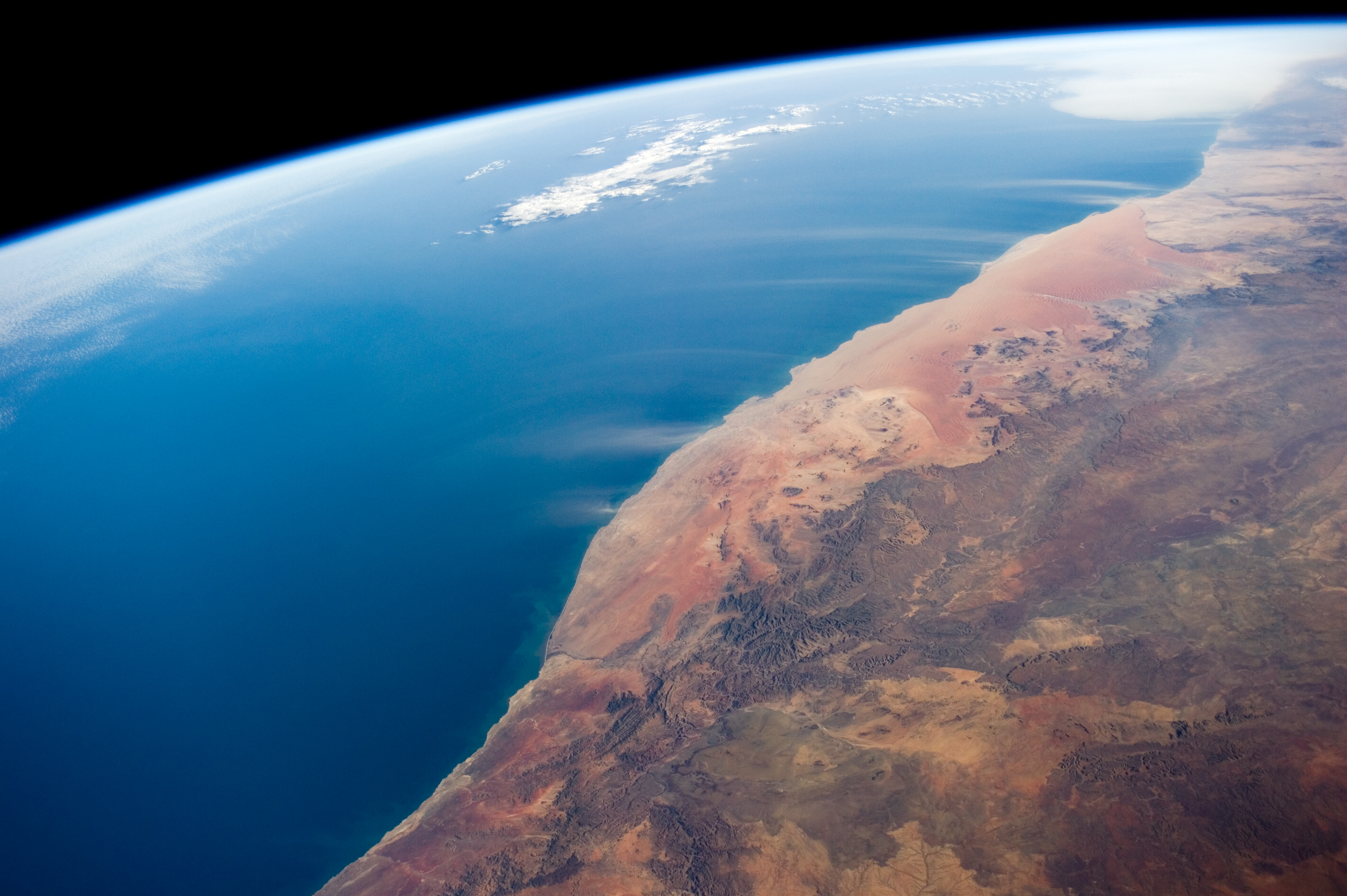
Berg wind blowing desert sand off the Namibian coast. These strong, hot winds are lofting plumes of dust directly out into the Atlantic Ocean in this panoramic image. The southern African equivalent of Santa Ana winds in California, berg winds blow on a few occasions in fall and winter, off all coasts of southern Africa. Namibia's great Sand Sea appears here as a reddish zone along the central part of the coast. It is more than 350 kilometers long, giving a sense of the length of the visible dust plumes.

Coastal lows are initiated by the interaction of large scale weather systems such as the quasi-permanent South Atlantic and South Indian Ocean Anticyclones (high-pressure systems), the cold fronts that approach the subcontinent from the South Atlantic Ocean, as well as the pressure systems on the plateau, causing air that has been warmed on the plateau by 2–3 days of sunny weather to flow down the Great Escarpment on to the coastal plain either on the west or south coasts of the country (i.e. causing a berg wind). The descending air warms up adiabatically, heating up the coastal plain, while, at the same time, causing an off-shore wind which blows the surface water away from the land to be replaced by cold water which wells up from the depths. This upwelling of cold subsurface water from the ocean increases the ocean-land temperature difference, causing an on-shore wind.

The on-shore airflow is strengthened by the fact that the berg wind is not only hot, but it is also “stretched” vertically due to the sudden lowering of the floor over which it moves below the escarpment. Its low density, therefore, lowers the atmospheric pressure on the coast. This low-pressure area caused by the berg wind draws the dense moist maritime air onshore to the right of the off-shore berg wind. Shear forces between these on- and off-shore winds on the right-hand side of the berg wind tend to cause clockwise (or cyclonic) rotation of the air in this region. In addition, on reaching the escarpment the maritime air curves to the right round the low-pressure zone due to Coriolis forces (in the southern hemisphere) accentuating the cyclonic circulation of the "coastal low". The entire system is capped by an inversion consisting of a layer of warm air that has moved horizontally off the plateau at the level of the upper edge of the escarpment. This inversion layer prevents the upwardly spiraling cyclonic air of the coastal low from rising above 1000–1500 m, thus preventing it from causing significant precipitation.

== The weather associated with a coastal low ==
Along the south coast the passage of a coastal low is typically preceded by a north-easterly wind driven by the South Indian Ocean Anticyclone. The wind then backs quickly through northerly to north-westerly as its temperature rises. This is the berg wind phase of the coastal low. The wind then changes abruptly to a strong, cold, south or south-westerly wind (called a “buster” if the change in wind speed is greater than 35 km/h). The buster coincides with the passage of the pressure minimum. The onshore wind gradually diminishes in intensity during the course of about a day, and is associated with cloudy, misty or drizzly weather.

Because of the often abrupt changes in horizontal and vertical wind speeds and direction that can occur within these small weather systems they represent a significant hazard to aircraft on landing and taking off. During the climb-out and approach phases of flight, aircraft airspeed and height are near critical values, thus rendering the aircraft especially susceptible to the adverse effects of these wind shears.

The Atlantic cold fronts that move into and across the subcontinent, especially during the cooler months of the year, are frequently associated, the day before, by a coastal low that moves ahead of the front. Under these circumstances the southerly or south-westerly onshore wind of the coastal low gradually diminishes in intensity over the course of 12–20 hours, when it is replaced by a westerly wind (which may temporarily reach buster proportions) and a further drop in temperature accompanied by rain, indicative of the passage of the cold front. Thus, particularly in Cape Town, an obvious berg wind is generally regarded as a harbinger of cold, wet weather.

== Other orographically trapped weather systems ==
Coastal lows are orographically trapped weather systems that also occur in other parts of the world, where there are mountain ranges between 1,000–4,000 kilometres (600–2,500 mi) in length. Thus they occur along the coast of Chile, eastern Australia and the west coast of North America, as well as on the eastern side of the Appalachian Mountains of the United States. In each of these cases the weather systems are trapped vertically by stable stratifications, and laterally by Coriolis effects against the mountains. However, only the South African and the South American coastal disturbances are “coastal lows”; the remainder are generally produced by coastal ridging.

== See also ==
- Foehn wind
- Chinook wind
- Sirocco
- Bora (wind)
- Diablo wind
- Norte (wind)
- Katabatic wind
- Khamsin
- Oroshi
- Australian foehn winds
