= Elephanta =

Elephanta can mean:

- Elephanta (wind), a wind off the Malabar coast of India
- Elephanta Island, an island in Mumbai Harbour, India
- Elephanta Caves, cave temples on Elephanta Island
- Elephanta (comic), a 1977 Indian comic
