= Buran (wind) =

Type of wind or windstorm in Asia

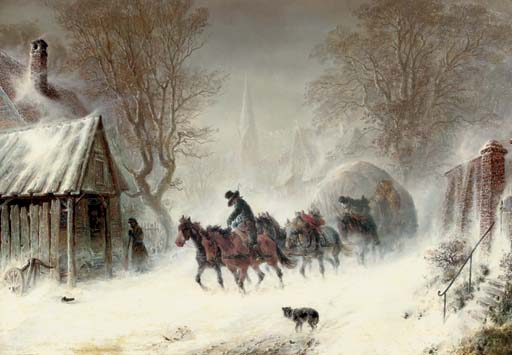

The buran (Persian: بوران, Russian: буран) is a wind which blows across Iran, eastern Asia, specifically Xinjiang, Siberia, and Kazakhstan. It is a wind of cold air, sometimes very strong, characteristic of the steppes of the Sarmatic Plain, to the west of the Urals.

The buran takes two forms: in summer, it is a hot, dry wind, whipping up sandstorms, while in winter, it is bitterly cold and often accompanied by blizzards. Winter buran winds are strong and full of ice and snow. The sky is often laden with snow, which swirls about and reduces the visibility to near zero at times. In Alaska this severe northeasterly wind is known as burga and brings snow and ice pellets.

The Soviet space programme named a class of spacecraft after the buran (see Buran programme).

== See also ==
- Dust storm
- N'aschi
- Shamal (wind)
