= Simoom =

Hot desert wind in Western Asia and other regions

Simoon
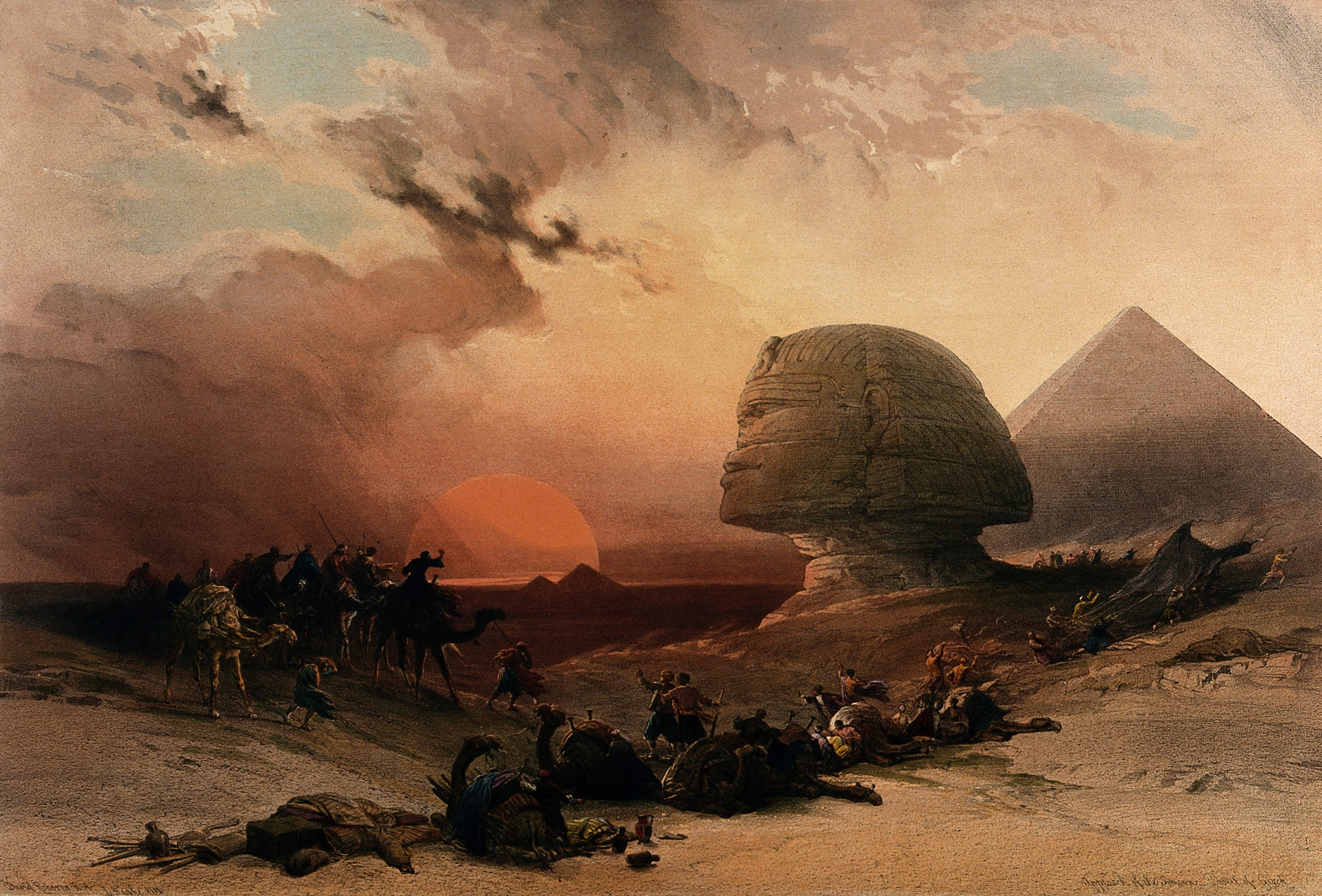
- Area of occurrence: Sahara, Egypt, Jordan, Syria, and the deserts of Arabian Peninsula
- Effect: Temperature may exceed 54 °C (129 °F) and the relative humidity may fall below 10%

Simoom or Saimum (Arabic: سموم samūm; from the root س م م s-m-m, سم "to poison") is a strong, hot, dry, dust-laden wind. The word is generally used to describe a local wind that blows in the Sahara, Jordan, Iraq, Syria, and the deserts of Arabian Peninsula. Its temperature may exceed 54 °C (129 °F) and the relative humidity may fall below 10%.

== Name ==
Alternative spellings include samoon, samun, simoun, and simoon. Another name used for this wind is samiel (Turkish samyeli from Arabic sāmm سامّ meaning poisonous and Turkish yel meaning wind). An alternative type occurring in the region of Central Asia is known as "Garmsil" (гармсель).

The name means "poison wind" and is given because the sudden onset of simoom may also cause heat stroke. This is attributed to the fact that the hot wind brings more heat to the body than can be disposed of by the evaporation of perspiration.

== Description ==
The Nuttall Encyclopædia described the simoom:

The storm moves in cyclone (circular) form, carrying clouds of dust and sand, and produces on humans and animals a suffocating effect.

A 19th-century account of simoom in Egypt reads:

Egypt is also subject, particularly during the spring and summer, to the hot wind called the "samoom," which is still more oppressive than the khamasin winds, but of much shorter duration, seldom lasting longer than a quarter of an hour or twenty minutes. It generally proceeds from the south-east or south-south-east, and carries with it clouds of dust and sand.

== In North America ==
It has been alleged that a "simoom" occurred on June 17, 1859, in Goleta and Santa Barbara, California. Local historian Walker Tompkins wrote that during the morning, the temperature hovered around the normal 24 to 27 °C (75 to 81 °F), but around 1pm, strong super hot winds filled with dust began to blow from the direction of the Santa Ynez Mountains to the north. By 2 pm, the temperature supposedly reached 56 °C (133 °F). This temperature was said to have been recorded by an official U.S. coastal survey vessel that was operating in the waters just offshore, in the Santa Barbara Channel. At 5 pm, the temperature had reportedly dropped to 50 °C (122 °F), and by 7 pm, the temperature was back to a normal 25 °C (77 °F). Tompkins provided a supposed quote from a U.S. government report saying, "Calves, rabbits and cattle died on their feet. Fruit fell from trees to the ground scorched on the windward side; all vegetable gardens were ruined. A fisherman in a rowboat made it to the Goleta Sandspit with his face and arms blistered as if he had been exposed to a blast furnace." Also according to Tompkins, local inhabitants were saved from the heat by seeking shelter in the thick adobe walled houses that were the standard construction at the time.

However, experts contest this account. UCSB Professor Joel Michaelsen, for instance, said:

I have never found any outside source to validate Tompkins' story, and I am highly skeptical of its veracity. I don't doubt that strong hot, dry downslope winds could kick up lots of dust and produce very high temperatures – but in the 110 F – 115 F range at most. The 133 F just isn't physically reasonable, as it would require the creation of an extremely hot air mass somewhere to the northeast. Last Monday's weather was a very good strong example of the sort of conditions that would produce such a heat wave, and our temperatures topped out at least 20 degrees below Tompkins' figure. Stronger winds could have increased the heating a bit, but not nearly that much. Add to all that meteorologically-based skepticism Tompkins' well-known tendency to mix liberal doses of fiction into his 'histories,' and I think you have a strong case for discounting this one.

Meteorologist Christopher C. Burt wrote about the alleged incident:

There is no record of who made this measurement or exactly where it was made in Santa Barbara. Some later sources say it was made on a U.S. coastal geo-survey vessel. If that is the case then the temperature is not possible since the waters off Santa Barbara in June are never warmer than about 70°F and any wind blowing over the ocean would have its temperature modified by the cool water no matter how hot the air. This report is singular and there is physical evidence (burnt crops and dead animals) that something amazing happened here this day, but the temperature record is impossible to validate."

== Figurative use of simoom ==
Edgar Allan Poe's short story "MS. Found in a Bottle" (1833) features a storm off the coast of Java, wherein "every appearance warranted me [the protagonist-narrator] in apprehending a Simoom."

In the political essay "Chartism", Thomas Carlyle argues that even the poorest of men who have resigned themselves to misery and toil cannot resign themselves to injustice because they retain an innate sense that a higher (divine) justice must govern the world: "Force itself, the hopelessness of resistance, has doubtless a composing effect against inanimate Simooms, and much other infliction of the like sort, we have found it suffice to produce complete composure. Yet one would say a permanent Injustice even from an Infinite Power would prove unendurable by men."

Walden (1854), by Henry David Thoreau, references a simoom; he uses it to describe his urge to escape something most unwanted. "There is no odor so bad as that which arises from goodness tainted. It is human, it is divine, carrion. If I knew for a certainty that a man was coming to my house with the conscious design of doing me good, I should run for my life, as from that dry and parching wind of the African deserts called the simoom, which fills the mouth and nose and ears and eyes with dust till you are suffocated, for fear that I should get some of his good done to me – some of its virus mingled with my blood. No – in this case I would rather suffer evil the natural way."

In his 1854 novel Hard Times, Charles Dickens in describing the oppressive midsummer heat of the sooty, smoky factories of Coketown, writes, "The atmosphere of those Fairy palaces was like the breath of the simoom; and their inhabitants, wasting with heat, toiled languidly in the desert" (book 2, chapter 1). In American Notes Dickens also describes "that injurious [political] Party Spirit" as "the Simoom of America, sickening and blighting everything of wholesome life within its reach."

In José Rizal's novel El filibusterismo (1891), a bitter and vengeful Crisóstomo Ibarra resurfaces as Simoun. His aim as Simoun is the overthrow of colonial rule in the Philippines, accomplished through the acceleration of already systemic abuse.

In Bram Stoker's novel Dracula (1897), Lucy, describing the appearance of Dracula in her room, writes in her journal entry on September 17 that "a whole myriad of little specks seemed to come blowing in through the broken window, and wheeling and circling round like the pillar of dust that travellers describe when there is a simoom in the desert."

In James Joyce's novel A Portrait of the Artist as a Young Man (1914), there is a reference to "Stephen's heart [withering] up like a flower of the desert that feels the simoom coming from afar."

In Sinclair Lewis' novel Main Street (1920), there is a reference to "Aunt Bessie's simoom of questioning."

In keeping with its tradition of naming its aircraft engines after winds, the Wright Aeronautical R-1200 of 1925 was called the Simoon.

A simoon strikes during chapter 2 of the film serial Tarzan the Tiger (1929).

In Making a President (1932), H. L. Mencken refers to "a veritable simoon of hiccups."

In House of Incest (1936), Anaïs Nin wrote: "Sabina's face was suspended in the darkness of the garden. From the eyes a simoun wind shrivelled the leaves and turned the earth over; all things which had run a vertical course now turned in circles, round the face, around HER face."

=== In contemporary culture ===
In Patrick O'Brian's novel Post Captain (1972), Diana Villiers' mentally troubled cousin, Edward Lowndes, upon learning that Doctor Maturin is a naval surgeon, remarks, "Very good – you are upon the sea but not in it: you are not an advocate for cold baths. The sea, the sea! Where should we be without it? Frizzled to a mere toast, sir; parched, desiccated by the simoom, the dread simoom."

A song titled "Simoon" features on the Yellow Magic Orchestra's eponymously titled album that was released in 1978. The Creatures have a song called "Simoom" on their 1989 album Boomerang, with lyrics such as "Simoom, simoom... you breathe in suffocation / Relentless simoom, blow and whistle this tune".

In the film The English Patient (1996) there is a scene in which Count László Almásy regales Katharine Clifton with histories of named winds, one of them being the "Simoon." Alluding to the records of Herodotus, Almásy tells Katharine that there was once a certain Arabic people who deemed the "Simoon" so evil that they marched out to meet it ranked as an army, "their swords raised."

In the collectible card game Magic: The Gathering, a card named "Simoon" first appeared in the Visions expansion set on a fictional continent of Jamuraa. This card saw play in the sideboard of contemporary Type II decks and was especially effective against the popular Five Colours Green decks that heavily relied on small creatures with toughness of 1.

== See also ==
- Haboob
- Nar as-samum
- Sirocco
