= Alizé =

Alizé is a French word meaning "trade wind".

Alizé or Alizée may also refer to:

== People ==
- Alizé (given name), female given name
- Alizée (stage name of Alizée Jacotey, born 1984), French singer
- Alizée (stage name of Zainab Ali-Nielsen, born c. 1986), Nigerian singer
- Annie Alizé (born 1955), French sprinter

== Aircraft ==
- Air France#Alizé, the premium economy offering of Air France
- Breguet Alizé, a 1950s French carrier-based anti-submarine warfare monoplane

== Other ==
- Aliza, name
- Alize 20, a French sailboat design
- Alizé (drink), an alcoholic drink produced by Kobrand Corporation and L & L
- Alizee (horse), Australian racehorse
- "L'Alizé", a 2000 single from the album Gourmandises by Alizée

== See also ==
- "Alizeh", a song by Pritam, Arijit Singh, Ash King and Shashwat Singh from the 2016 Indian film Ae Dil Hai Mushkil
- Alizeh Agnihotri, Indian actress
