= Diablo wind =

Northern California weather pattern

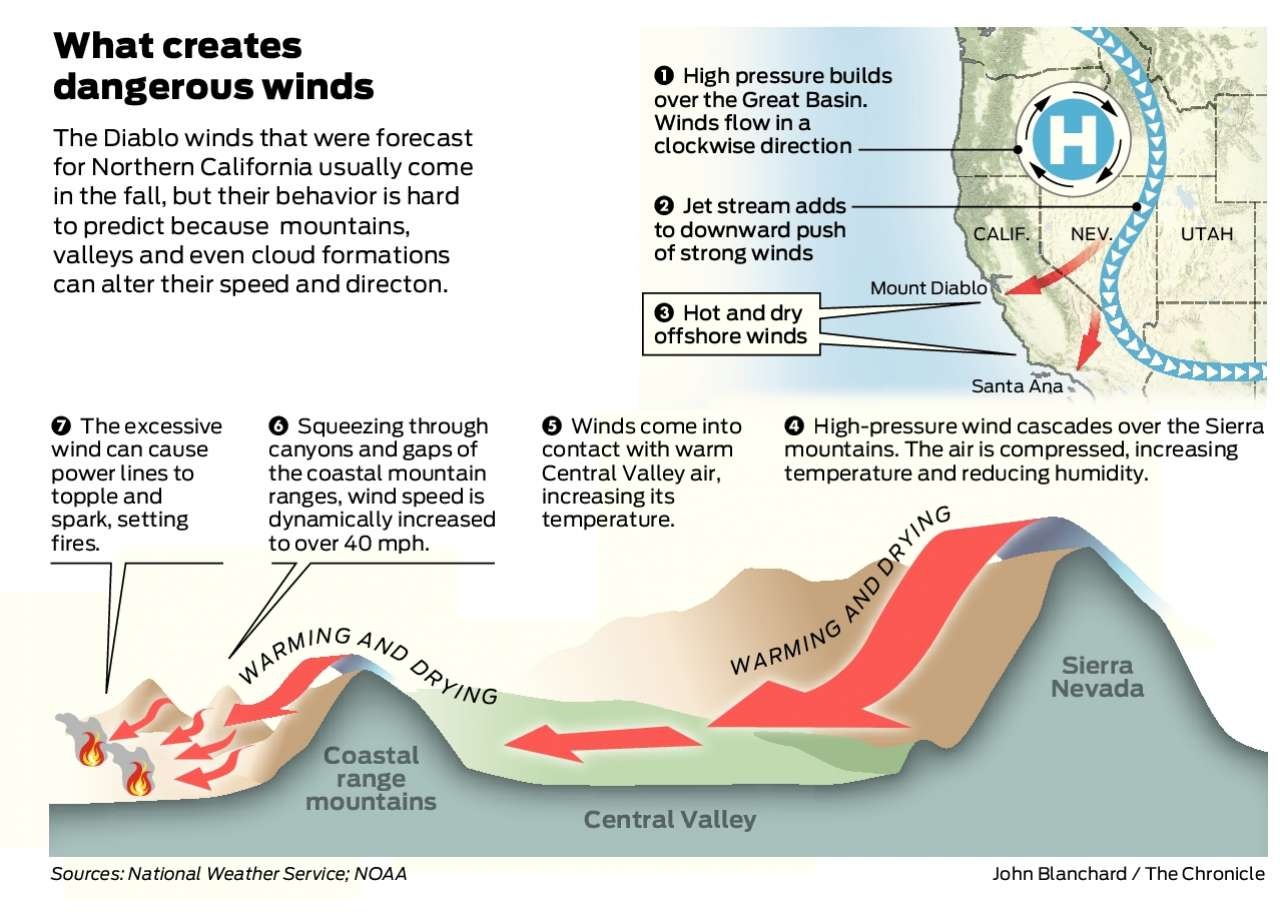
Explanation for the Diablo wind.

Diablo wind is a name that has been occasionally used for the hot, dry wind from the northeast that typically occurs in the San Francisco Bay Area of Northern California during the spring and fall although they may appear throughout the year.

Air flowing from high pressure systems over the Great Basin travels towards the lower pressure of the Northern California coast. This air is subjected to heating and humidity loss as it travels through the Central Valley before being channeled through the Diablo Mountain. The result is a pattern of fast, hot, and dry winds that pose a serious wildfire threat to the San Francisco Bay Area.

Diablo winds typically occur between 2 to 4 times a year, with events lasting an average of 15 hours and carrying speeds of 40 miles per hour (64 km/h) although notably strong incidents have been recorded at up to 70 miles per hour (110 km/h).

The same wind pattern also affects other parts of California's coastal ranges and the western slopes of Sierra Nevada, with many media and government groups using the term Diablo winds for strong, dry downslope wind over northern and central California.

== Name ==
The term first appeared shortly after the 1991 Oakland firestorm, perhaps to distinguish it from the comparable, and more familiar, hot dry wind in Southern California known as the Santa Ana winds. In fact, in decades previous to the 1991 fire, the term "Santa Ana" was occasionally used as well for the Bay Area dry northeasterly wind, such as the one that was associated with the 1923 Berkeley Fire.

The name "Diablo wind" refers to the fact that the wind blows into the inner Bay Area from the direction of Mount Diablo in adjacent Contra Costa County and evoking the fiery, sensationalist connotation inherent in "devil wind".

== Formation ==
There are many factors that contribute to the formation and severity of Diablo winds, making their formation and impact hard to predict. Generally, Diablo winds are created by a combination of a high pressure air system in The Great Basin (Nevada) and low pressure off the Northern California Coast. This disparity most commonly occurs in the Fall and Winter, as fast flowing polar jet streams move through the Great Basin region. This strong pressure difference between the two regions causes the systems to equalize, with air traveling westward from the Great Basin towards the low pressure of the San Francisco Bay Area Coast.

Flowing downwards from the high elevation, low pressure system of the Sierra Nevada Mountains to sea level, these winds compress under the increasing pressure. This results in compressional heating whereupon winds can warm as much as 20 °F (11 °C), and lose relative humidity. Winds also experience contact heating as they pass through the warm air of the Central Valley. From there, these winds are funneled through coastal mountain ranges, most notably, the Diablo Mountain Range where they can reach speeds exceeding 60 miles per hour (97 km/h) as they make their way through the San Francisco Bay Area before reaching the ocean.

=== Distinction From Santa Ana Winds ===
Because of the elevation of the coastal ranges in north-central California, the thermodynamic structure that occurs with the Diablo wind pattern favors the development of strong ridge-top and lee-side downslope winds associated with a phenomenon called the "hydraulic jump". While hydraulic jumps can occur with Santa Ana winds, the same thermodynamic structure that occurs with them typically favors "gap" flow more frequently. Santa Ana winds are katabatic, gravity-driven winds, draining air off the high deserts, while the Diablo-type wind originates mainly from strongly sinking air from aloft, pushed toward the coast by higher pressure aloft. Thus, Santa Anas are strongest in canyons, whereas a Diablo wind is first noted and blows strongest atop the various mountain peaks and ridges around the Bay Area.

In both cases, as the air sinks, it heats up by compression and its relative humidity drops. This warming is in addition to, and usually greater than, any contact heating that occurs as the air stream crosses the Central Valley and the Diablo Valley. This is the reverse of the normal summertime weather pattern in which an area of low pressure (called the California Thermal Low) rather than high pressure lies east of the Bay Area, drawing in cooler, more humid air from the ocean.

The severity, duration, and frequency of Diablo winds differs greatly from Santa Ana winds. Diablo winds are noticeably rarer than their southern counterpart, with roughly 2 to 4 events occurring annually, compared to the 10 to 25 Santa Ana wind events that Southern California experiences. With recorded wind speeds of over 60 miles per hour (97 km/h) typically lasting 15 hours, Diablo winds tend to be weaker than Santa Ana winds which reach speeds exceeding 80 miles per hour (130 km/h) and generally lasting between one and seven days.

== Impacts ==
The high humidity of the San Francisco Bay Area provided by its Marine layer makes it noticeably susceptible to these hot and drying winds. As the Diablo winds move towards sea level, they erode this marine layer, displacing and warming the air mass over the coastline. This erosion possibly plays a larger role than even compressional heating in the warming of this region.

Effects tend to be halved at farther southern coasts, and even can spawn Sundowner winds in Santa Barbara. Although Santa Ana winds may recur, Diablo events in autumn tend to precede Santa Ana wind events by a few weeks with a lull in between as solar incidence declines. Southern Californian coasts from Ventura County south are generally unaffected by Diablo events.

=== Wildfires ===
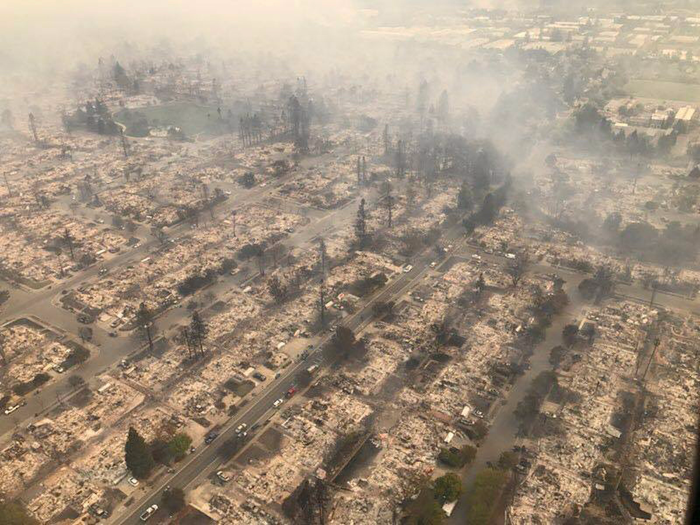
Aerial view of the Coffey Park neighborhood in the aftermath of the Tubbs Fire, October 8, 2017.

The dry offshore wind, already strong because of the offshore pressure gradient, can become quite strong, particularly along and in the lee of the ridges of the Coast Range. This effect is especially dangerous with respect to wildfires as it can enhance the updraft generated by the heat in such fires. While the Diablo wind pattern can occur in any season, it is most dangerous in the fall, when vegetation is at its driest. These winds accelerate the drying of these live fuels when they tend to already be at their driest and by extension, increase their susceptibility to ignition. California's predominantly Mediterranean climate has an extended dry period from May through October. Beyond the directly fanning flames during wildfires and drying live fuels, these winds also threaten to topple electrical networks in the Bay Area, posing another wildfire threat. When winds are particularly strong, such as in October 2026, this concern can even warrant deliberately cutting off power to thousands within the Bay Area.

Many of California’s most destructive wildfires, such as the Tubbs Fire in October 2017, at the time, the most destructive fire in California history, have been linked to Diablo wind activity. Beginning in Castaloga, California, strong Diablo winds carried the initial flames over 20 kilometres (12 mi) away to Santa Rosa within 4 hours of ignition. Other notable fires caused in part by Diablo winds include the 1991 Oakland Tunnel Fire and the October 2017 Northern California wildfires (of which, the Tubbs Fire is one). Notably, these events occurred in October, when Northern California experiences the highest frequency of Diablo wind events.

== See also ==
- Santa Ana wind
- Foehn wind
- Katabatic wind
- Norte (wind)
- Sundowner wind
- Hydraulic jump
- Dine's compensation
- Thermal low
- Relative humidity
