= Leste =

The Leste is a hot, dry, easterly wind of the Madeira and Canary Islands.

== Description ==
It is similar to the Leveche. It blows from an easterly direction in autumn, winter and spring, rarely in summer, and is of intense dryness, sometimes reducing the relative humidity at Funchal to below 20%. The Leste is commonly accompanied by clouds of fine red sand.

== See also ==
- List of local winds
