= Bohemian wind =

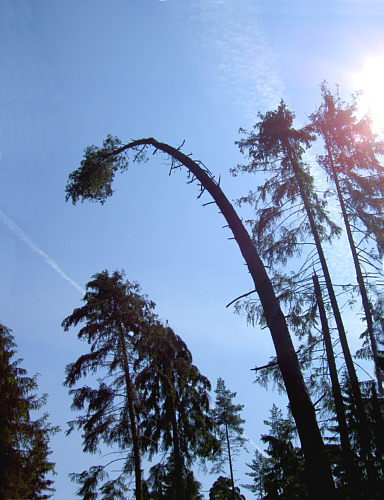
Trees bent by the böhm

The Bohemian wind or böhm (German: Böhmwind or Böhmischer Wind) is a katabatic downslope wind, which occurs in East Bavaria, eastern Upper Franconia, the Vogtland, the Ore Mountains, Upper Lusatia, the Sudetes and the Austrian Granite and Gneiss Highland. It is associated with gusty, dry winds and low temperatures. The böhm carries hazy, often slightly dusty air from the Bohemian Basin.

== See also ==
- List of local winds

== Literature ==
- Johannes Goldschmidt: Das Klima von Sachsen. Akademie-Verlag, Berlin 1950. In: Abhandlungen des Meteorologischen Dienstes der DDR. No. 3.
- H. Pleiß: Die Windverhältnisse in Sachsen. Akademie-Verlag, Berlin 1951. In: Abhandlungen des Meteorologischen Dienstes der DDR. No. 6.
- Klima und Witterung im Erzgebirge. Akademie-Verlag, Berlin 1973. In: Abhandlungen des Meteorologischen Dienstes der DDR. No. 104.
