= Carpinteiro =

Carpinteiro is an occupational surname literally meaning "carpenter" in Portuguese and Galician languages. Notable people with this surname include:

- José Manuel Carpinteiro, Portuguese sports shooter
- Margarida Carpinteiro, Portuguese actress and writer
- José Jefferson Carpinteiro Peres (1932–2008), commonly known as Jefferson Peres, Brazilian professor and politician
