= Sukhovey =

Sukhovey (Russian: Суховей, translates to dry wind) is a wind with high temperature and low relative humidity occurring in the steppes, the semi-deserts and the deserts of Kazakhstan and the Caspian region.

The speed of sukhovey is usually moderate 5 to 20 m/s. Relative humidity is less than 30%. Sukhovey emanates from the periphery of anticyclones in summer predominantly with the intrusion of the tropical masses of air (analogous to khamsin, sirocco and other). At a high air temperature (20–25 °C and above) the sukhovey causes strongly increasing evaporation from the soils.

The low mobility of anticyclones causes the steady duration of the sukhovey over several days, which with the insufficient soil moisture causes drought, spoiling of the harvests of cereal and fruit crops, loss of plants. The warm and dry air masses originate above the deserts of Africa, Asia Minor, and also in South Kazakhstan, and with them sukhoveys are extended to the wooded plains of Russia and Kazakhstan, but more frequently they invade the semi-deserts and the steppes.

Historically, these winds have been a major impediment to large-scale sedentary agriculture in Central Asia.

== Interest facts ==
On 4 June 2014 sukhovey was registered in Moscow for the first time in last 60 years.
