= Vendavel =

The Vendavel (also spelled Vendaval or Vendevale) is a stormy southwesterly wind that affects the southern Mediterranean coast of Spain and the Strait of Gibraltar, blowing from the Atlantic into the western Mediterranean Sea. It is the westerly counterpart of the easterly Levanter.

== Meteorology ==
The Vendavel is associated with low-pressure systems (travelling depressions) advancing into the Mediterranean from the Atlantic, and is frequently accompanied by thunderstorms and violent squalls. It occurs mainly in the cool season, with the highest frequency from October to November and from February to March. Historically, sailing directions warned that the approach of a vendaval was marked by an easterly wind veering to the southeast, followed by an obscured sky and concealed coastline.

== Etymology ==
The name derives from Old French vent d'aval ("wind from the lowlands", i.e. from seaward), borrowed into Spanish, Portuguese, Galician and Catalan as vendaval; the term is attested in Iberian sources from the 14th century.

== Other usage ==
In Spanish historical and nautical sources relating to the Philippines, vendaval (or its plural vendavales) was applied to the southwesterly winds of the southwest monsoon—the season known in Filipino as Habagat—which blows from roughly May or June through October and historically impeded the Manila galleon trade.
