= Alizé (given name) =

Alizé, or Alizée, is a female given name, taken from the word alizé, describing an intertropical trade wind. It has the variants Alysée, Alisée and Aliséa. The name is common in French-speaking countries. Alizay is another variation of the name.

The name gained rapid popularity in the 1980s.

People with this given name include:

- Alizée (born 1984), born Alizée Jacotey, French singer
- Alizé Cornet (born 1990), a French tennis player
- Alizée Baron (born 1992), French skier
- Alizée Brien (born 1993), Canadian racing cyclist
- Alizée Costes (born 1994), a French rhythmic gymnast
- Alizée Crozet (born 2000), French figure skater
- Alizée Dufraisse (born 1987), a French rock climber
- Alizée Gaillard (born 1985), a Swiss model
- Alize Lily Mounter (born 1988), Welsh journalist and beauty queen
- Alizé Lim (born 1990), a French tennis player
- Alizé Mack (born 1997), American football player
- Alizée Poulicek (born 1987), a Belgian model
