= Tsiokantimo =

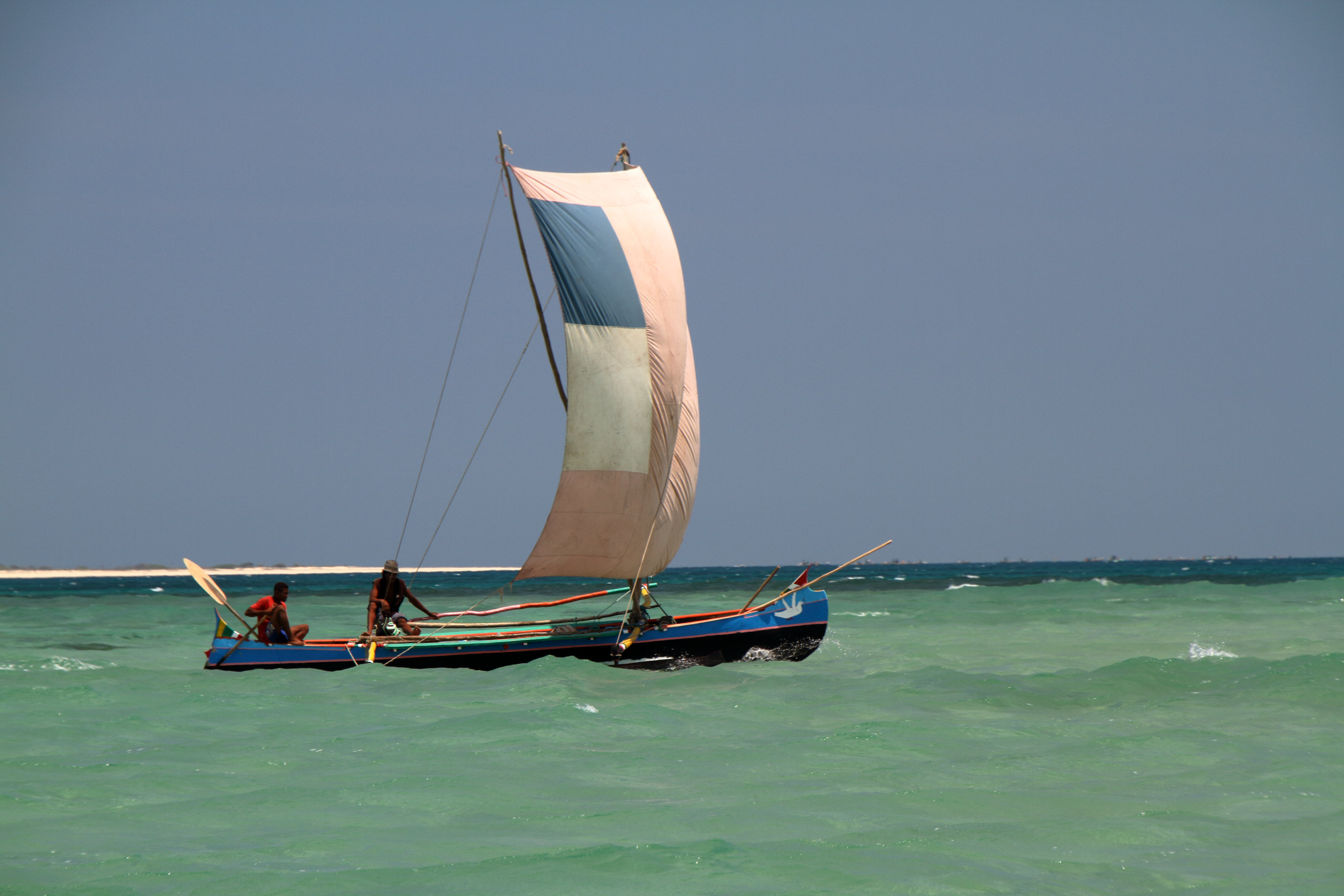
Sea wind hitting sailors on Toliara Bay.

The Tsiokantimo (or Tsiokatimo) is a strong south wind that blows in the southwest region of Madagascar, usually from August to September. This wind hits the vast stretches of predominantly sandy coastline, causing wind erosion of the soil, and bringing a lot of dust to the city of Toliara (formerly Tulear) in Madagascar, but also the anchovies that are pushed by the current and waves in the Tulear lagoon.

== Popular culture ==
In the Malagasy culture, it is believed that the Tsiokantimo rises because of the death of a Vezo fisherman.

== Bibliography ==
- Fanony, Fulgence (1984). Tsiokantimo: vent du sud (in French). Paris: Institut national des langues et civilisations orientales. p. 173.
