= Jefferson Peres =

Brazilian politician

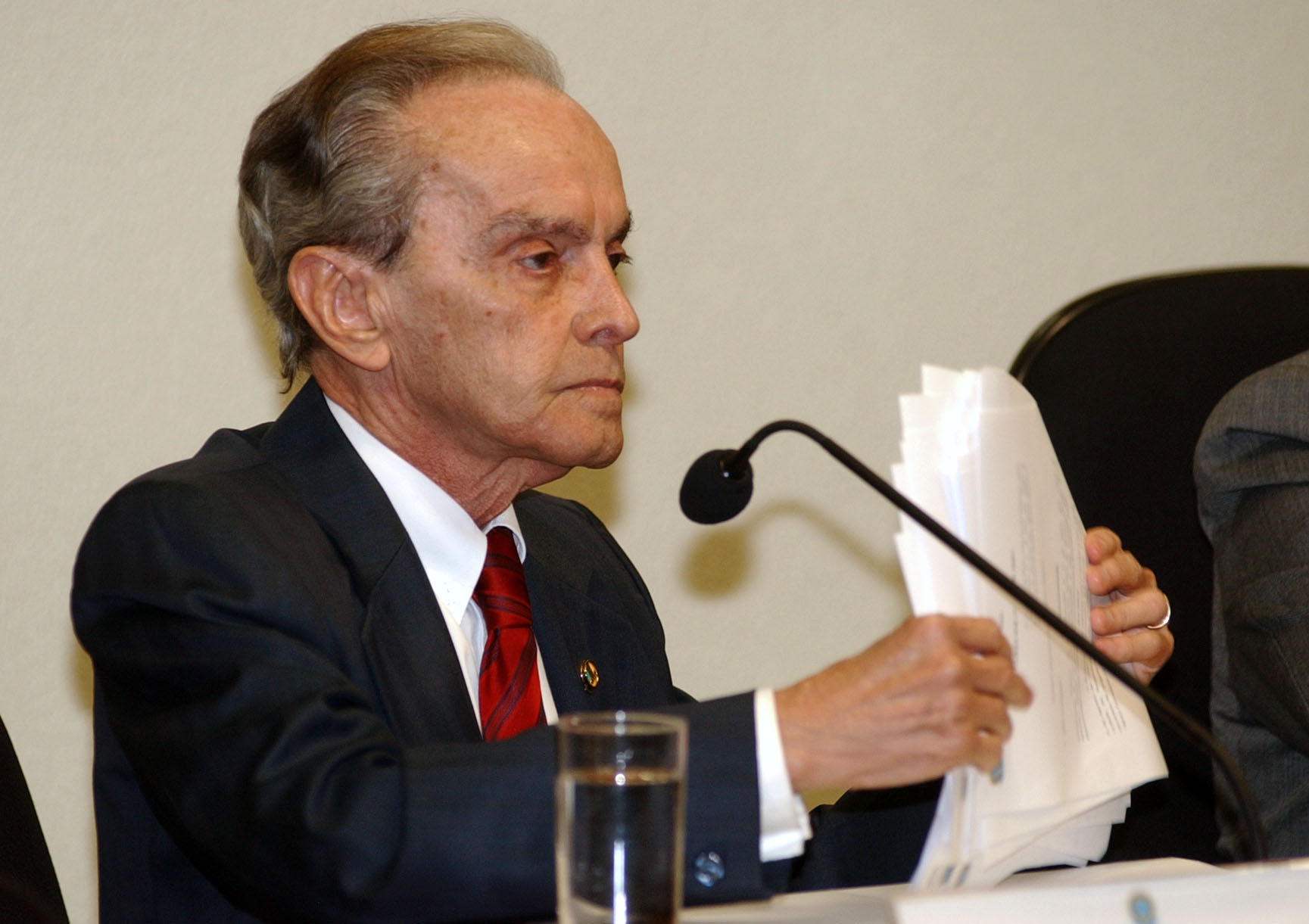

Senator from Amazonas
- In office February 1, 1995 – May 23, 2008

Personal details
- Born: 18 March 1932
- Died: 23 May 2008 (aged 76)
- Party: PDT
- Jefferson Peres's voice Recorded on 22 November 2005

José Jefferson Carpinteiro Peres (18 March 1932 – 23 May 2008), commonly known as Jefferson Peres, was a Brazilian professor and politician and a member of the Brazilian Senate (Senado Federal).

== Career ==
In the 2006 presidential election, Peres was the vice-presidential candidate for the Democratic Labour Party (PDT), supporting Cristovam Buarque's presidential candidacy.

Péres was involved in a popular movement to nationalize the oil industry in Brazil in the 1950s.

He opposed the reconstruction of the BR-319 highway through Brazil's rain forest. He called for the replacement of the "wholly artificial" Manaus industrial park (which exists in part because of tax incentives) with production of goods from local raw materials.

In 1988 he became the councilman of Manaus and held that position until he was elected to the Senate in 1994.

Outside politics Peres was dean of the Universidade Federal do Amazonas School of Social Studies in the 1970s. He taught economics in the same institution.
