= Brisote =

Brisote (also brisole) is the northeast trade wind over Cuba when it is blowing more strongly than usual. The typical strength of this wind is 9 m s^{−1}; anything blowing at a stronger rate may be described as a brisote. A brisote may be associated with tropical cyclones passing north-east of the island.
