= Khamsin =

Local name for a dry, hot wind in Egypt and the Levant

Khamsin in hieroglyphs
r Y1 P5 X1 Z4 Z2
Resetyu
Rstyw
The south winds
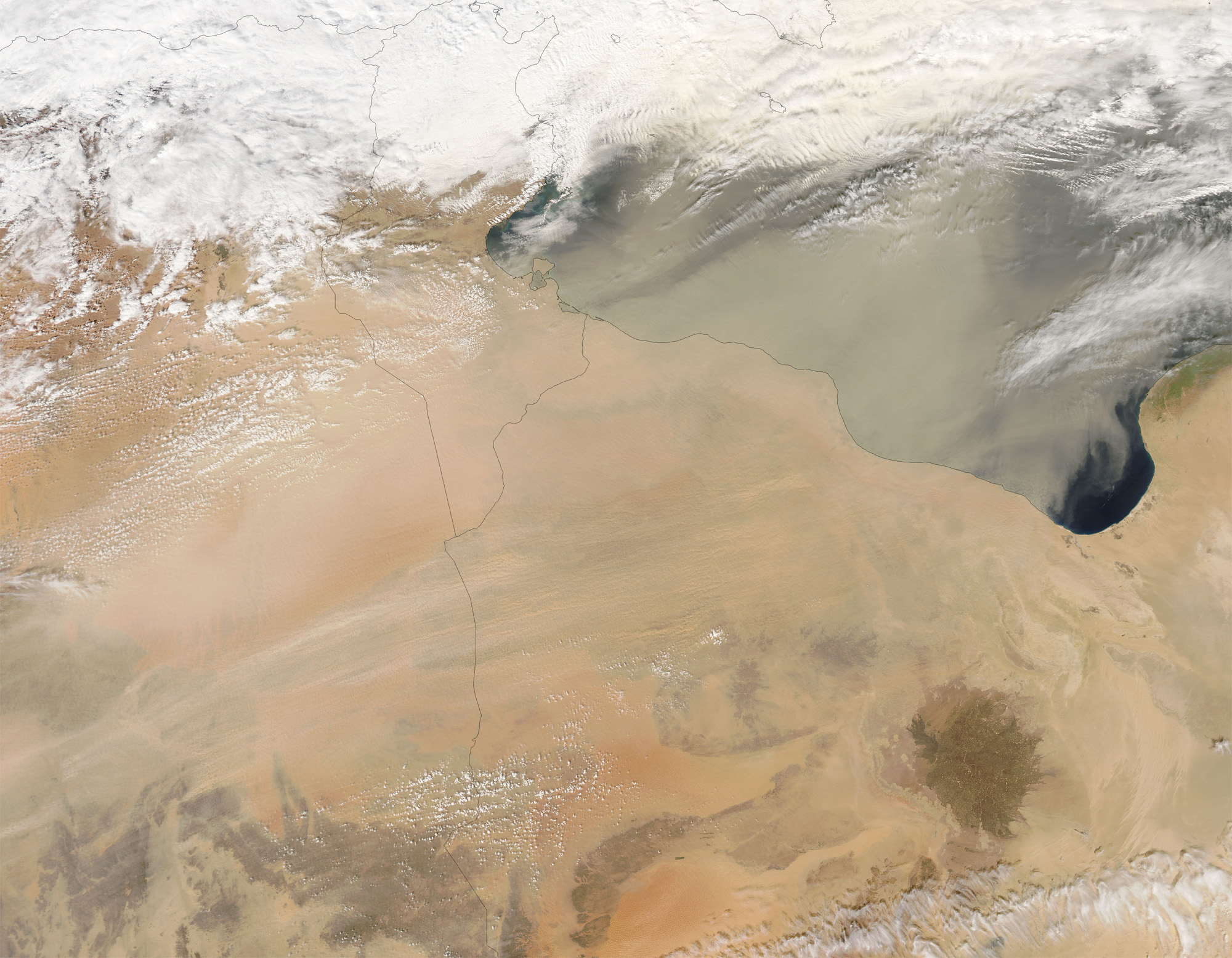
- Dust storm over Libya (NASA/EOS)

Khamsin, chamsin or hamsin (Arabic: خمسين ḫamsīn, meaning "fifty"), more commonly known in Egypt, Israel and Palestine as khamaseen (Egyptian Arabic: خماسين ḫamāsīn, IPA: [xɑmæˈsiːn]), is a dry, hot, sandy local wind affecting Egypt and the Levant; similar winds, blowing in other parts of North Africa, the Arabian Peninsula and the entire Mediterranean basin, have different local names, such as bad-i-sad-o-bist roz in Iran and Afghanistan, haboob in the Sudan, aajej in southern Morocco, ghibli in Tunis, harmattan in the western Maghreb, africo in Italy, sirocco (derived from the Arabic šarqiyya, "eastern") which blows in winter over much of the Middle East, and simoom.

From the Arabic word for "fifty", these dry, sand-filled windstorms blow sporadically in Egypt typically after fifty days from the start of spring, hence the name. The term is also used in the southern Levant (Jordan, Israel, Palestine), where the phenomenon takes a partly different form and blows both during spring and autumn.

When the storm passes over an area, lasting for several hours, it carries great quantities of sand and dust from the deserts, with a speed up to 140 kilometers per hour (87 mph; 76 knots), and the humidity in that area drops below 5%. Even in winter, the temperatures rise above 45 °C (113 °F) due to the storm. The sand storms are reported to have seriously impeded both Napoleon's military campaigns in Egypt as well as Allied-German fighting in North Africa in World War II.

In the southern Levant it takes the shape of an oppressive weather front with hot temperatures, large quantities of dust impeding visibility, and strong winds during the night. In the Book of Exodus of the Hebrew Bible, the ruah kadim (רוח קדים) or "east wind" is the cause of the parting of the Red Sea (Exodus 14:21).

== Causes ==
Khamsin can be triggered by extratropical cyclones that move eastwards along the southern parts of the Mediterranean or along the North African coast from February to June.

== Regional aspects ==
=== Egypt ===
==== Characteristics ====
In Egypt, the khamsin usually arrives in April but occasionally can occur between March and May, carrying great quantities of sand and dust from the deserts, with a speed up to 140 kilometers per hour, and a rise of temperatures as much as 20 °C (36 °F) in two hours. It is believed to blow "at intervals for about 50 days", although it rarely occurs "more than once a week and lasts for just a few hours at a time". A 19th-century account of the khamsin in Egypt reports that

These winds, though they seldom cause the thermometer of Fahrenheit to rise above 95° in Lower Egypt, or in Upper Egypt 105°, are dreadfully oppressive, even to the natives. When the plague visits Egypt, it is generally in the spring; and the disease is most severe in the period of the khamáseen.

The same account relates that Muslims in Egypt "calculate the period of [khamaseen] ... to commence on the day immediately following the Coptic festival of Easter Sunday, and to terminate on the Day of Pentecost (or Whitsunday); an interval of forty-nine days." This period roughly coincides with the Jewish Counting of the Omer, which also lasts for an interval of 49 days, between the springtime feasts of Pesach (Passover) and Savuot (Weeks), as well as the Christian Eastertide which Copts also refer to as khamaseen.

==== In history ====
During Napoleon's 1798 Egyptian Campaign, the French soldiers had a hard time with the khamsin: when the storm appeared "as a blood[y] tint in the distant sky", the Ottomans went to take cover, while the French "did not react until it was too late, then choked and fainted in the blinding, suffocating walls of dust". During the North African Campaign in World War II,

Allied and German troops were several times forced to halt in mid-battle because of sandstorms caused by the khamsin... Grains of sand whirled by the wind blinded the soldiers and created electrical disturbances that rendered compasses useless.

=== Israel and Palestinian Territories ===
The word khamsin is considered a recent import to Palestine, probably introduced during the Mandate for Palestine period by British soldiers who had served in Egypt. Here the khamsin (חמסין) is more often known as simoom (سموم) by the Arabic speaking population, or by the Modern Hebrew name sharav (שרב) by Hebrew speakers.

Khamsin and sharav are scientifically defined as different phenomena, a sharav having three characteristics: a temperature higher than 27°C, a temperature exceeding the annual average by at least 5°C, and humidity levels 10% lower than normal. However, this usage is strictly academic, and the two terms are used interchangeably by common speakers of Hebrew.

For information about the period when the khamsin affects Palestine, see above under "Egypt" (Counting of the Omer, the 49 days between the festivals of Passover and Shavuot).

== Cultural references ==
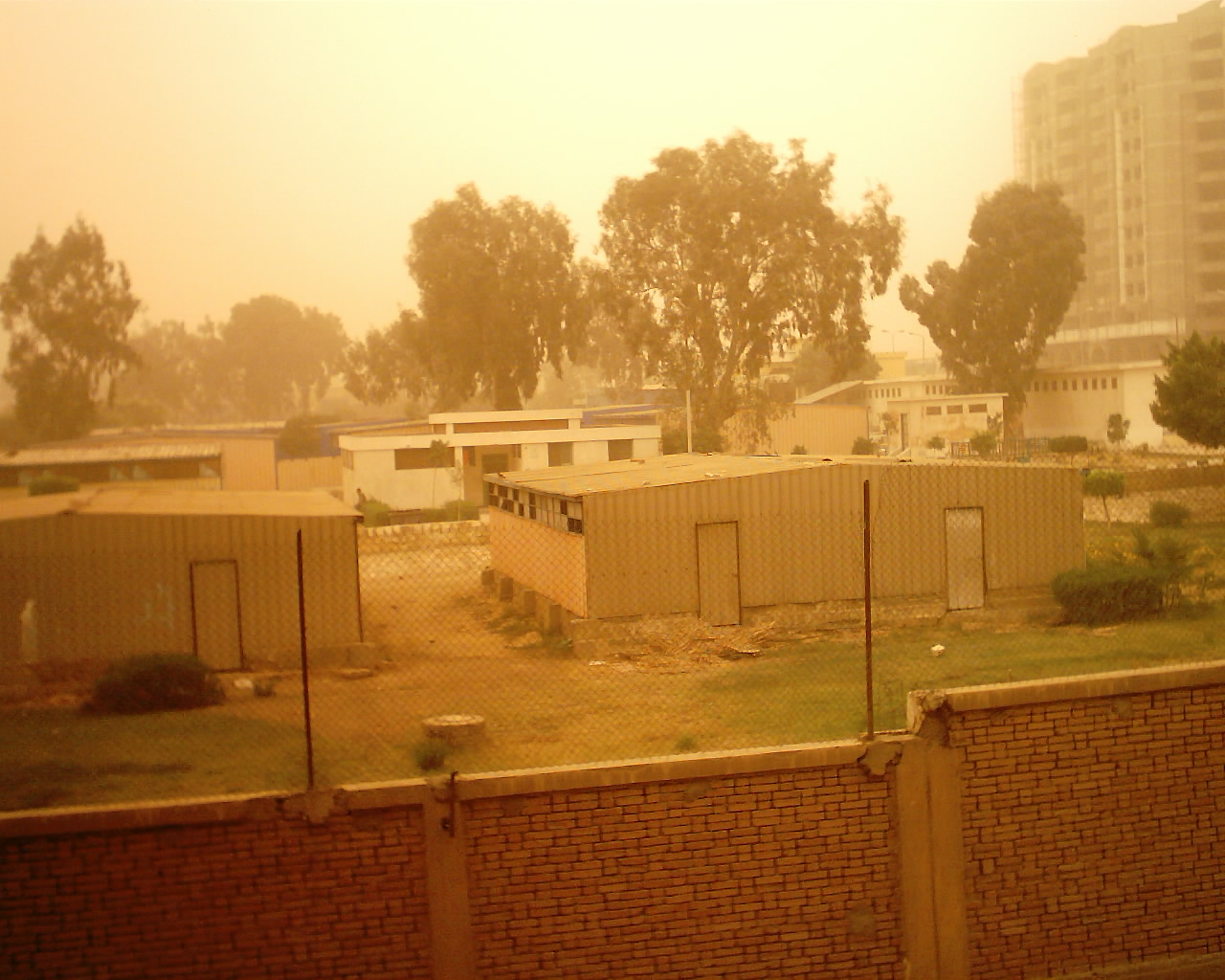
Khamsin in Egypt in 2007

- In the book Warlock in the Ancient Egyptian series by Wilbur Smith, Nefer, Taita and Mintaka have to hide in a cave until this storm passes whilst escaping the Hyksos.
- Khamsin was the name of a magazine published during the 1970s and 1980s by a group of Israeli Middle Eastern exiles in Europe, including members of Matzpen.
- Khamsin was the title of a 1982 Israeli film about a clash between a Jewish landowner and his Arab workers in a small farming village in the Galilee. The film was selected by the Israeli Film Board as their nominee for the Academy Award for best foreign-language film in 1983.
- The Alexandria Quartet by Lawrence Durrell also has a vivid description of the Khamsin.
- "Khamsin" is the name of the third movement of the composition Warm Winds, recorded by the Hollywood Saxophone Quartet in the 1950s.
- "Khamsin" was the codename of one of the characters from the video game Metal Gear Rising: Revengeance.
- "Khamsin" was the name of a Flame Haze in the anime, Shakugan no Shana.
- In the video game Golden Sun: Dark Dawn, Khamsin is the French name given to the Jupiter Djinni Sirocco.
- The Maserati Khamsin is a grand tourer produced by Maserati between 1974 and 1982.
- In The Adventures of Tintin, in the volume Land of Black Gold, Tintin, his dog Snowy and the twin detectives Thomson & Thompson face this storm.
- The Khamsin appears as a mythological creature in the Spanish comic series A Través del Khamsin, created by Skizocrilian Studio and published by Norma Editorial between 2013 and 2016.

== See also ==
- Haboob
- Harmattan
- Sand storm
