= Gilavar =

Gilavar is a name of the warm southern wind which blows across eastern Azerbaijan throughout the year, particularly in Baku and Shamakhi. Gilavar is one of the two main winds that dominate Baku, along with Khazri, the cold northern wind. The etymology of its name comes from the Tat language spoken in eastern Azerbaijan. In Tati, the word gilə means "grain/drop", and "var" means wind.
