= Wind of 120 days =

Strong summer wind in the east and southeast of the Iranian Plateau

The 120-day wind or wind of 120 days (Persian: باد صد و بیست روزه, romanized: bād sad ve bist ruzeh, lit. 'one hundred and twenty days wind') is a strong summer wind occurring from late May to late September in the east and southeast of the Iranian Plateau, particularly the Sistan Basin. It is so called because it lasts for four months. The typical wind speed is 30–40 kilometres per hour (19–25 mph) or less, but it can occasionally exceed 100–110 kilometres per hour (60–70 mph). The topography surrounding the region causes these high wind speeds. The wind moves fairly consistently south-to-southeastward; along with the shamal, it is one of two well-known winds in Iran.

During the "depression of Sistan", the four months when the wind is strongest, winds from northern Afghanistan and from the deserts of eastern Iran and western Afghanistan combine, resulting in accelerated high-pressure winds blowing from the central Iranian deserts toward Sistan and Baluchestan Province. The 120-day wind affects all of the Helmand Basin, but Sistan receives stronger winds as they intensify between the mountains of Iran and Afghanistan. The wind is relatively hot and carries abrasive sand particles. It causes evaporation in the Sistan Basin, contributing to drought in the region.

== Environmental impact ==
=== Wind intensity ===
Flora in the Sistan Basin is negatively affected by the intensity of the 120-day wind and by blown sand associated with it. The wind can reach speeds of 10 metres per second (36 km/h; 22 mph) at 10 metres (33 ft) above ground level and up to 20 metres per second (72 km/h; 45 mph) 300–500 metres (1,000–1,600 ft) above ground level. This can have a significant effect on crop transpiration. Natural formations, such as gorges, act as shelters or blockades to protect flora. A gorge on the northwest border of the region provides protection for palm groves used by people in the area.

The wind has the potential to cause breaches in dams on the Helmand River, leading to flooding. If river levels are too low, this can also contribute to drought. Sistan and Baluchestan Province reaps some benefits from the wind, including the elimination of stagnant water.

=== Dust storms and drought ===
The region experiences continuous dust storm activity due to loose soil around wetlands and lakes being blown by the 120-day wind. A severe drought from 1999 to 2001 transformed Lake Hāmūn into a desert; it remains one of the major sources of dust in the region. Droughts and their duration directly affect the regularity and intensity of dust storms.

Loose sands displaced by wind create yardangs and dune fields in the lower Helmand Basin. The moving sands intrude on villages in the province. Wind-blown sand threatens to invade fields and orchards, which jeopardizes agriculture and affects irrigation patterns. Windbreaks have been constructed to keep the sand from being removed from lake beds during droughts.

=== Helmand Valley ===
The Helmand River is the primary water source in the Sistan Basin. Without it, life in the area would be almost impossible. In the Helmand delta, flooding is common and can be a greater hazard than dust storms.

Sistan is generally avoided during summer; there are villages in the Helmand River delta, but most inhabitants are nomadic. Fauna is also scarce, though migratory birds do pass through.

== Architectural impact ==
In historic times, Sistan inhabitants prepared for possible disasters caused by the 120-day wind—dust, droughts, dry weather—by constructing buildings with extended walls and by placing buildings parallel to the wind. Inscriptions and architectural details became important with the development of baked brick buildings. Upper parts of buildings and minarets were not affected by wind-blown sands, but the lower portions were vulnerable: the wind is more intense near ground level, causing more structural erosion. Surfaces of buildings up to 10–15 feet (3.0–4.6 m) above ground level were smoothed by these conditions.

During these four months, the winds also bring higher temperatures. Small intakes on top of homes allow residents to use the 120-day wind as air conditioning.
