= Loo (wind) =

Hot, summer wind

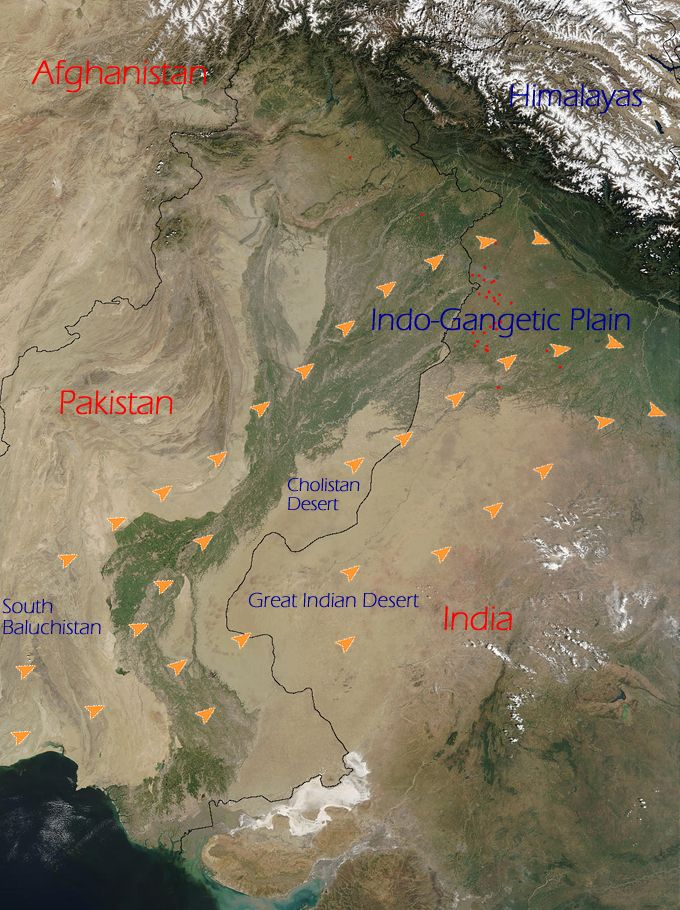
The path of the Loo (orange arrows) from the deserts of the Indian subcontinent towards and through the Indo-Gangetic Plain of India and Pakistan

The Loo (IPA: [luː]) is a strong, dusty, gusty, hot and dry summer wind from the west which blows over the Indo-Gangetic Plain region of North India and Pakistan. It is especially strong in the months of May and June. Due to its very high temperatures (45 °C–50 °C or 115 °F–120 °F), exposure to it often leads to fatal heatstrokes.

Since it causes extremely low humidity and high temperatures, the Loo also has a severe drying effect on vegetation leading to widespread browning in the areas affected by it during the months of May and June.

== Origin and ending ==
The Loo mainly originates in the large desert regions of the northwestern parts in the indian subcontinent: the Great Indian Desert, the Cholistan Desert and the desert areas of Southern Balochistan.

The Loo ends in late summer, with the arrival of the Indian monsoon. In some areas of North India and Pakistan, there are brief but violent dust storms known as Kali Andhi (or black Storm) before the monsoon sets in. The arrival of monsoon clouds in any location is frequently accompanied with cloudbursts, and the sudden transformation of the landscape from brown to green can seem "astonishing" as a result of the ongoing deluge and the abrupt cessation of the Loo.

== Dwelling adaptation ==
Since the plains of North India and Pakistan are both very hot and extremely dry during this season, water evaporates quite readily. Although this leads to the drying out of many ponds and lakes, the extreme dryness of the air is also easily exploited to create evaporation-based cooling systems. Windows shielded with fiber-screens of the fragrant khas (ख़स/خس or vetiver) dry-grass that are kept damp with a simple water-pumping mechanism are quite effective as an inexpensive form of air conditioning, and have been in common use throughout the plain portions of the northern Indian subcontinent for centuries. Because evaporation proceeds at a very rapid rate in the extreme dryness, the cooling effect can be quite dramatic and result in dwellings where the interior feels chilly. The water in the screens evaporates very rapidly, however, so it must constantly be replenished from raised tanks or with pumps (that can sometimes be driven by the Loo itself). Any water reservoir used must also be shielded from the Loo and the sun, or it can rapidly be depleted.

== Ecological effects ==
Many birds and animals succumb to the Loo in the summer months, especially in deforested areas where the Loo blows unhindered and shelter is unavailable. Certain insect-borne diseases, such as malaria, have historically registered dips during the Loo season as insects populations also plummet during this season. Even prior to the 1897 discovery that mosquitoes transmitted malaria, officials in Asia had noticed the strong winds in the plains of Northernmost India naturally made the region relatively free of the disease.

== In popular culture ==
Due to the dangerous, and potentially fatal, effects of the loo on vegetation, humans and animals, it is sometimes referred to as an evil wind in popular Indo-Pakistani culture. Avoiding exposure to the Loo is strongly recommended for children and the elderly, as well as pets. Most people attempt to stay indoors as much as possible during afternoons in the Loo-affected months. Heatstrokes are commonly referred to as loo lagna (Hindi: लू लगना, Urdu: لُو لگنا) being stricken by the Loo. Certain sharbats, which are popularly believed to have a cooling effect on the body and provide some protection against Loo-caused heatstrokes, are widely consumed during the Loo-season. These include sherbets of rose, khus-khus, shahtoot, bel and phalsa. A specific Unani recipe called Rooh Afza combines several of these popularly believed cooling agents, and is sold commercially as a syrup to flavor sherbets, cold milk drinks, ices and cold desserts, such as the popular falooda. Lassi, a yogurt-based drink of North India and Pakistan, is also extremely popular and believed to confer some protection against the Loo. Additionally in the desert state of Rajasthan Kairi Ka Panna (Hindi: कैरी का पन्ना) (drink of raw/unripe mango) is a very popular way of remaining cool and resilient to Loo.
