= Dines' compensation =

Dines' compensation, or Dines compensation principle, is a rule of thumb devised by English meteorologist William Henry Dines which states that winds converging on a given column of air at one altitude tends to be balanced by winds diverging at another altitude, and vice versa. As an example, the air under a thunderstorm rushes in at ground level, rises up through the cumulonimbus cloud, and then disperses at the top of the cloud so there is a balancing of converging and diverging air flows and no net increase in air molecules above a given location.

Dines compensation is a demonstration of conservation of mass under the weak constraint that the height of the atmosphere is approximately the same anywhere on Earth.

Mathematically it may be stated that the sign of the horizontal divergence changes at least once in any given column of air.

A corollary is that rising air at any given point in the atmosphere tends to be balanced by sinking or subsiding air elsewhere. This is a salient feature of mesoscale atmospheric circulation (i.e. supercells) and in macroscale and mesoscale tropical circulations. For instance, it is not uncommon to see high altitude anticyclonic cirrus outflow from a hurricane in visible satellite imagery which is compensating for the inbound winds at sea level.

Dines compensation is useful in weather forecasting to connect the formation and movement of ground-level high and low pressure zones with wind phenomenon in the upper troposphere such as Rossby waves and jet streams. In general Dines compensation ties together vertical and horizontal air movements in the atmosphere.
