= Harmattan =

West African dry weather season

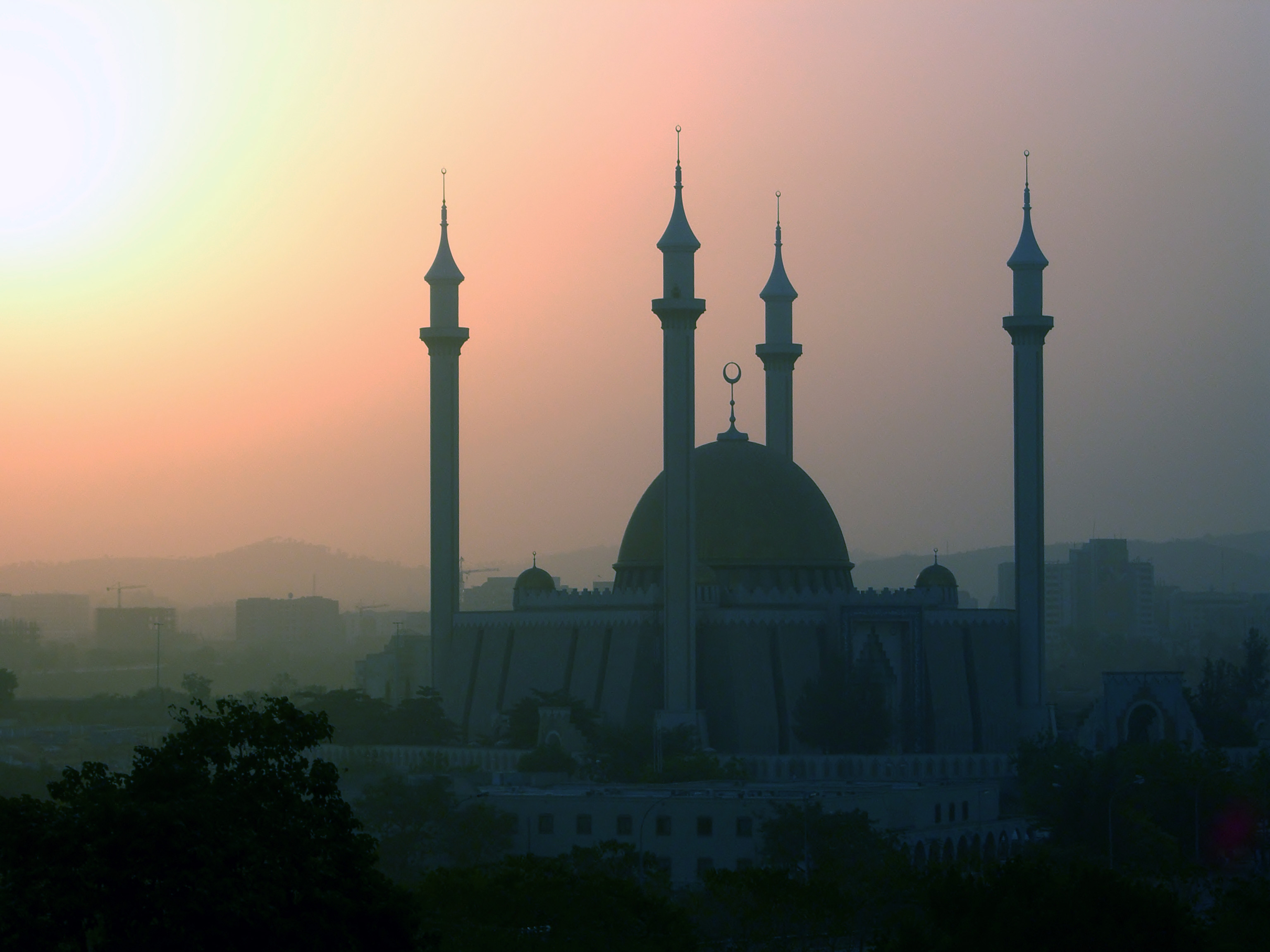
Harmattan haze surrounding Abuja National Mosque in Abuja

The Harmattan is a season in West Africa that occurs between the end of November and the middle of March. It is characterized by a dry and dusty northeasterly trade wind, of the same name, which blows from the Sahara over West Africa into the Gulf of Guinea. The name is related to the word haramata in the Twi language. The temperature is cold usually at night but can be very hot in certain places during the day. Generally, temperature differences can depend on local circumstances.

The Harmattan blows during the dry season, which occurs during the months with the lowest sun. In this season, the subtropical ridge of high pressure stays over the central Sahara and the low-pressure Intertropical Convergence Zone (ITCZ) stays over the Gulf of Guinea. On its passage over the Sahara, the Harmattan picks up fine dust and sand particles (between 0.5 and 10 micrometres). It is also known as the "doctor wind", because of its invigorating dryness compared with oppressive humid tropical air.

== Effects ==
This season differs from winter because it is characterized by cold, dry, dust-laden wind, and also wide fluctuations in the ambient temperatures between the day and night. Temperatures can easily be as low as 9 °C (48 °F) early in the day, but in the afternoon the temperature can climb to as high as 35 °C (95 °F), while the relative humidity drops under 5%. It can also be hot in some regions, like in the Sahara.

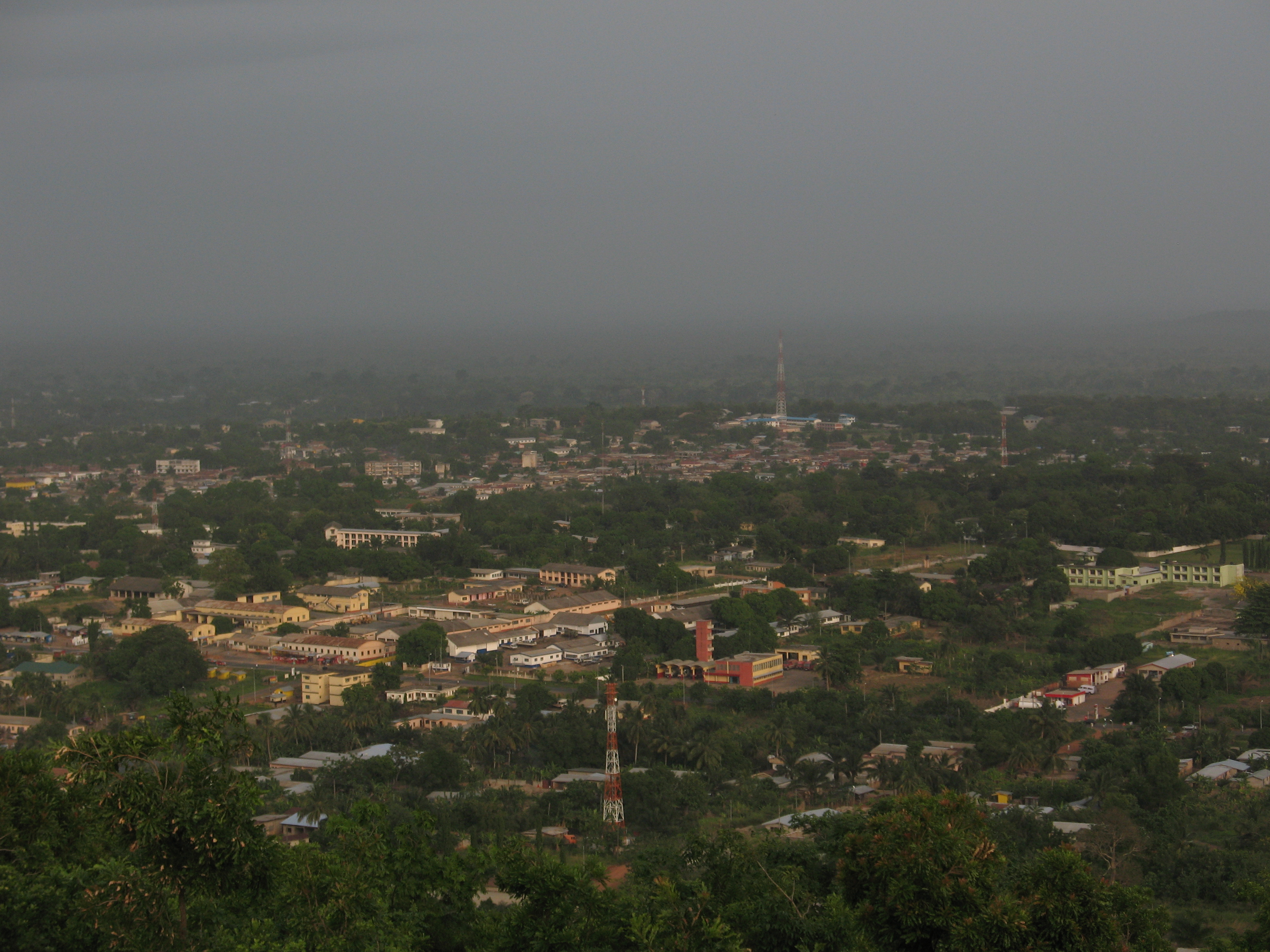
Harmattan haze over Ho, Ghana

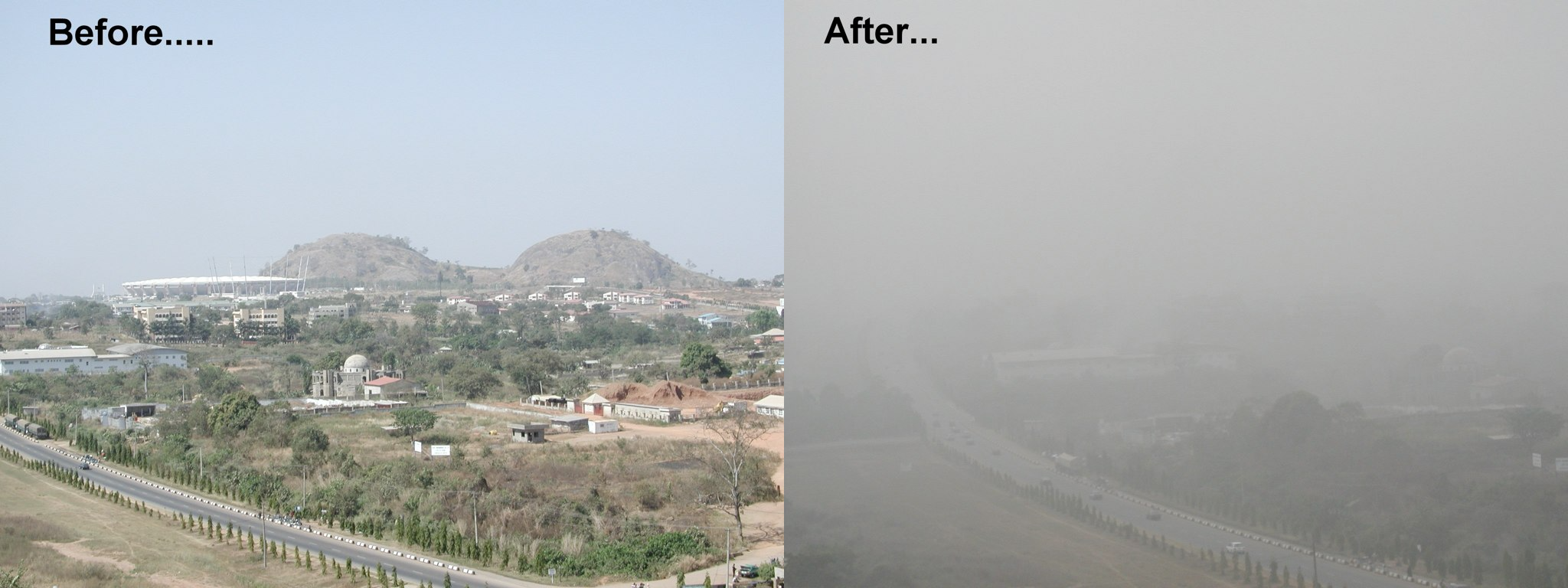
Before-and-after comparison of harmattan in Abuja (2004)

The air is particularly dry and desiccating when the Harmattan blows over the region. The Harmattan brings desert-like weather conditions: it lowers the humidity, dissipates cloud cover, prevents rainfall formation and sometimes creates big clouds of dust which can result in dust storms or sandstorms. The wind can increase fire risk and cause severe crop damage. The interaction of the Harmattan with monsoon winds can cause tornadoes.

=== Harmattan haze ===
In some countries in West Africa, the heavy amount of dust in the air can severely limit visibility and block the sun for several days, comparable to a heavy fog. This effect is known as the Harmattan haze. It costs airlines millions of dollars in cancelled and diverted flights each year. When the haze is weak, the skies are clear. The extreme dryness of the air may cause branches of trees to die.

=== Health ===
A 2024 study found that dust carried by the Harmattan increases infant and child mortality, as well as persistent adverse health impacts on surviving children.

Humidity can drop below 15%, which can result in spontaneous nosebleeds for some people. Other health effects on humans may include dryness of the skin, dried or chapped lips, eyes, and respiratory system, including aggravation of asthma.

== See also ==
- Dust Bowl
- Khamsin
