= Khazri =

Cold north Caspian Sea wind

Khazri (Azerbaijani: Xəzri) is the name of the cold north Caspian Sea wind that blows across the Absheron Peninsula throughout the year, particularly in Baku. Khazri is a gale-force coastal wind and one of the prevailing winds in the area. The speed of khazri can sometimes exceed 29 m/s. It damages some economic sectors. However, the wind provides cool temperatures during the summer. The Khazri wind is opposed to the Gilavar, the warm wind from the south, usually felt throughout the summertime.
