= Abrolhos squall =

Seasonal squall off the coast of Brazil

An Abrolhos squall (or Abroholos squall or simply abroholos) is a squall near the Abrolhos Islands off the coast of eastern Brazil that typically occurs from May through August (austral winter). The squall occurs near 18°S latitude, located between Cabo de São Tomé and Cabo Frio.

The southeast trade winds of the tropical South Atlantic Ocean acquire heat and moisture traversing the warm Brazilian current offshore, providing moisture for this rain and thundersquall phenomenon. The Abrolhos squall typically occurs along Antarctic cold fronts penetrating into the tropics.
