= Shamal (wind) =

Northwesterly wind blowing over Iraq and the Persian Gulf state

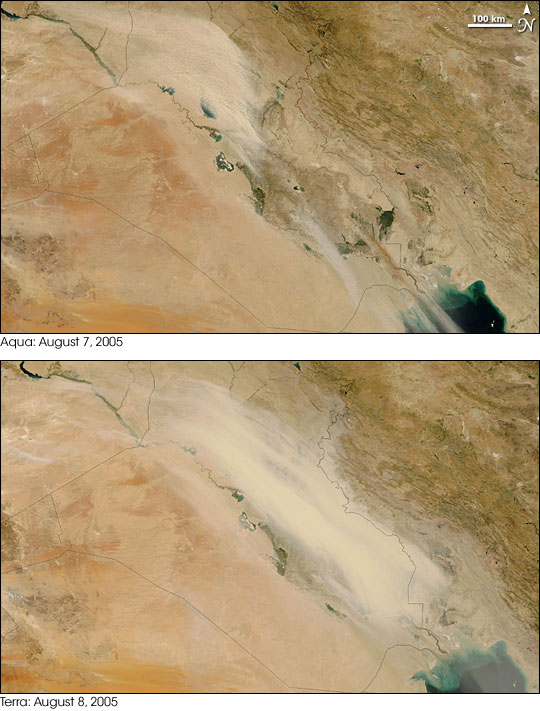
A shamal overspreading Iraq

A shamal (Arabic: شمال, 'north') is a northwesterly wind blowing over Iraq and the Persian Gulf states (including Saudi Arabia and Kuwait), often strong during the day, but decreasing at night. This weather effect occurs from once to several times a year, mostly in summer, but sometimes in winter. The resulting wind typically creates large sandstorms that impact Iraq, most sand having been picked up from Jordan and Syria.

== Synoptic conditions ==
=== Summer shamal ===
When a passing storm with a strong cold front passes over the mountains of Iran, the leading edge of a mass of relatively cooler air kicks up dust and sand, sending it aloft. Maximum temperatures nevertheless average more than 105 °F (41 °C) during the period.

=== Winter shamal ===
In Iraq, where winter storms can bring heavy snow to the terrain, a layer of dust can settle onto the snowpack.

A winter shamal is associated with the strengthening of a high-pressure area over the peninsula after the passage of a cold front while a deep trough of low pressure maintains itself over areas east of the Persian Gulf. This leads to strong northerly wind over the Persian Gulf for periods up to five days. They are associated with cold temperatures.

The places around the Middle East most likely to see the winter variety lie near Lavan Island, Halul Island, and Ras Rakan. They persist from 24–36 hours during the winter and occur as frequently as two to three times per month in December–February. A persistent three-to five-day event occurs only once or twice a winter, and is accompanied by very high winds and seas.

== Effects ==
Shamals normally last three to five days. The dust and sandstorm is several thousand feet deep. Wind speeds can reach up to 70 km/h (43 mph). Such events can impact health and transport, as visibility becomes limited, and some flights get cancelled. Sand dunes build up on roads and require considerable effort to remove. Some infrastructure, such as street signs, become damaged by the shamals.

== Examples ==
A study by Hokkaido University on fossil corals in Oman provides an evidence that prolonged winter shamal seasons around 2200 BCE led to the salinization of the irrigated fields; hence, a dramatic decrease in crop production triggered a widespread famine and eventually the collapse of the ancient Akkadian Empire.

Some investigations have also reported that dust storms generated over west Asian regions during summer can alter regional circulation features, even affecting the Indian summer monsoon rainfall.

A notable storm caused by a shamal covered Baghdad with sand on 8 August 2005, resulting in a closing of nearly all shops and public activity. The storm also overwhelmed Baghdad's Yarmuk Hospital, which treated more than a thousand people with respiratory distress. From 1–4 February 2008, a massive dust storm was associated with a shamal wind advected over the Arabian Sea. The leading edge of the dust storm moved at an estimated 20 km/h, and at one point extended from Muqdisho, Somalia, to Mumbai, India. Dust from this storm received press from the sports media as it swept across the Dubai Desert Classic golf tournament, where Tiger Woods was playing.

In May 2022, one person died and 5,000 people were admitted to hospitals with breathing problems in Baghdad, Al Anbar and Najaf Governorates, due to shamal blowing which turned the skies orange in those regions.

== Miscellany ==
- A question about this wind was part of the 2003 National Geographic Bee.
- Shamal, an Arabic word meaning "north", is a male name in Afghanistan and Kurdistan, and means both "wind" and "north".
- A sandstorm caused by shamal winds tore apart a U.S. Marine encampment on HBO's Generation Kill TV series about the 2003 invasion of Iraq.

== See also ==
- Asian dust
- Dust storm
- N'aschi
