= Norte (wind) =

The Norte is a strong cold wind which blows from the northeast in Mexico along the Gulf of Mexico. It primarily affects the states along the Coast, including: Tamaulipas, Veracruz, Tabasco, Campeche, and Yucatán. Unlike El Nino, it's a localized wind and not part of a broader climate pattern.

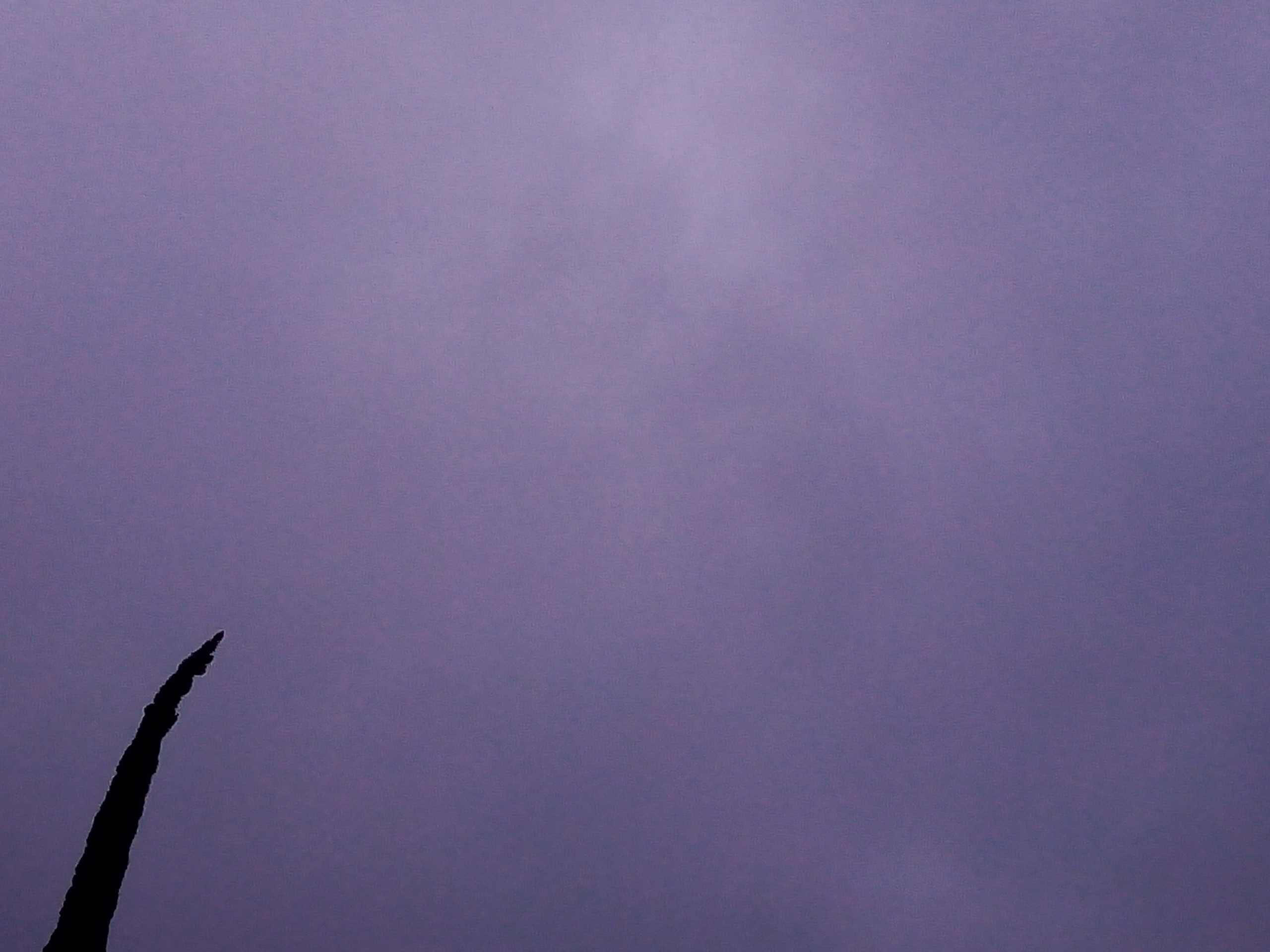

== See also ==
- List of local winds
