= Elephanta (wind) =

The Elephanta is a strong southerly or southeasterly wind which blows on the Malabar coast of India during the months of September and October and marks the end of the southwest monsoon.
