= N'aschi =

The N'aschi (Persian: ناشی, romanized: nâši, lit. 'growing'; variously Nashi, N'aashi, Naschi, Nashim) is a northeastern wind that occurs in winter on the Iranian coast of the Persian Gulf, especially near the entrance to the gulf, and also on the Makran coast. It is probably associated with an outflow from the central Asiatic anticyclone, which extends over the high land of Iran. It is similar in character, but less severe than the bora.

It brings clouds, precipitation and dust; it is connected with a high over the Iranian Plateau and a low over the Persian Gulf, bringing cold polar air from over Central Asia.
