= Black storm =

Weather pattern occurring in the Indian subcontinent

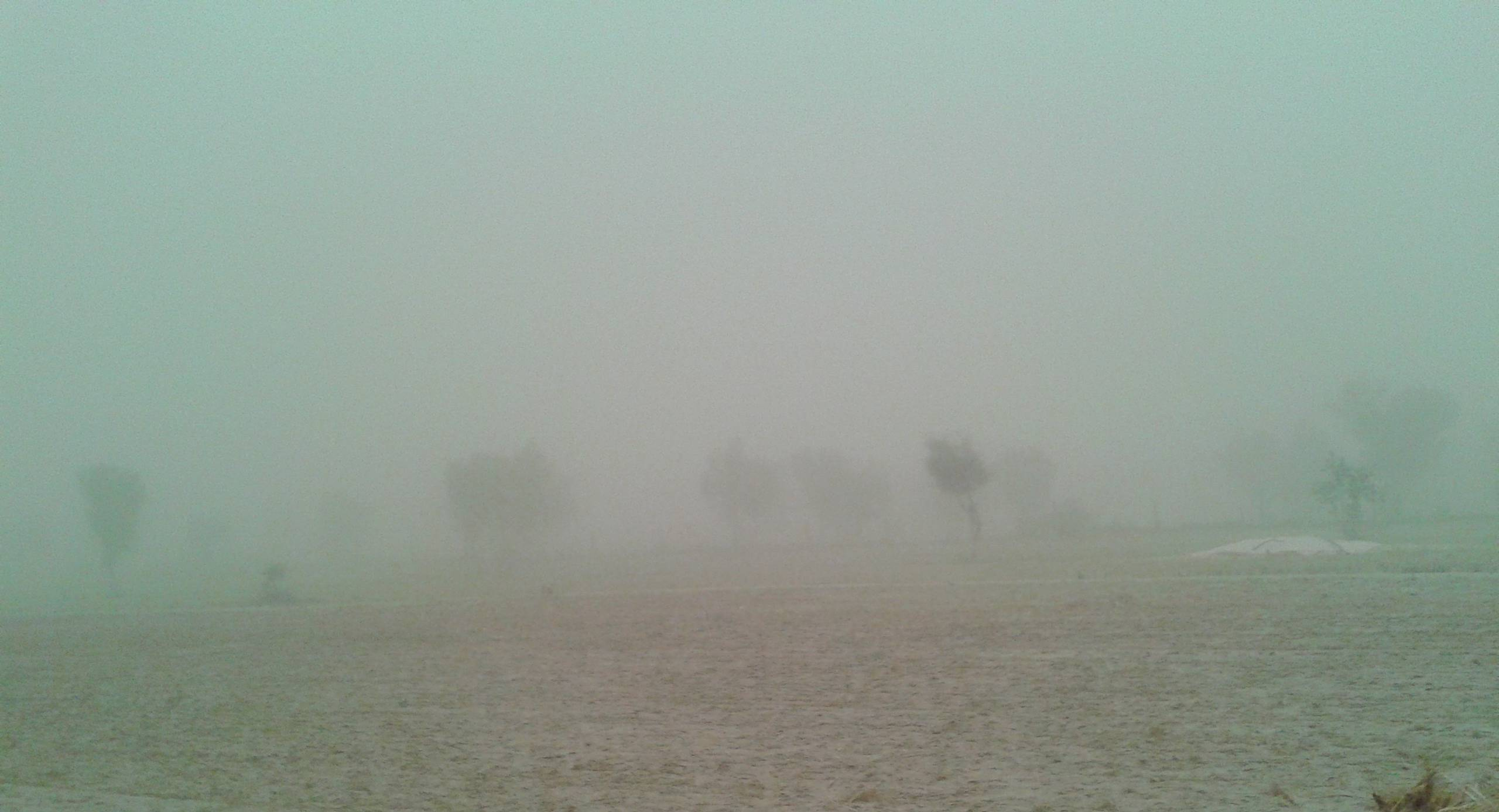
A scene of Kali Andhi

Black storms, locally called Kali Andhi, Kali Nheri in South Asia (Hindi: काली आँधी, Punjabi: کالی نھیری, Urdu: کالی آندھی, literal meaning: Black Storm) are violent dust squalls that occur in the early-summer in the northwestern parts of the Indo-Gangetic Plain region of the Indian subcontinent.

They are usually brief, but they can block out the sun, drastically reduce visibility and cause property damage and injuries. They are a common precursor to the arrival of the monsoon in the northern plains. It is quite common in Punjab in the Cholistan and Thar deserts in Pakistan and Rajasthan in India.
