= Brickfielder =

Arid northerly wind of Southern Australia

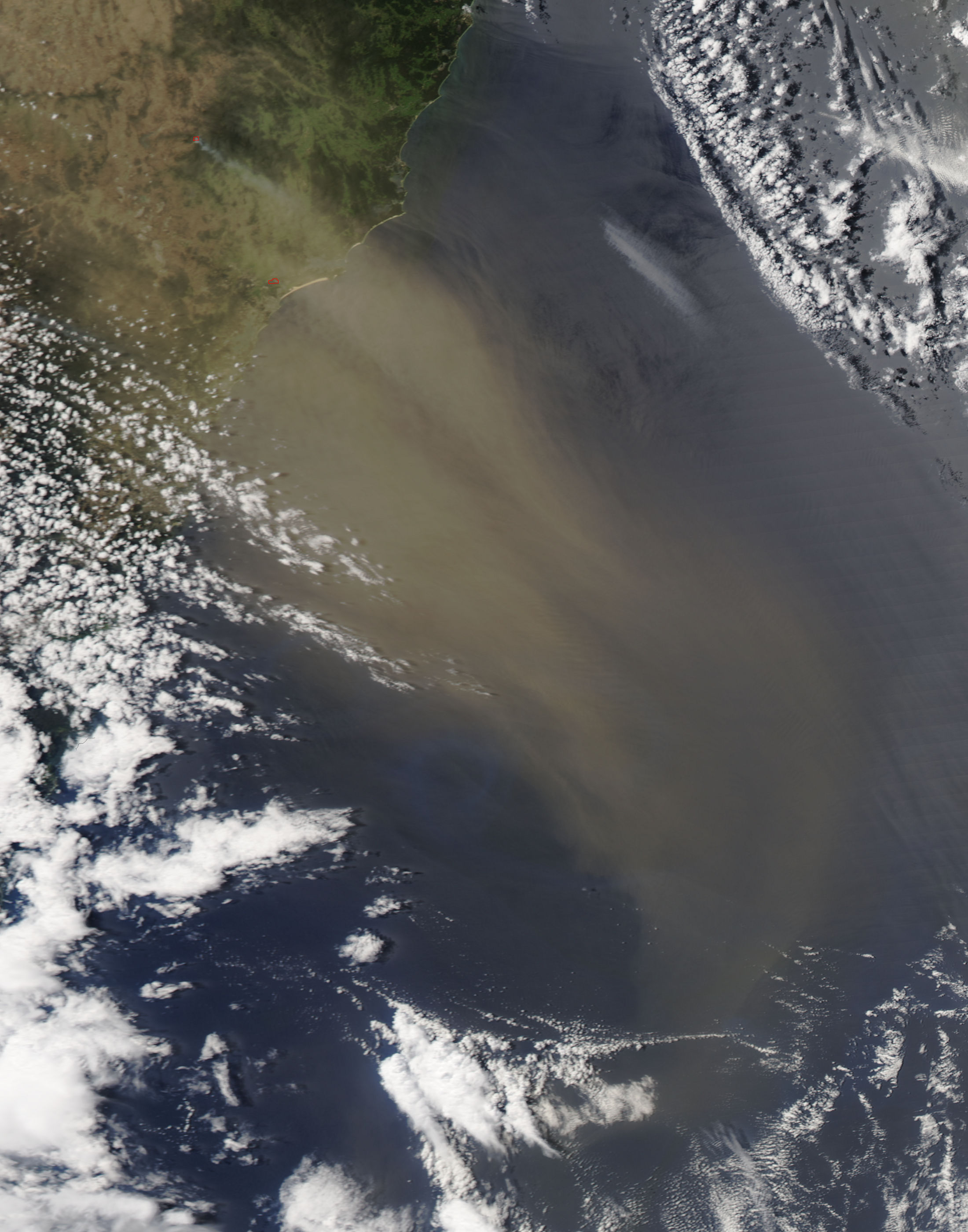
The Brickfielder is the cause of dust storms in the east.

The Brickfielder is a hot and dry wind in Southern Australia that develops in the country's deserts in late spring and summer, which heavily raises temperatures in the southeast coast.

== Etymology ==
The term name was recorded in early 19th century, which emanated from the name of Brickfield Hill, a site which was a former brickworks in the centre of Sydney CBD. The area was associated with dusty wind that conveyed clouds of reddish dust from the brickworks over the emerging city. A more frequently used term for the winds is a "burster".

== Development ==
The Brickfielder precedes the passage of a frontal zone of a low pressure system passing by, and causes severe dust storms that often last for days and led to its naming as the winds blow up red brick dust. It blows to the coastal regions in the south from the outback, reaching the capitals of Adelaide and Melbourne to south, Canberra and Sydney to the east. The dry northwesterly desert air from the interior of Australia transports dusty clouds alongside sudden hot spells that usually surpass 38 °C (100 °F) to places that feature a relatively mild climate. The temperature might rise up by 15–20 °C (27–36 °F) within hours.

== Effects ==
The northern Brickfielder is almost invariably followed by a strong "southerly buster," cloudy and cool from the ocean. The two winds are due to the same cause, viz. a cyclonic system over the Australian Bight. These systems frequently extend inland as a narrow V-shaped depression (the apex northward), bringing the winds from the north on their eastern sides and from the south on their western. Hence as the narrow system passes eastward the wind suddenly changes from north to south, and the thermometer has been known to fall 8.5 °C (15 °F) in twenty minutes.

On the coastal plains of New South Wales, such as in Western Sydney, the Brickfielder may be exacerbated by the southeast Australian foehn.

== See also ==
- Sirocco
- Southeast Australian foehn
- Climate of Australia
- Zonda wind
- Harmattan
