= Puelche =

Puelche or Puelches may refer to:

- Puelche people or Gününa Küne people, an Indigenous people of Argentina and Chile
- Puelche language or Gününa Küne language, spoken by the Gününa Küne or Puelche people
- Puelche (wind), a dry wind of Chile
- Puelches, La Pampa, a village in Argentina
