= Chinook wind =

Warm, dry wind in North America

Chinook winds, or simply chinooks, are two types of prevailing warm, generally westerly winds in western North America: Coastal Chinooks and interior Chinooks. The coastal Chinooks are persistent seasonal, wet, southwesterly winds blowing in from the ocean. The interior Chinooks are occasional warm, dry föhn winds blowing down the eastern sides of interior mountain ranges. The coastal Chinooks were the original term, used along the northwest coast, and the term in the interior of North America is later and derives from the coastal term.

- Along the Pacific Northwest coast, where the name is pronounced /tʃɪˈnʊk/ ('chin'+'uk'), the name refers to wet, warm winds off the ocean from the southwest; this is the original use of the term. The coastal Chinook winds deliver tremendous amounts of moisture both as rain along the coast and snow in the coastal mountains, that sustain the characteristic temperate rainforests and climate of the Pacific Northwest.

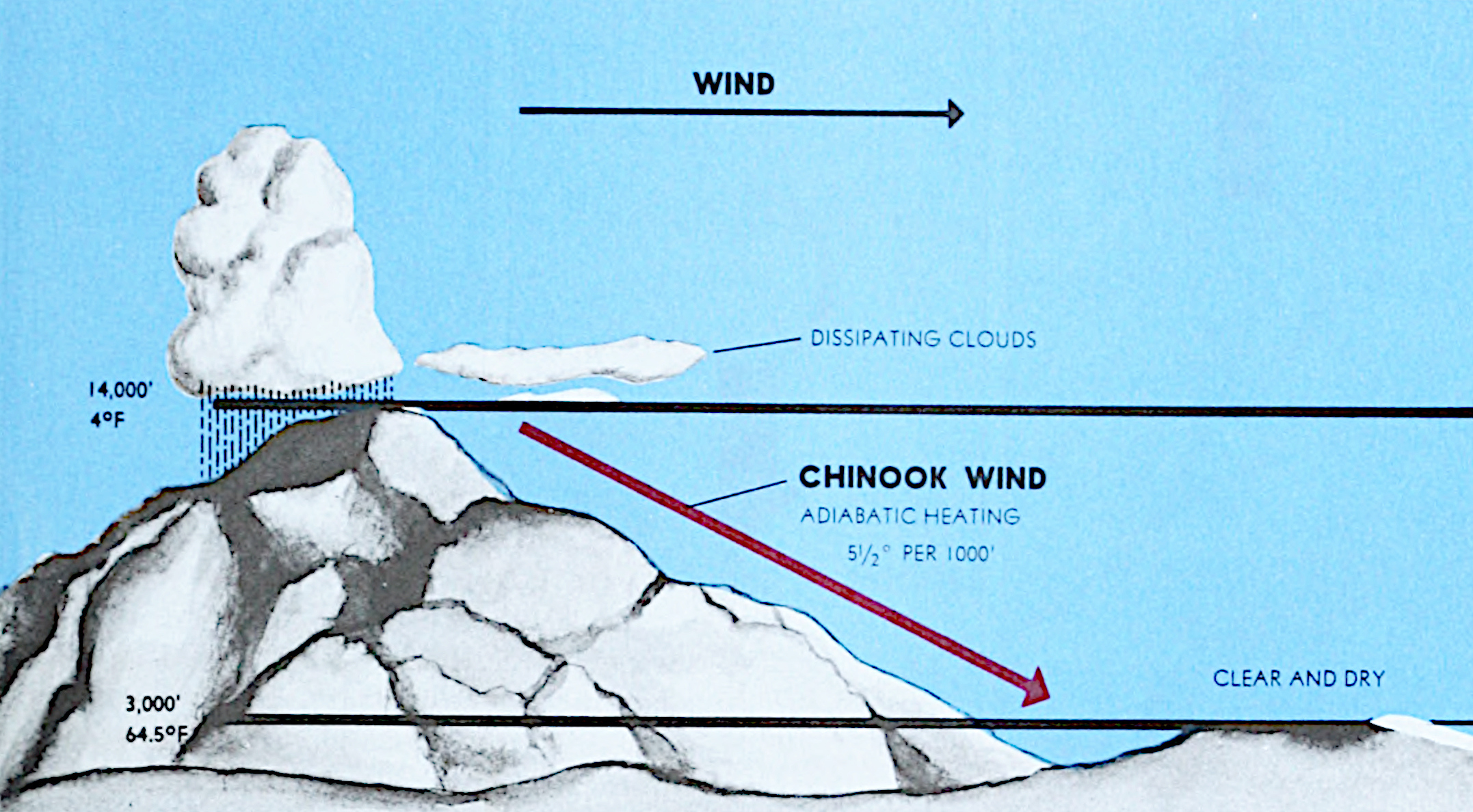
Adiabatic warming of downward moving air; this produces the warm föhn wind called a "Chinook" (pronounced shin‑uk) in interior North America.

- In North American western interior, the same name is used for föhn winds, generally, where the Canadian Prairies and Great Plains lie immediately east of various interior mountain ranges. There the name is pronounced /ʃɪˈnʊk/ ('shin'+'uk'). The same warm, wet coastal winds can also become the warm föhn winds on the eastern sides of mountain ranges, after having lost their moisture on the western sides; however, due to expanded use of the term in the interior for any föhn wind, interior Chinooks are not necessarily originally coastal Chinooks.

In the interior of North America, the Blackfoot people call these winds the "snow eater"; however, the more commonly used term "Chinook" originates from the name of the eponymous Chinook people, who lived near the ocean, along the lower Columbia River, where the term was first derived. The reference to "a Chinook" wind or weather system originally meant, to euro-American settlers along the Pacific Northwest coast, a warming wind from the ocean blowing into the interior regions of the Pacific Northwest of the North America.

A strong föhn wind can make snow one foot (30 cm) deep almost vanish in one day. The snow partly sublimates and partly melts and evaporates in the dry wind. Chinook winds have been observed to raise winter temperature, often from below −20 °C (−4 °F) to as high as 10–20 °C (50–68 °F) for a few hours or days, then temperatures plummet to their base levels.

Its speed is generally between 16 km/h (10mph) and 60 km/h (37.5mph), gusting to 100 km/h (62.5 mph).

== In the Pacific Northwest ==
"Chinook" is used for coastal Chinook winds in British Columbia, and is the original use of the term, being rooted in the lore of coastal natives and immigrants, and brought to Alberta by French-speaking fur-traders. Such winds are extremely wet and warm and arrive off the western coast of North America from the southwest. These same winds have more recently been called the pineapple express, since they are of tropical origin, roughly from the area of the Pacific near Hawaii.

The air associated with a coastal Chinook is stable; this minimizes wind gusts and often keeps winds light in sheltered areas. In exposed areas, fresh gales are frequent during a Chinook, but strong gale- or storm-force winds are uncommon; most of the region's stormy winds come when a fast "westerly" jet stream lets air masses from temperate and subarctic latitudes clash.

A coastal Chinook comes in when an Arctic air mass is holding steady over the coast, the tropical dampness brought in suddenly cools, penetrating the frozen air and coming down in volumes of powder snow, sometimes to sea level. Snowfalls and the cold spells that spawned them only last a few days during a Chinook; as the warm coastal Chinooks blow from the southwest, they push back east the cold Arctic air. The snow melts quickly and is gone within a week.

The effects on the Interior of British Columbia when a coastal Chinook is in effect are the reverse. In a rainy spell, most of the heavy moisture will be wrung out of the rising air as a consequence of crossing over the mountain ramparts before the air mass descends (and hence warms and dries) into the Fraser Canyon and the Thompson River-Okanagan area. The effects are similar to those of an Albertan interior Chinook, though not to the same extreme, partly because the Okanagan is relatively warmer than the Prairies, and partly because of the additional number of precipitation-catching mountain ranges between Kelowna and Calgary. When the coastal Chinook brings snow to the coast during a period of coastal cold, bright but chilly weather in the interior will give way to a slushy melting of snow, more due to the warm spell than because of rain.

=== Pronunciation in the Pacific Northwest ===
The word "Chinook" remains in common use among local fishermen and people in communities along the British Columbia Coast, and coastal Washington and Oregon, and in particular, the term is used in the Puget Sound area of Washington. Coastal "Chinook" is not pronounced shin-uk (/ʃɪˈnʊk/) as it is in the interior, east of the Cascades, but is in the original coastal pronunciation chin-uk (/tʃɪˈnʊk/).

In British Columbia and other parts of the Pacific Northwest, the word Chinook was predominantly pronounced /tʃɪˈnʊk/ chi-NUUK. However, the common pronunciation current throughout most of the inland Pacific Northwest, Alberta, and the rest of Canada, is /ʃɪˈnʊk/ shi-NUUK, as in French. This difference may be because it was the Métis employees of the Hudson's Bay Company, who were familiar with the Chinook people and country, brought the name east of the Cascades and Rockies, along with their own ethnic pronunciation. Early records are clear that tshinook was the original pronunciation, before the word's transmission east of the Rockies.

=== First nations myth from British Columbia ===
Native legend of the Lil'wat subgroup of the St'at'imc tells of a girl named Chinook-Wind, who married Chinook Glacier, and moved to his country, which was in the area of today's Birkenhead River. She pined for her warm sea-home in the southwest, and sent a message to her people. They came to her in a vision in the form of snowflakes, and told her they were coming to get her. They came in great number and quarrelled with Glacier over her, but they overwhelmed him and in the end she went home with them.

== Chinooks in Alberta and eastern British Columbia ==
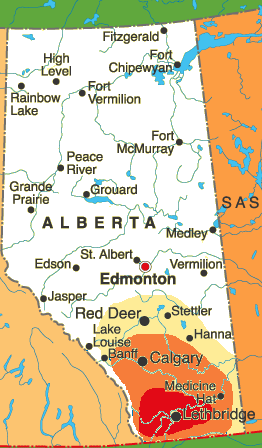
Where interior Chinooks occur most frequently.

Interior Chinooks are most prevalent over southern Alberta in Canada, especially in a belt from Pincher Creek and Crowsnest Pass through Lethbridge, which get 30–35 Chinook days per year, on average. Interior Chinooks become less frequent further south in the United States, and are not as common north of Red Deer, but they can and do occur annually as far north as High Level in northwestern Alberta and Fort St. John in northeastern British Columbia, and as far south as Las Vegas, Nevada, and occasionally to Carlsbad, in eastern New Mexico.

In Pincher Creek, the temperature rose by 25.5 °C (45.9 °F), from −23.2 to 2.2 °C (−9.8 to 36.0 °F), in one hour on 6 January 1966. During the winter, driving can be treacherous, as the wind blows snow across roadways, sometimes causing roads to vanish and snowdrifts to pile up higher than a metre. Empty semitrailer trucks driving along Highway 3 and other routes in southern Alberta have been blown over by the high gusts of wind caused by interior Chinooks.

On 27 February 1992, Claresholm, Alberta, a town just south of Calgary, recorded a temperature of 24 °C (75 °F); again, the next day 21 °C (70 °F) was recorded.

=== Clashing with Arctic air mass ===
The interior Chinooks can seem to battle with Arctic air masses at times.

This clash of temperatures can remain stationary, or move back and forth, in the latter case causing such fluctuations as a warm morning, a bitterly cold afternoon, and a warm evening. A curtain of fog often accompanies the clash between warm to the west and cold to the east.

=== Chinook arch ===
Two common cloud patterns seen in the interior during this time are a chinook arch overhead, and a bank of clouds (also referred to as a cloud wall) obscuring the mountains to the west. The bank appears to be an approaching storm, but does not advance any further to the east.

One of its most striking features of the interior Chinook weather system is the Chinook arch, a föhn cloud in the form of a band of stationary stratus clouds, caused by air rippling over the mountains due to orographic lifting. To those unfamiliar with it, the Chinook arch may at times look like a threatening storm cloud, however, the arch clouds rarely produce rain or snow. They can also create stunning sunrises and sunsets.

A similar phenomenon, the nor'west arch, also a föhn cloud, is seen in eastern New Zealand.

The stunning colors seen in the Chinook arch are quite common. Typically, the colours will change throughout the day, starting with yellow, orange, red, and pink shades in the morning as the sun comes up, grey shades at midday changing to pink / red colours, and then orange / yellow hues just before the sun sets.

Chinook arch over Calgary, 6 January 2003

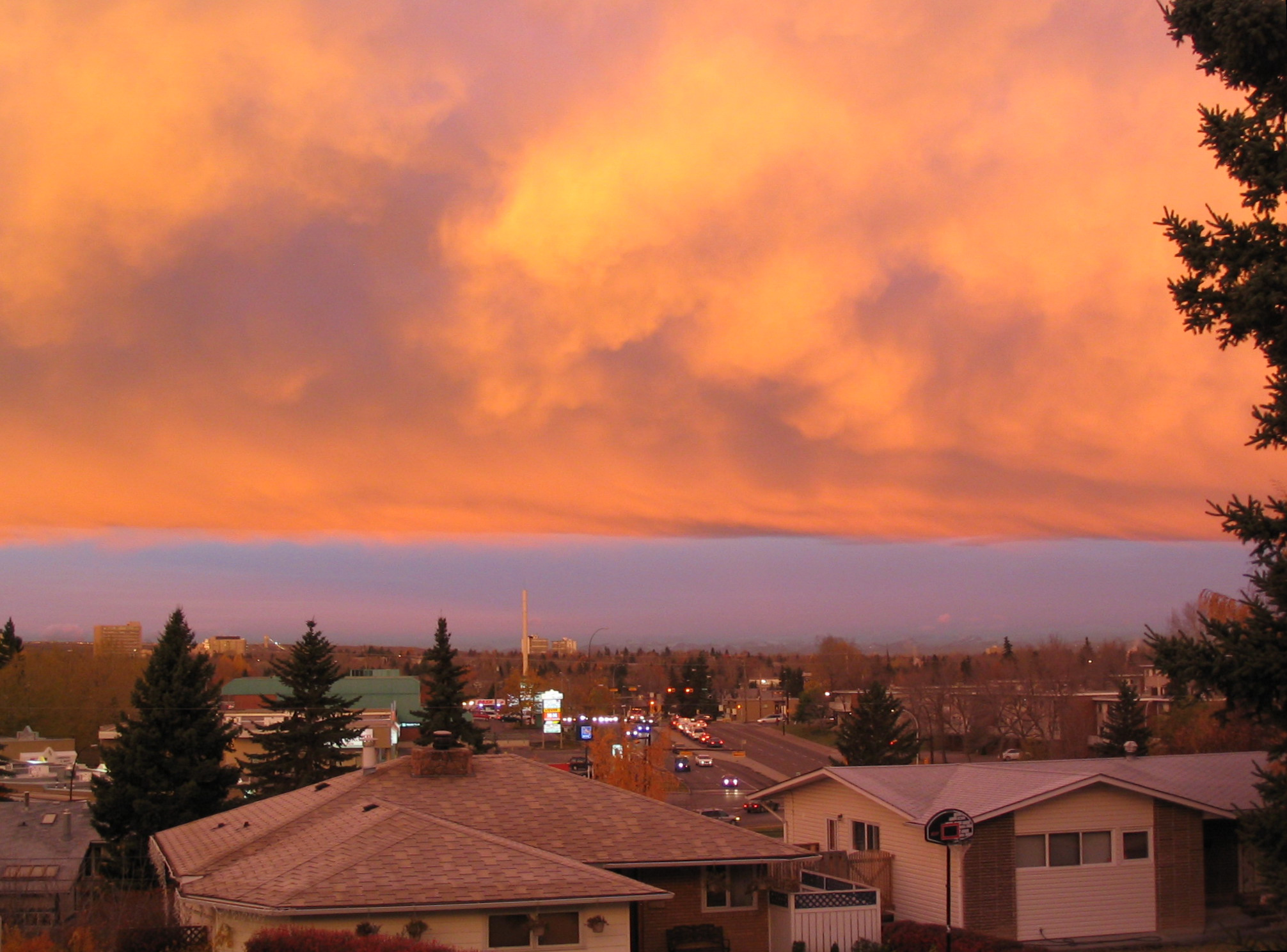
The extreme colors of a Chinook arch

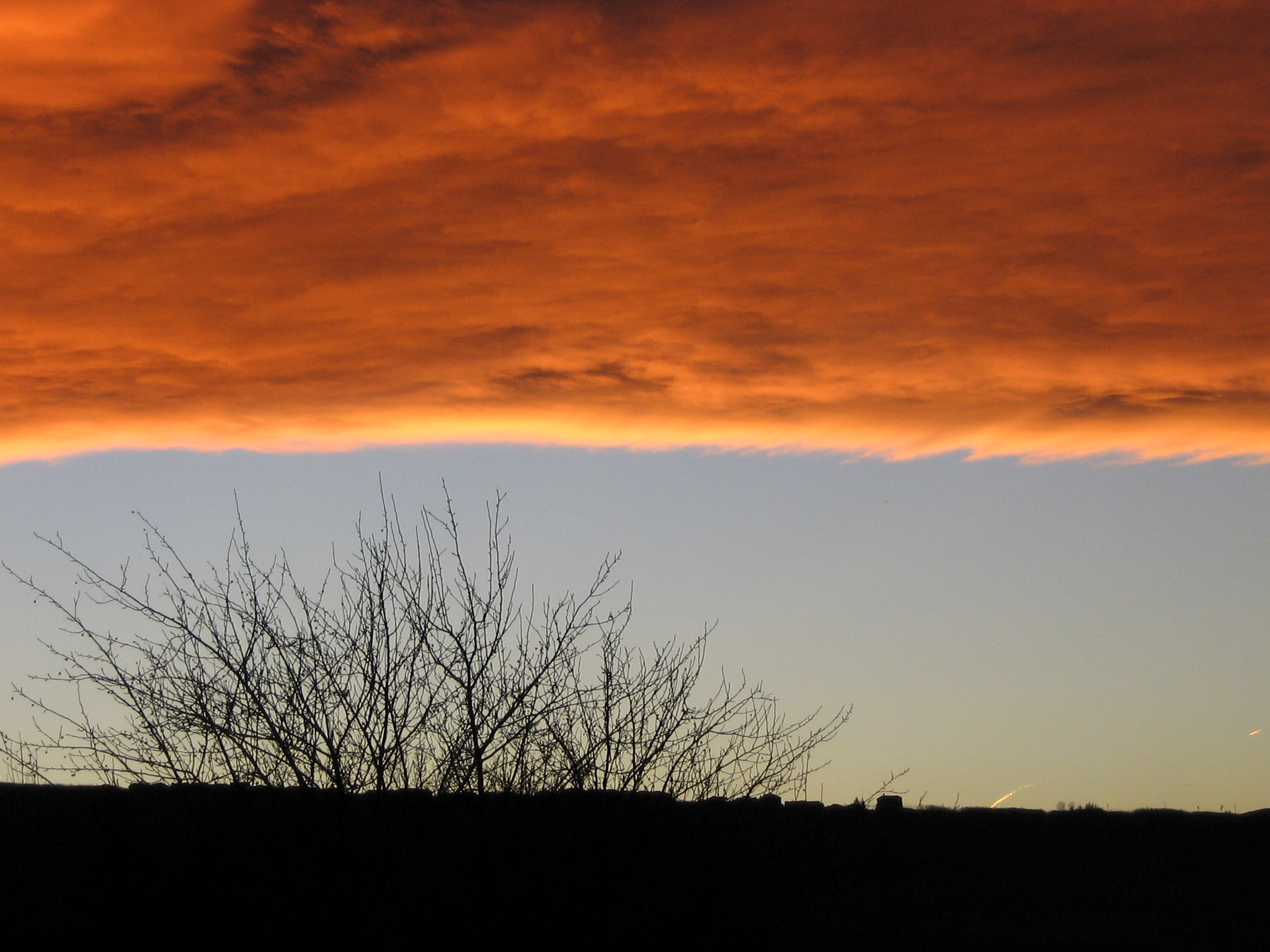
Chinook arch in Calgary, Alberta, 19 November 2005

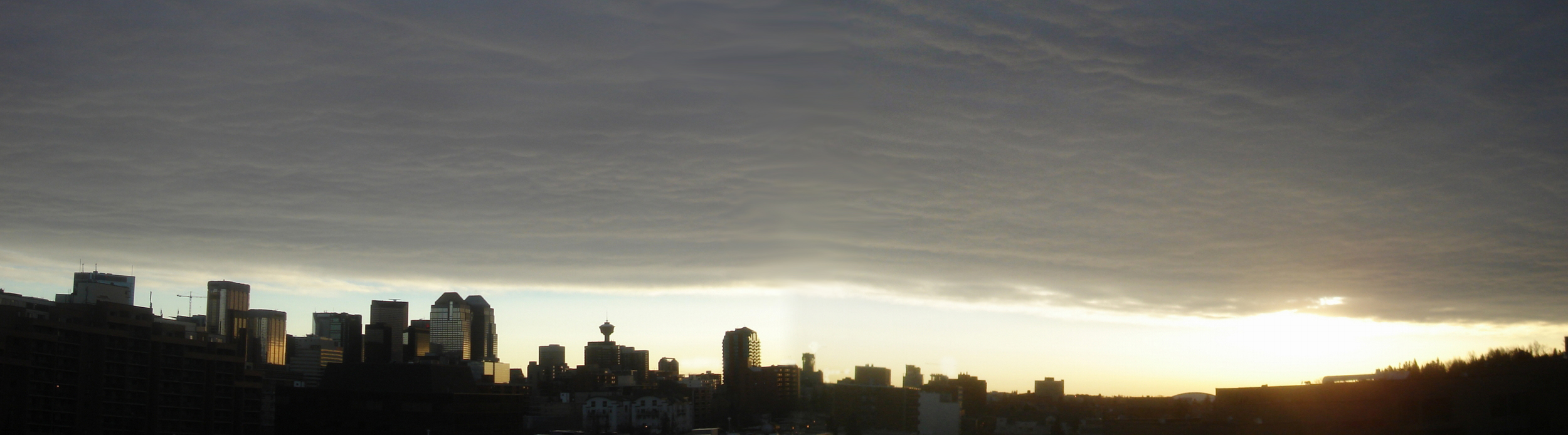
Chinook arch over Calgary, March 2007

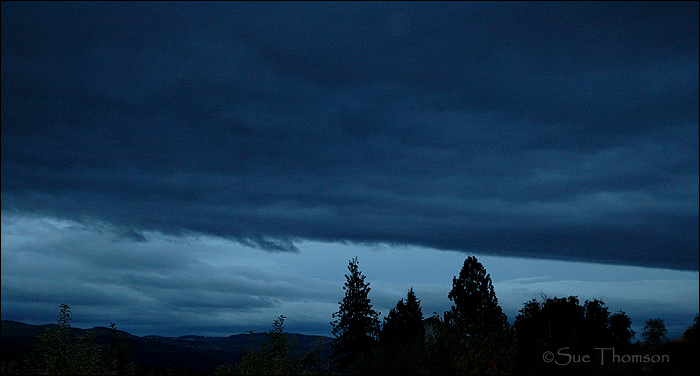
Chinook arch over Kelowna, BC, Canada, 2 October 2007
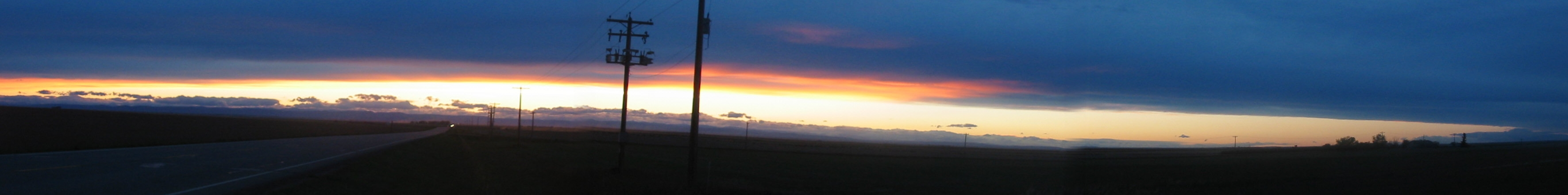
Chinook arch in southern Alberta

=== Cause of occurrence ===
The interior Chinook is a föhn wind, a rain shadow wind which results from the subsequent adiabatic warming of air which has dropped most of its moisture on windward slopes (orographic lift). As a consequence of the different adiabatic rates of moist and dry air, the air on the leeward slopes becomes warmer than equivalent elevations on the windward slopes.

Sometimes the interior Chinooks are caused by the same air flow as the coastal Chinooks: As moist winds from the Pacific (coastal Chinooks) are forced to rise over the mountains, the moisture in the air is condensed and falls out as precipitation, while the air cools at the moist adiabatic rate of 5 °C / 1000 m (3.5 °F / 1000 ft). The dried air then descends on the leeward side of the mountains, warming at the dry adiabatic rate of 10 °C / 1000 m (5.5 °F / 1000 ft).

The turbulence of the high winds also can prevent the usual nocturnal temperature inversion from forming on the lee side of the slope, allowing night-time temperatures to remain elevated.

Quite often, when the Pacific Northwest coast is being drenched by rain, the windward (western) side of the Rockies is being hammered by snow (robbing the air of its moisture), and the leeward (eastern) side of the Rockies in Alberta is basking in a föhn Chinook. The three different weather conditions are all caused by the same flow of air, hence the confusion over the use of the name "Chinook wind".

=== Interior Chinooks and gardening on Great Plains ===
The frequent midwinter thaws by interior Chinooks in Great Plains country are more of a bane than a blessing to gardeners. Plants can be visibly brought out of dormancy by persistent, warm interior Chinook winds, or have their hardiness reduced even if they appear to remain dormant. In either case, they become vulnerable to later cold waves.

Many plants which do well at Winnipeg – where constant cold maintains dormancy throughout the winter – are difficult to grow in the Alberta Chinook belt. Examples include basswood, some apple, raspberry, and juneberry varieties, and Amur maples. Native trees in the interior Chinook-affected areas of Alberta are known to be small, with much less growth than the same species growing in areas not affected by interior Chinook winds. This is once again caused by the "off-and-on" dormancy throughout winter.

=== Health ===
Interior Chinook winds are said to sometimes cause a sharp increase in the number of migraine headaches suffered by the locals. At least one study conducted by the department of clinical neurosciences at the University of Calgary supports that belief.

In mid-winter over major centres such as Calgary, interior Chinooks can often override cold air in the city, trapping the pollutants in the cold air and causing inversion smog. At such times, it is possible for it to be cold at street level and much warmer at the tops of the skyscrapers and in higher terrain.

== Chinooks and föhn winds in the inland United States ==
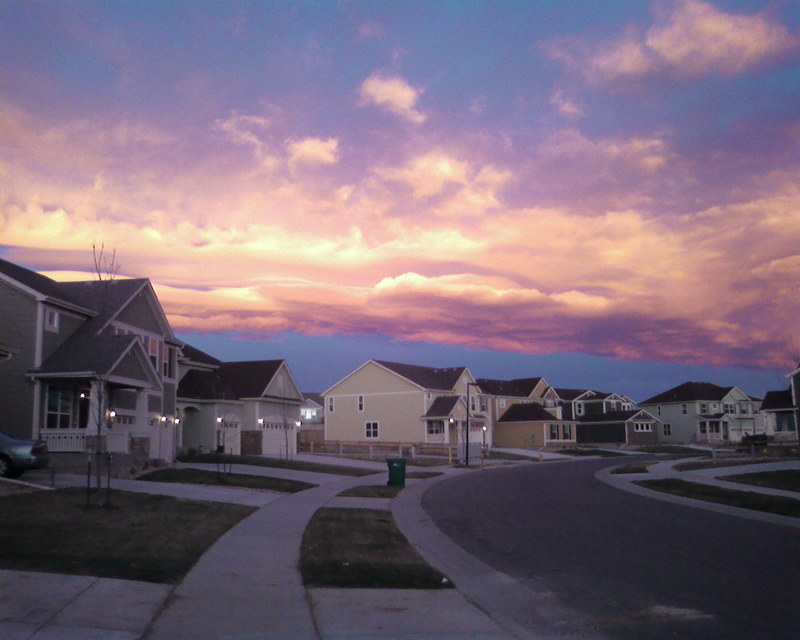
The signature interior Chinook arch over a Denver suburb in 2006

In the North American western interior, winds that are generally called föhn winds by meteorologists and climatologists are called "Chinooks". Regardless of the name, föhns can occur on the leeward side of any nearby mountain range. The föhns called "Chinook winds" are seen throughout most of inland western North America, particularly the Rocky Mountain region. Montana especially has a significant amount of föhn winds throughout much of the state during the winter months, but particularly coming off the Rocky Mountain Front in the northern and west-central areas of the state.

On rare occasions, Chinook winds generated on the eastern slope of the Rocky Mountains have reached as far east as Wisconsin.

== Records ==
Loma, Montana has the world record for the most extreme temperature change in a 24-hour period. On January 15, 1972, the temperature increased from −54 to 49 °F (−48 to 9 °C), a 103 °F (57 °C) change in temperature.

Spearfish, South Dakota holds the world record for the fastest increase and decrease in temperature. On January 22, 1943, the temperature increased from −4 to 45 °F (−20 to 7 °C), a 49 °F (27 °C) change in temperature, in just 2 minutes. Later that same day, the temperature decreased from 54 to −4 °F (12 to −20 °C), a 58 °F (32 °C) change in temperature. This occurred in 27 minutes.

Rapid City, South Dakota has the world record for the fastest decrease in temperature. On January 10, 1911, the temperature fell 47 °F (26 °C) in two hours, from 60 to 13 °F (16 to −11 °C).

== Squamish winds, williwaws, and Chugach föhns ==
The resulting outflow wind is more or less the opposite of British Columbia / Pacific Northwest coastal Chinook. These are called a squamish in certain areas, rooted in the direction of such winds coming down out of Howe Sound, home to the Squamish people, and in Alaska are called a williwaw. They consist of cold airstreams from the continental air mass pouring out of the interior plateau via certain river valleys and canyons penetrating the Coast Mountains towards the coast.

A similar, local föhn wind regularly occurs in the Cook Inlet region in Alaska, as air moves over the Chugach Mountains between Prince William Sound and Portage Glacier. Anchorage residents often believe the warm winds which melt snow and leave their streets slushy and muddy are a midwinter gift from Hawaii, following a common mistake that the warm winds come from the same place as the similar winds near the coasts in southern British Columbia, Washington, and Oregon.

== See also ==
- Katabatic wind – Downslope wind due to a high-density air
- Diablo wind – Northern California weather pattern
- Föhn wind – Dry downslope wind in the lee of mountains
- Southeast Australian foehn – Dry wind in southeastern Australia
- Nor'west arch – Föhn cloud formation in New Zealand
- Pineapple express – Meteorological phenomenon
- Santa Ana winds – California weather phenomenon
- Sundowner winds – California weather pattern
