= Southeast Australian foehn =

Dry wind in southeastern Australia

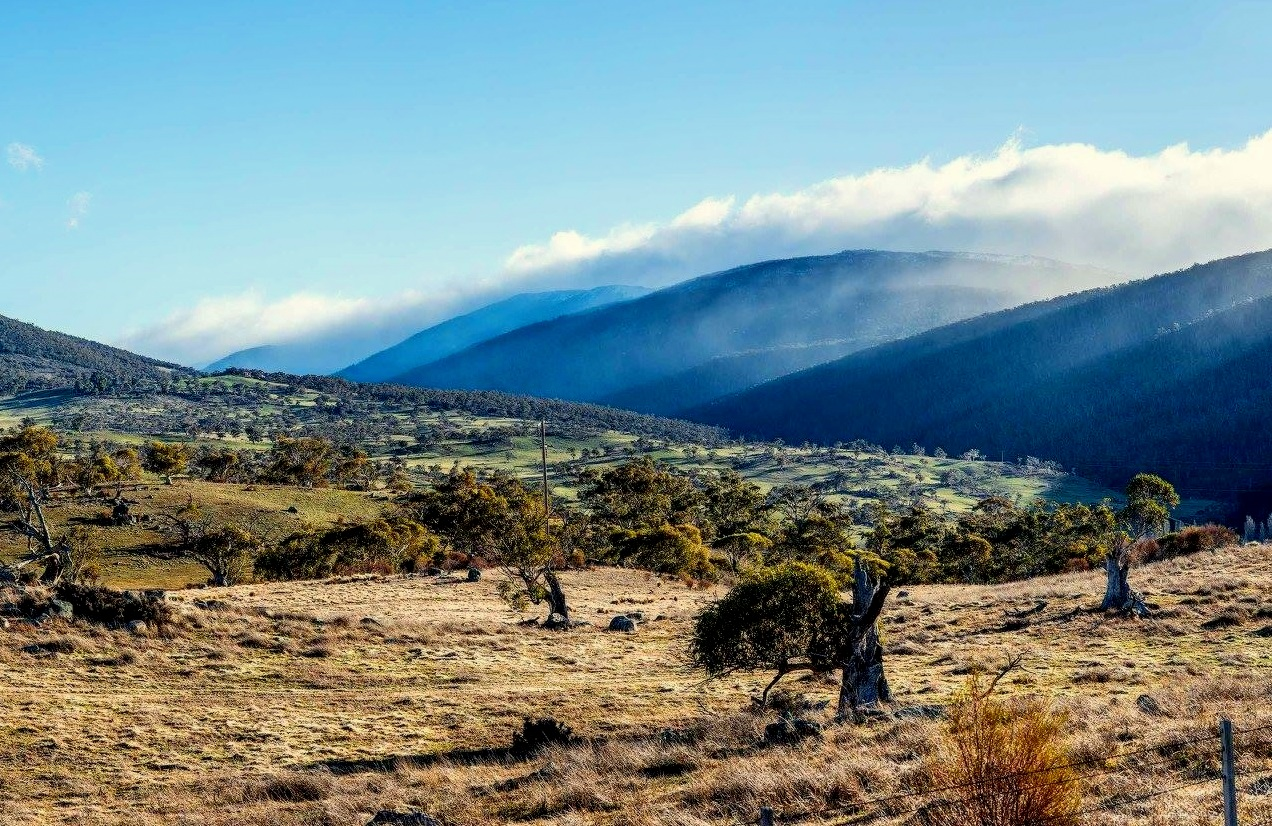
Föhn cloud over the Crackenback Range, near Jindabyne

The southeast Australian foehn is a westerly foehn wind and a rain shadow effect that occurs on the coastal plain of eastern New South Wales, and as well as in southeastern Victoria and eastern Tasmania, on the eastern side of the Great Dividing Range.

Ranging from cool to hot (depending on the season), the effect occurs when westerly winds descend steeply from the Great Dividing Range onto the coastal slopes, causing major adiabatic compression (the rate at which temperature decreases with altitude) and a substantial loss of moisture. The effect is known by other names, such as the Australian chinook, the Great Dividing wind, the Great Dividing foehn or simply westerly foehn.

Typically occurring from late autumn to spring, though not completely unheard of in the summer (particularly in eastern Tasmania), (Note: They occur throughout the year in Tasmania as the island sits in the path of the Roaring Forties and/or the prevailing westerlies.) the foehn effect mainly occurs when a westerly or south-westerly frontal system (which brings rainy and windy weather to southern capitals like Melbourne, Perth and Adelaide) passes over the Great Dividing Range and thereby results in clear to partly cloudy, relatively warmer conditions on the lee. (Note: Temperatures on the coastal plain are relative and therefore variable, ranging from 15 °C (59 °F) at the coolest (which is usual during polar blasts) to as high as 45 °C (113 °F) – All depending on the conditions on the windward side.)

== Formation and characteristics ==
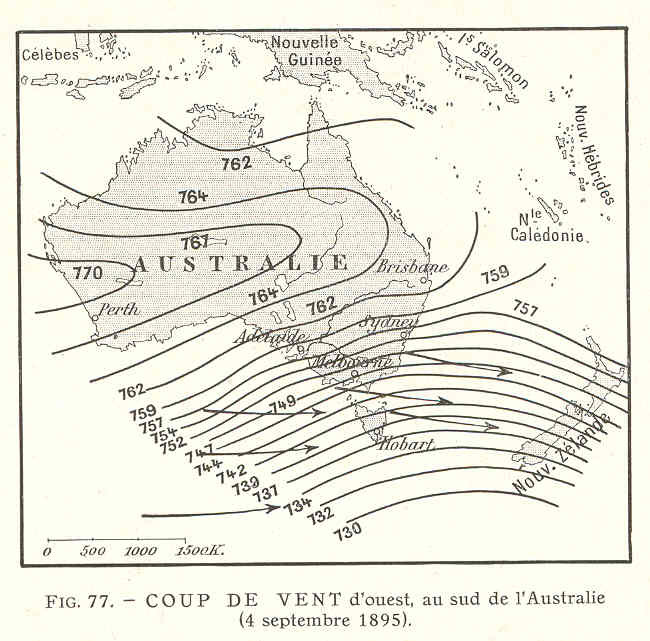
Foehn winds usually occur when the westerly wind belt moves northwards.

The foehn effect along Australia's east coast is associated with the passage of a deep low-pressure system across the Great Australian Bight and Bass Strait, which causes strong winds to blow nearly perpendicular to parts of the Great Dividing Range. These conditions occur predominantly from late autumn through winter and spring, and are most common during a negative AAO phase. The foehn effect results from the incomplete orographic blocking of relatively moist low-level air and the subsidence of drier upper-level air on the leeward side of the mountains. Foehn occurrence on the east coast can also occur when hot, north-westerly winds blow from the interior (even when there is little moisture on the windward side), because the air heats up faster as it descends onto the plains than it cooled as it ascended the ranges.

Typically between 60 km/h (37 mph) to 70 km/h (43 mph), sometimes they may be brought on by a large polar air mass from the south-west of the continent in the Southern Ocean which moves east or north-eastward across Victoria towards the east coast. Moreover, temperatures on the lee of the Great Dividing Range tend to rise substantially (due to a katabatic effect) when cold fronts push warm and dry air from the desert across the country's eastern states and over the Range (this is generally followed by a southerly buster).

As such, the Great Dividing foehn is one the few reasons why Sydney, among other places on the coastal plain, registers high temperatures in the warm season but seldom attains cold maximum temperatures in the winter. Furthermore, when the warm season north-westerly winds strike (such as the Brickfielder), the hottest and driest areas of southeastern Australia will generally be located along the southern coastal region of NSW in the lee of the Great Dividing range and coastal escarpment due to the foehn effect. Much lower relative humidity figures would also observed in these leeward stations.

== Mechanism ==
Föhn wind illustration (Left [West]: windward side, Right [East]: leeward side).

The southeast Australian foehn is characterised by three principal features: surface winds blowing from the direction of the mountains, a marked increase in air temperature on the leeward side of the ranges, and an accompanying decrease in atmospheric moisture. As moist air ascends the windward slopes of the ranges, it cools and condenses, enhancing orographic lifting. Precipitation removes moisture from the air mass, while the release of latent heat during condensation contributes to warming. As the now drier air descends the lee slopes towards the coastal plain, it undergoes adiabatic compression and warms further.

During these conditions, an orographic cloud band known as the Föhn wall develops along the ridgelines of the southeastern highlands as moisture condenses on the windward slopes. Downwind of the mountains, a Föhn arch, consisting of a broad layer of altostratus cloud, forms within the ascending branch of a standing lee mountain wave. On weather maps, a band of clear air known as the Föhn gap can often be observed between the cloud wall and the arched cloud cover on the lee side of the Great Dividing Range. This type of foehn event is considered thermodynamically driven.

Studies have identified topographically induced atmospheric waves associated with foehn development. These form as upper-level air descends over the mountain crest and propagates into the lee as large-scale, vertically propagating gravity waves. Model simulations indicate that strong downslope motion and enhanced wind shear contribute to increased turbulence near the surface, consistent with the gusty conditions frequently observed at lee-side stations. In addition to generating foehn winds, the prevailing westerlies can suppress the development of cooling sea breezes from the northeast, preventing them from penetrating inland across parts of the eastern seaboard.

Descending motion over the coastal escarpment is typically stronger than over the main range and is associated with more pronounced wind shear. As a result, downslope winds are often strongest near the surface on the lee side of the escarpment. Smaller-scale trapped lee waves may also develop, and their occurrence, combined with strong wind shear, can generate substantial turbulence throughout the boundary layer, contributing to the intense gustiness observed at the surface. At night, the foehn effect generally weakens as a mountain breeze develops. During this process, cooler, denser air flows downslope and accumulates on the lee side of the ranges, promoting significant night-time cooling and a large diurnal temperature range.

== Distribution and regional effects ==
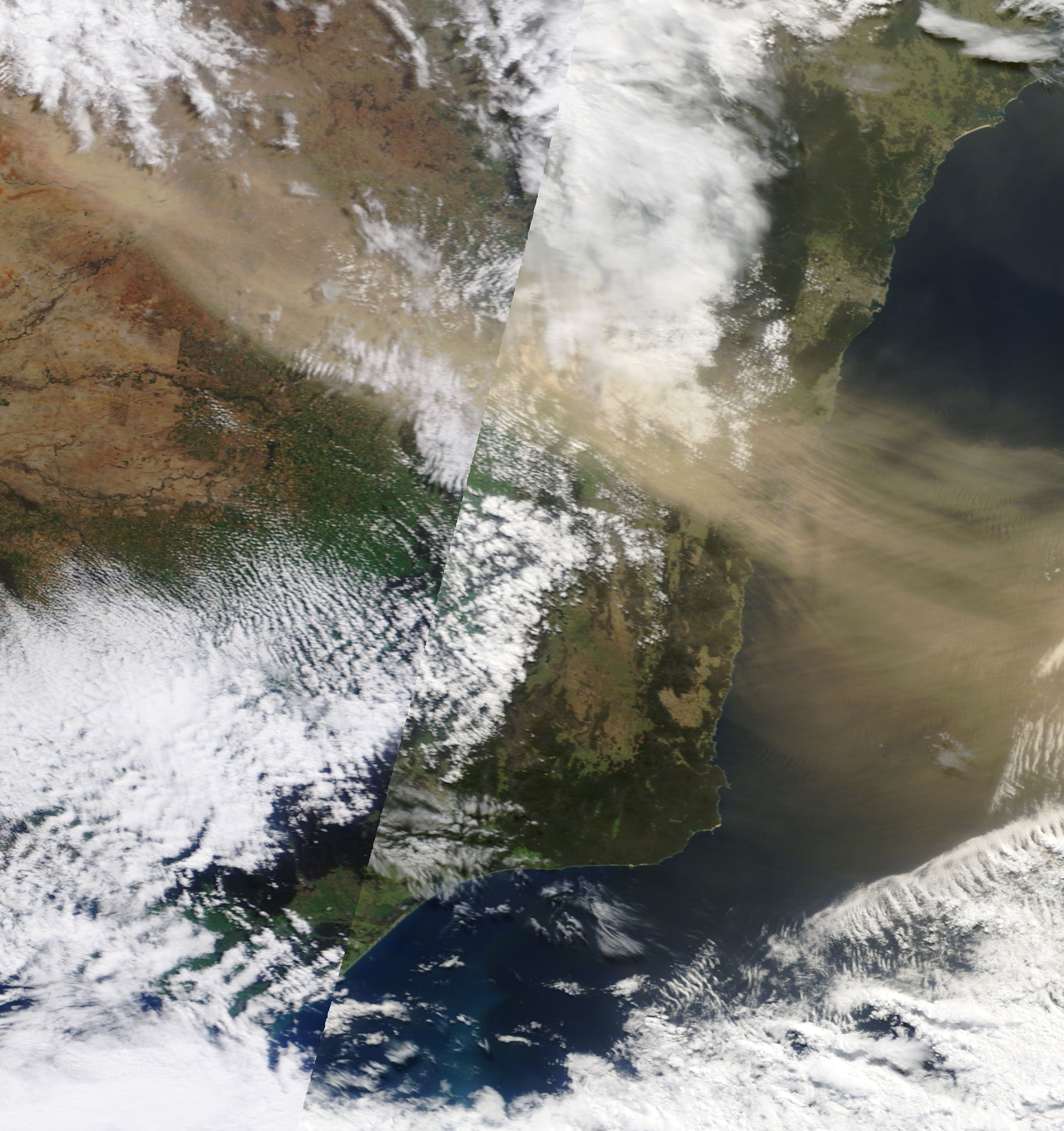
Foehn effect coinciding with the 2009 Australian dust storm (notice the cloud streets forming on the slopes).

The Great Dividing Range foehn is most commonly observed in southeastern New South Wales, east of the Great Dividing Range, including the Sydney metropolitan area (particularly the Cumberland Plain), the Illawarra, parts of the Southern Highlands, the Monaro region, and the South Coast. It may also occur farther north in the Central Coast, Hunter Valley, and parts of the Mid North Coast. Foehn conditions are also observed in the East Gippsland region of Victoria (Note: Victoria is largely exposed to westerly fronts due to its south-facing position and western longitude. Consequently, East Gippsland may occasionally remain on the windward side during particularly vigorous westerly systems.) and in eastern Tasmania.

Foehn winds may also affect areas east of the Great Dividing Range in southeastern Queensland and northern New South Wales. However, the phenomenon becomes progressively less frequent north of the Central Coast. Its influence is strongest along the South Coast, which lies directly within the path of the prevailing westerlies, whose influence diminishes markedly north of approximately 35° S. In these leeward regions, precipitation is derived primarily from the Tasman Sea to the east, as the Great Dividing Range blocks many frontal systems approaching from the Southern Ocean. Consequently, winters tend to be relatively dry and summers comparatively wet, in contrast to windward regions, which generally experience drier summers and wetter winters.

In southeastern Queensland, foehn winds are associated with pre-frontal and pre-trough northwesterly flow, post-frontal west to southwesterly winds linked to anticyclonic ridging over southern Australia, and, less commonly, east coast lows in the southeast. They are most frequent during August and September in the corridor between Toowoomba and Gatton. The transect between Applethorpe and Archerfield Airport records approximately 20 foehn events annually, while the Toowoomba–Archerfield transect averages around 19 events per year. The phenomenon becomes less common farther south towards Warwick.

Areas west of the Great Dividing Range are situated on the windward side during westerly airflow and therefore do not experience a foehn effect under such conditions, instead often experiencing increased cloud cover and precipitation. Conversely, when southerly or south-easterly systems originating over the southern Tasman Sea or eastern Bass Strait are forced to rise over the ranges, foehn-like conditions may develop on the western side of the divide. (Note: Windward regions include the Riverina, South West Slopes, and North West Slopes of New South Wales, as well as most of Victoria and all of South Australia.)

=== Regional characteristics ===
Leeward zones

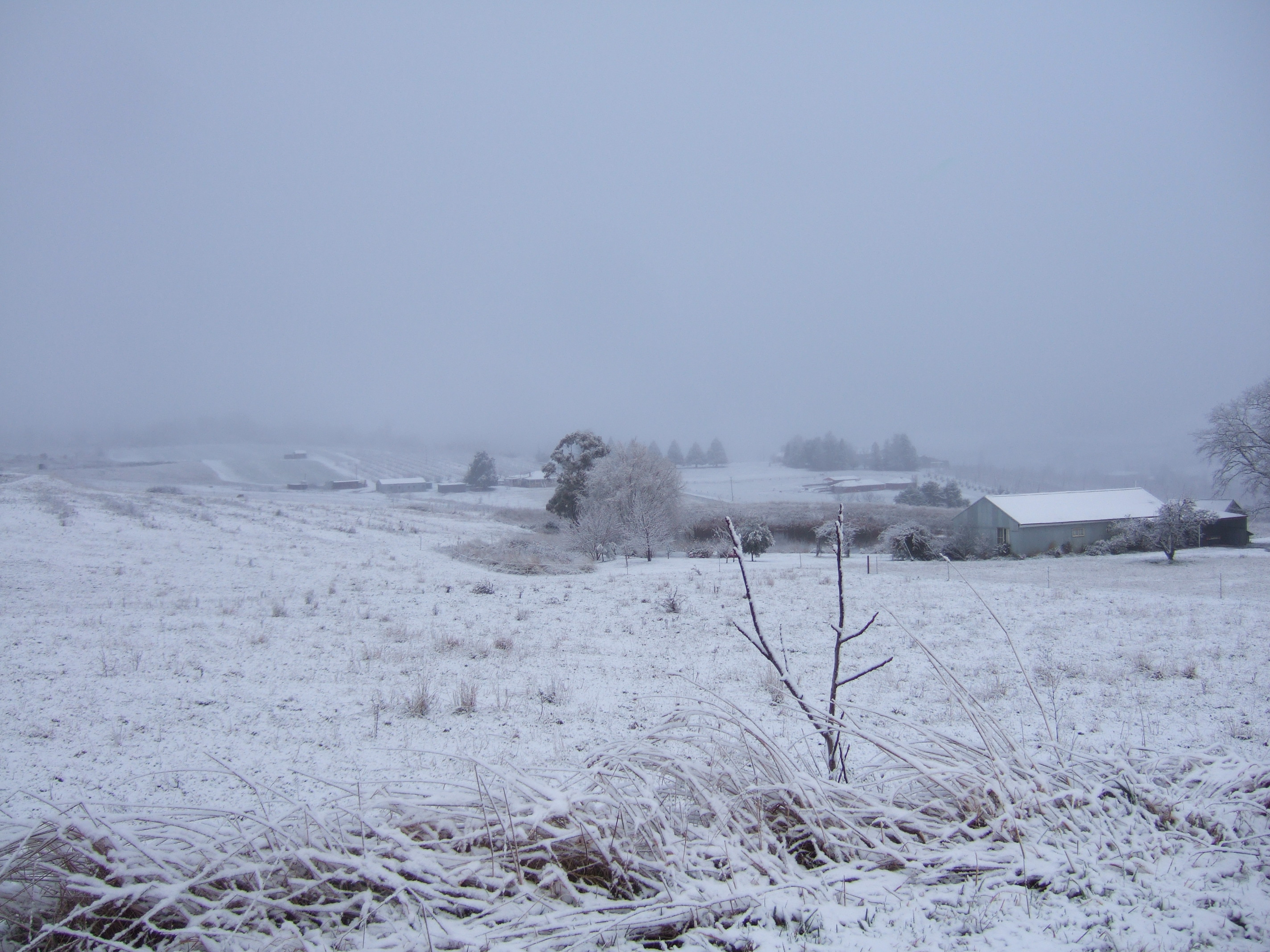
Windward - Overcast, oftentimes foggy and/or wet conditions resulting from uplift on the western slopes. Relative humidity largely in excess of 70% throughout the day. (near Orange, New South Wales)

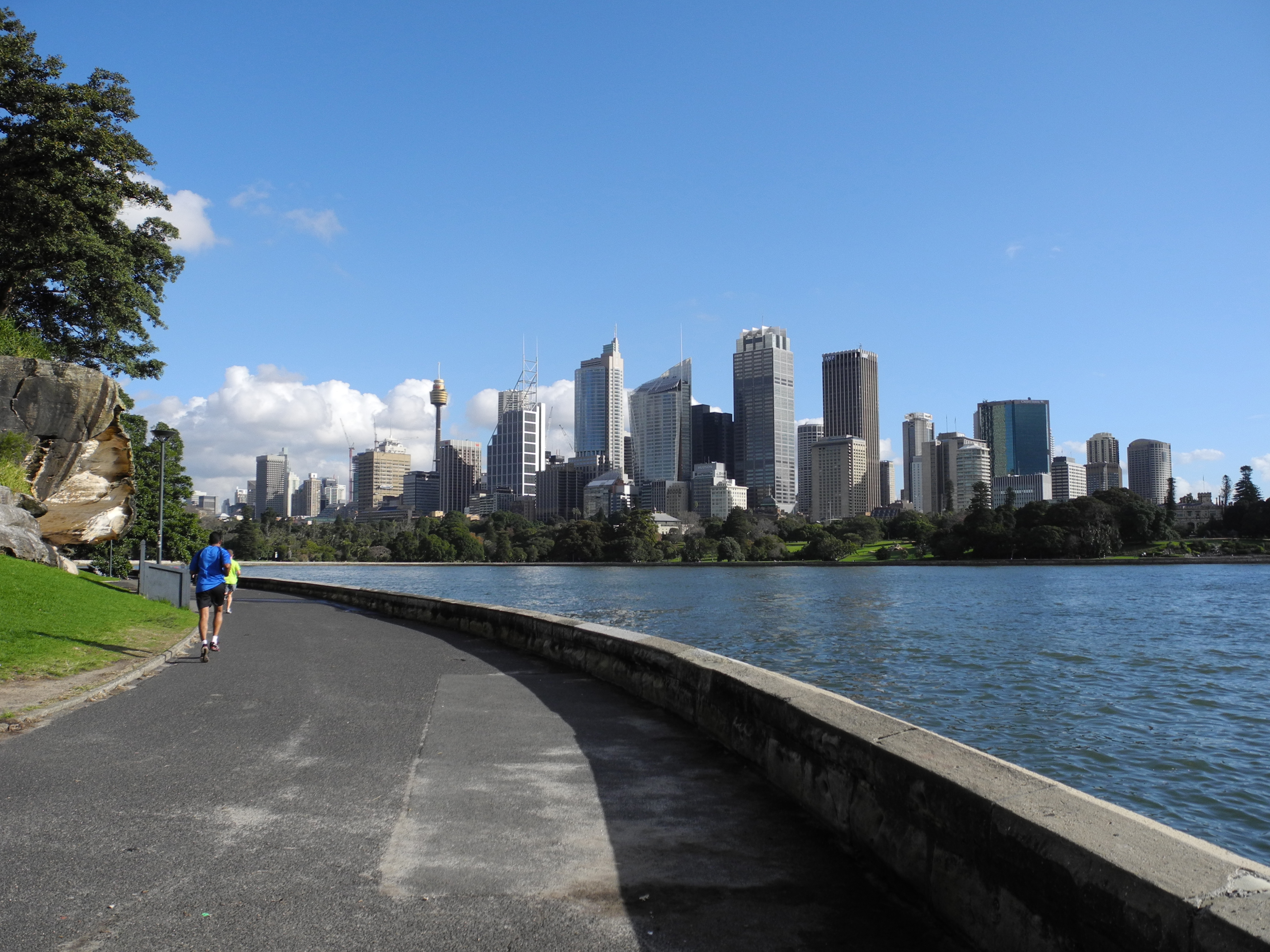
Leeward - Meanwhile, dry and mostly sunny conditions occur on the coastal plain due to compression of cold air as it descends the Ranges' leeward side. Relative humidity no greater than 40%. (Sydney CBD)

- From north to south, the westerly foehn strongly affects areas east of the Great Dividing Range (the south-eastern coastal plain or eastern seaboard), including Newcastle, Gosford, Sydney, Wollongong, Nowra, Ulladulla, Moruya, Batemans Bay, Narooma, Bega and Merimbula.
- The eastern portion of the Blue Mountains lies within the leeward zone, with localities from Lawson to Springwood generally experiencing a foehn effect.
- A strong foehn effect is observed in the Monaro region to the south, particularly in places such as Bombala, Nimmitabel and Cooma.
- During vigorous cold fronts affecting New South Wales, foehn winds may also occur in the Hunter Valley and along parts of the Mid North Coast, including Taree, Port Macquarie and Coffs Harbour.

Transitional zones

- The western portion of the Blue Mountains is transitional, including Leura, Katoomba and areas further west. Further inland, Mount Boyce, Lithgow, Bathurst, Goulburn, Bowral, Taralga, Braidwood and Canberra in the Australian Capital Territory occasionally experience foehn winds, although they are at times exposed to isolated frontal showers from the west-southwest. When these areas experience foehn winds, they tend to have greater cloud cover (including wave clouds) than locations on the coastal plain to the east. (Note: When south-westerly frontal systems are particularly strong, their associated clouds and precipitation may occasionally spill over onto the NSW coastal plain for a short period, although no more than 2 mm (0.079 in) of rainfall is usually recorded.)
- In the East Gippsland region of Victoria, transitional areas include Omeo, Bendoc, Bairnsdale, Orbost, Mallacoota and Sale. These locations are highly susceptible to south-westerly systems and may, at times, experience notable cloud cover even during true westerly flows. Owing to their more southerly latitude and westerly position, cloud cover is generally greater than in comparable locations in New South Wales.
- In Tasmania, Hobart, New Norfolk, Scamander, Swansea and St Helens on the east coast, as well as Oatlands, Ouse and Bothwell in the Midlands, lie downwind of the Central Highlands and are therefore prone to foehn winds, particularly during the warmer months, though they may occur at any time of year. However, because of their south-facing exposure, these locations remain susceptible to south-westerly systems and may occasionally experience cloud cover associated with westerly flows.

== Hazards and impacts ==
The Great Dividing foehn can be particularly damaging to homes and may disrupt air travel through flight cancellations and delays, in addition to causing discomfort. Although these winds often raise air temperatures, the accompanying strong gusts can increase the wind chill effect, making conditions feel cooler than the actual temperature.

The Australian foehn has also affected international sporting events and recreational aviation. In 2007, a light aircraft crashed in the Central Highlands during severe winds in a region prone to mountain-wave activity. Similar to the Santa Ana winds of California, foehn winds may increase bushfire danger during the warmer months because of their dry and gusty characteristics.

Foehn winds have been associated with headaches, depression, and suicidal ideation, although evidence for such effects remains inconclusive. More recent studies examining migraine incidence during Chinook wind events have suggested that there may be a relationship between foehn winds and certain health effects.

== Notable observations ==
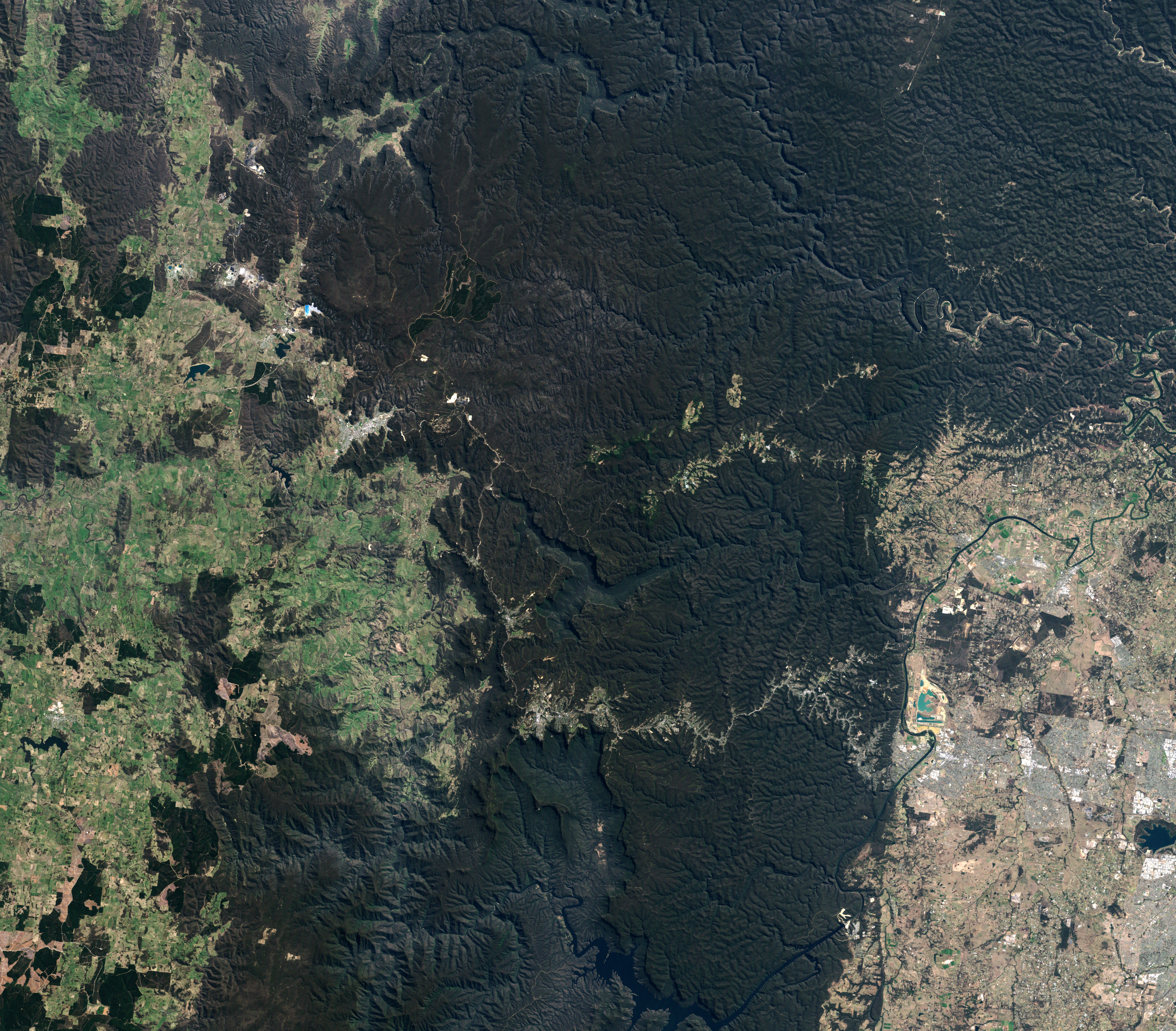
In September, when the foehn effect is usually strong, green pastures on the windward side (left, Central Tablelands) can be contrasted from the dry landscape on the leeward (right, Greater Western Sydney).

- 28 May 2000 was a striking example of the 'divided' weather between the western and eastern faces of the range. On the western face, Hunters Hill in Victoria registered a maximum temperature of just −0.7 °C (30.7 °F), whereas Cooma Airport on the eastern face reached 7.3 °C (45.1 °F). These stations are at altitudes of 981 metres (3,219 ft) and 930 metres (3,050 ft) respectively. Furthermore, Thredbo Village reached a maximum of −0.5 °C (31.1 °F); this is warmer than that recorded at Hunters Hill, despite being over 400 metres (1,300 ft) higher in altitude; whereas Cabramurra at a more similar altitude only topped at −3.0 °C (26.6 °F).
- On 29 September 2000, a remarkable foehn event was recorded in the lee of the Blue Mountains region in Sydney, where maximum temperatures at Penrith, Badgerys Creek, Bankstown Airport, and Sydney Airport were around 10 °C (18 °F) above average. The elevated temperatures again coexisted with the inflow of significantly drier air. Simultaneously, the leeward stations in the southern New South Wales coast showed a sharp increase in temperature (9°C in 2 hours) and a decrease in relative humidity. Similar warming and drying were also observed further inland at Cooma, Braidwood, Canberra, and Bombala.
- On 29 May 2007, temperatures at Sale on the leeward side of the ranges were approximately 4–9 °C (7–16 °F) higher than those at Melbourne and Wangaratta, which lay on the upwind side. During this event, Sale recorded a maximum temperature above 24 °C (75 °F), while Melbourne and Wangaratta struggled to exceed 12 °C (54 °F). Relative humidity was 31% at Sale, compared with 80% to 90% at Melbourne and Wangaratta. Unusually warm and dry conditions were also recorded at Bairnsdale, Orbost, Latrobe Valley, and Nowa Nowa, where temperatures reached 24 °C (75 °F), 24.2 °C (76 °F), 22.9 °C (73 °F), and 22.6 °C (73 °F), respectively. These observations were consistent with the position of the foehn gap and foehn arch.
- On 2 April 2008, maximum temperatures on the Gippsland coast coexisted with peak wind speeds from the northwest that gusted to 75 km/h. Temperatures at Bairnsdale, Latrobe Valley, and Nowa Nowa were 2°–4°C higher than average, with reductions in relative humidity also being observed.
- On 28 April 2008, prevailing winds were predominantly westerly, with the hottest and driest conditions in southeastern Australia occurring along the coastal fringe of southern New South Wales, in the lee of the Great Dividing Range. Temperatures on the windward side of the mountains were around 8 °C (14 °F) below average, whereas temperatures on the leeward side peaked at only about 1 to 2 °C (1.8 to 3.6 °F) below average, indicating a positive temperature anomaly of approximately 6 to 7 °C (11 to 13 °F).
- During the evening of 18 September 2008, temperatures at Mount Nowa Nowa and Bairnsdale rose after sunset, while relative humidity displayed the opposite trend throughout the night. On 19 September, relatively warm and dry conditions persisted along the Gippsland coast, in contrast to conditions on the upwind side of the ranges.
- On 27 October 2008, foehn wind dynamics were observed over the Gippsland region to the southeast of the Australian Capital Territory on the lee of the ranges, associated with northwesterly winds over southern New South Wales. These downwind regions experienced lower humidity levels and higher than average temperatures. The temperature at Orbost reached 32 °C (90 °F); the temperature at Mount Nowa Nowa rose to 26 °C (79 °F); Bega reached 36 °C (97 °F), which is approximately 14 °C (25 °F) above the average maximum temperature for October–November. At Moruya, the temperature rose to a maximum of 35.4 °C (96 °F). Similar but less pronounced effects were also observed in Green Cape, Bombala, and Cooma. In contrast, Albury, which is on the windward side of the ranges, only reached a maximum of 27.7 °C (82 °F).
- On 23 August 2012, a foehn effect caused Sydney to record its 3rd warmest August day on record where it reached 29.0 °C (84 °F) at the CBD and 30.0 °C (86 °F) at Sydney Airport.
- On 18 July 2016, Mallacoota reached an unseasonable high of 23.5 °C (74 °F) due to the foehn effect, a record warm winter day for that region in Victoria.
- On 20 September 2023, during a heatwave in southeast Australia, Gabo Island, Ulladulla and Montague Island recorded highs of 32.1 °C (90 °F), 35.4 °C (96 °F) and 33.4 °C (92 °F), respectively, due to strong foehn winds on the leeward side of the mountains. Western Sydney surpassed 35.0 °C (95 °F), and Sydney Airport recorded its highest September temperature at 35.9 °C (97 °F).
- On 9 December 2023, strong westerly foehn winds descending from the Blue Mountains contributed to extreme heat across Western Sydney during an early-summer heatwave. Temperatures approached 45 °C (113 °F) in some western suburbs, with the exceptional heat attributed to the combined influence of the foehn effect and the urban heat island effect, which made the western Sydney Basin substantially hotter than surrounding areas.
- On 30 August 2024, hot foehn winds on the eastern seaboard caused Sydney Airport to reach a winter record of 31.5 °C (88.7 °F).
- On 27 November 2024, due to the foehn effect, Sydney Airport reached 38.1 °C (100.6 °F) at 12:15pm, which made it the hottest place in the world at that time.

== See also ==
- Brickfielder
- Zonda wind
- Nor'west arch
