= Foehn wind =

Dry downslope wind in the lee of mountains

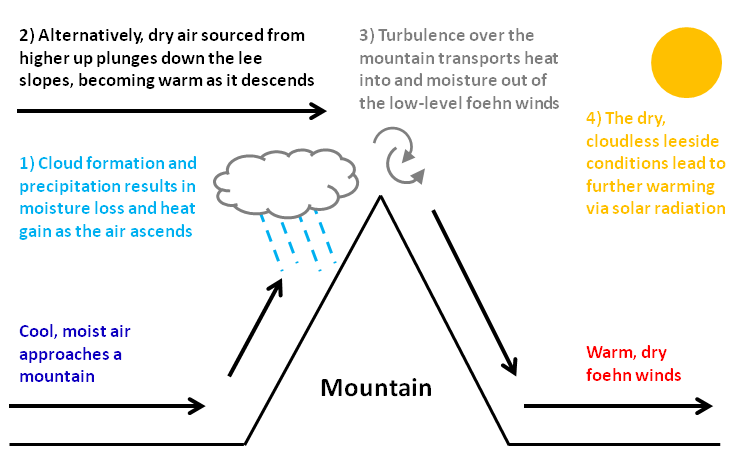
The causes of the Foehn effect in the lee of mountains (adapted from:)

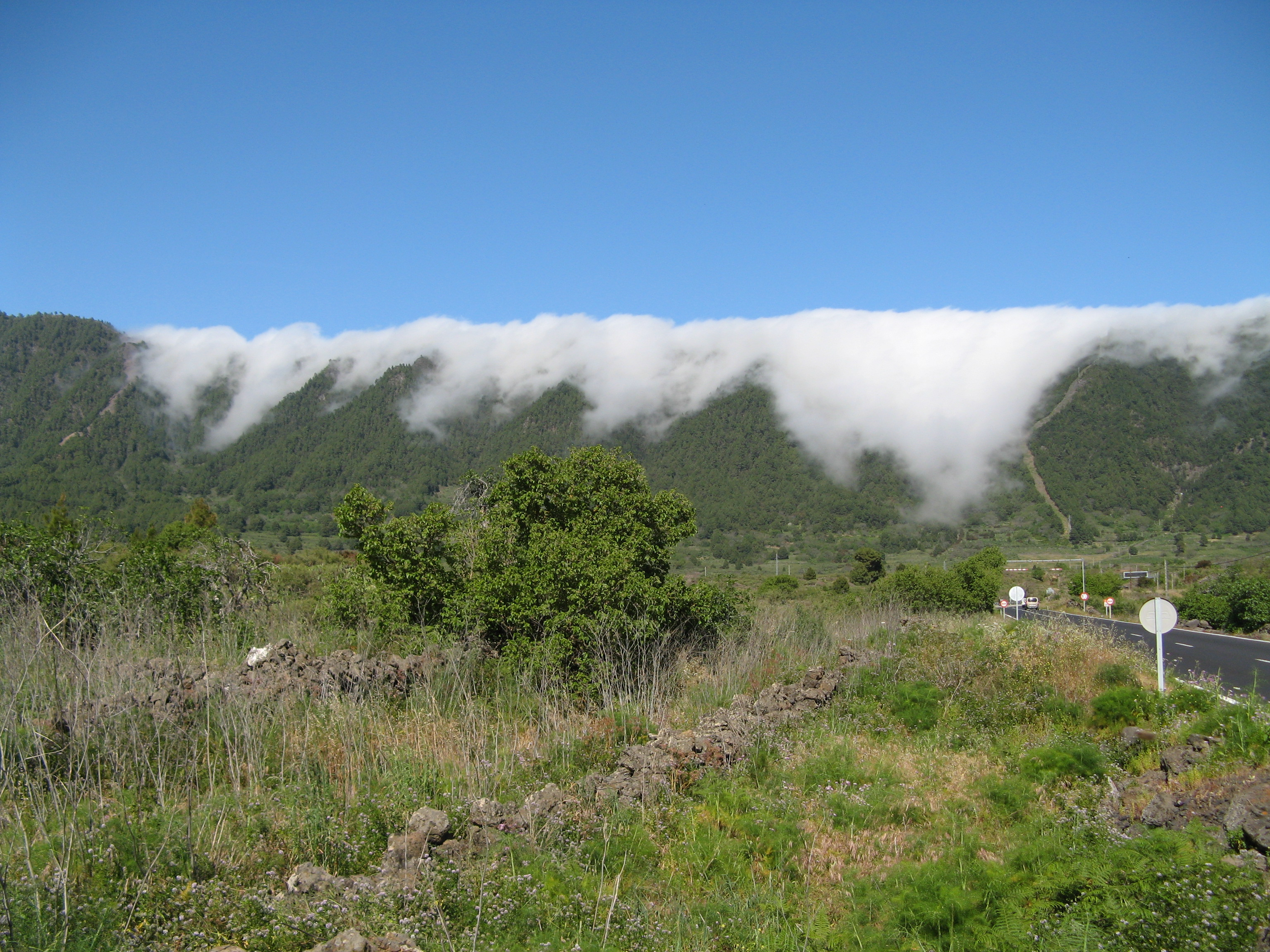
Dissolving Föhn clouds over Cumbre Nueva, La Palma, at an elevation of 1,400 m (4,600 ft)

A Foehn, or Föhn (German pronunciation: [føːn]; UK: /fɜːn/, US: /feɪn/ fayn, US also /fʌn, fɜːrn/ fu(r)n), is a type of dry, relatively warm downslope wind in the lee of a mountain range. It is a rain shadow wind that results from the subsequent adiabatic warming of air that has dropped most of its moisture on windward slopes (see orographic lift). As a consequence of the different adiabatic lapse rates of moist and dry air, the air on the leeward slopes becomes warmer than equivalent elevations on the windward slopes.

Foehn winds can raise temperatures by as much as 14 °C (25 °F) in just a matter of hours. Switzerland, southern Germany, and Austria have a warmer climate due to the Foehn, as moist winds off the Mediterranean Sea blow over the Alps.

== Etymology ==
The name Foehn (German: Föhn, pronounced [ˈføːn]) arose in the Alpine region. Originating from Latin (ventus) favonius, a mild west wind of which Favonius was the Roman personification and probably transmitted by Romansh: favuogn or just fuogn, the term was adopted as Old High German: phōnno. In the Southern Alps, the phenomenon is known as Föhn but also Italian: favonio and fen in Serbo-Croatian and Slovene. The German word Föhn (pronounced the same way) also means 'hairdryer', while the word Fön is a genericized trademark today owned by AEG. The form phon is used in French-speaking parts of Switzerland as well as in Northern Italy.

The name Föhn was originally used to refer to the south wind which blows during the winter months and brings thaw conditions to the northern side of the Alps. Because Föhn later became a generic term that was extended to other mountain ranges around the world that experience similar phenomena, the name "Alpine föhn" (Alpenföhn) was coined for the Föhns of the Alpine region.

== Causes ==
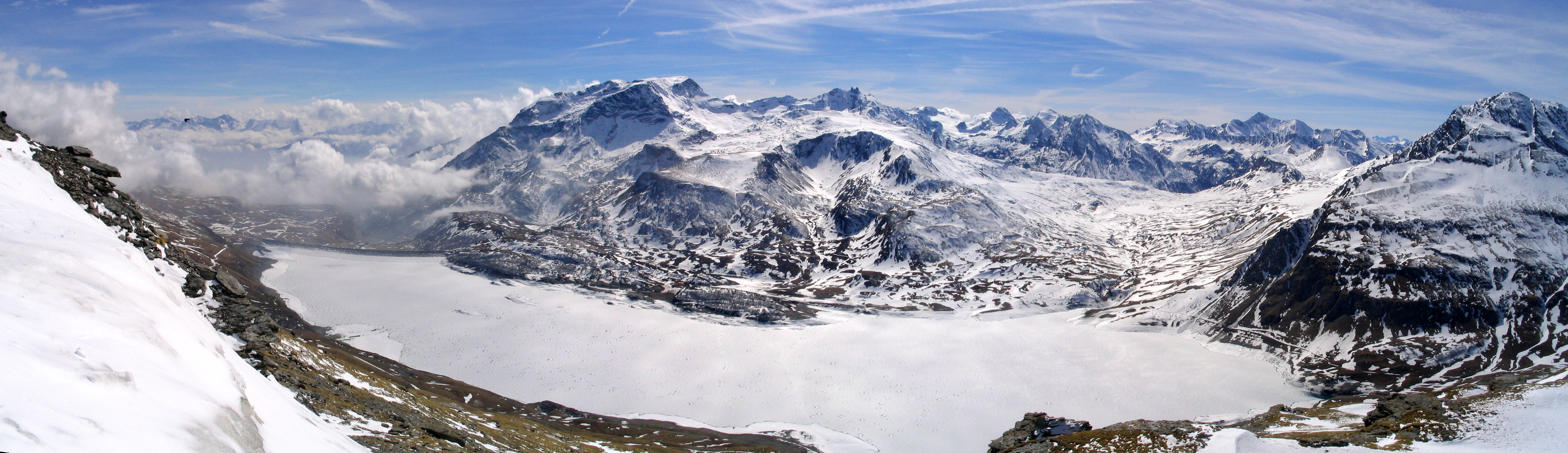
The warm moist air from northern Italy is blocked on the windward side, loses much of its water vapor content, and descends on the French plateau and valley of the Mont-Cenis range in the Maurienne valley.

There are four known causes of the Foehn warming and drying effect. These mechanisms often act together, with their contributions varying depending on the size and shape of the mountain barrier and on the meteorological conditions, such as the upstream wind speed, temperature and humidity.

=== Condensation and precipitation ===
When winds blow over elevated terrain, air forced upwards expands and cools due to the decrease in pressure with height. Since colder air can hold less water vapor, moisture condenses to form clouds and precipitates as rain or snow on the mountain's upwind slopes. The change of state from vapor to liquid water releases latent heat energy which heats the air, partially countering the cooling that occurs as the air rises. The subsequent removal of moisture as precipitation renders this heat gain by the air irreversible, leading to the warm, dry, Foehn conditions as the air descends in the mountain's lee. This mechanism has become a popular textbook example of atmospheric thermodynamics. However, the common occurrence of 'dry' Foehn events, where there is no precipitation, implies there must be other mechanisms.

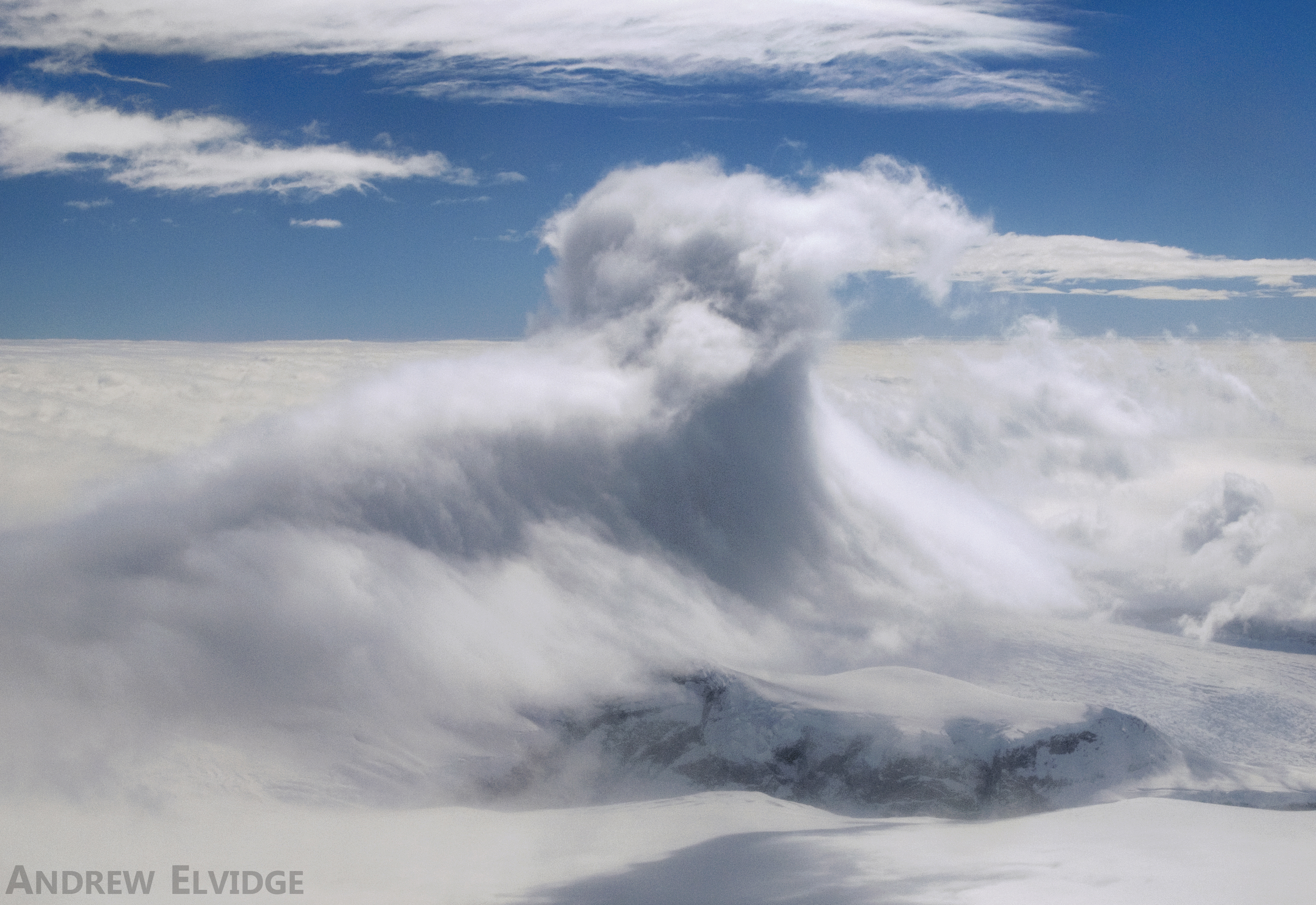
Rotor cloud revealing overturning and turbulence above the lee slopes of the Antarctic Peninsula during a westerly Foehn event

=== Isentropic draw-down ===
Isentropic draw-down is the draw-down of warmer, drier air from aloft. When the approaching winds are insufficiently strong to propel the low-level air up and over the mountain barrier, the airflow is said to be 'blocked' by the mountain and only air higher up near mountain-top level is able to pass over and down the lee slopes as Foehn winds. These higher source regions provide Foehn air that becomes warmer and drier on the leeside after it is compressed with descent due to the increase in pressure towards the surface.

=== Mechanical mixing ===
When river water passes over rocks, turbulence is generated in the form of rapids, and white water reveals the turbulent mixing of the water with the air above. Similarly, as air passes over mountains, turbulence occurs and the atmosphere is mixed in the vertical. This mixing generally leads to a downward warming and upward moistening of the cross-mountain airflow, and consequently to warmer, drier Foehn winds in the valleys downwind.

=== Radiative warming ===
Dry Foehn conditions are responsible for the occurrence of rain shadows in the lee of mountains, where clear, sunny conditions prevail. This often leads to greater daytime radiative (solar) warming under Foehn conditions. This type of warming is particularly important in cold regions where snow or ice melt is a concern or where avalanches are a risk.

== Effects ==
Winds of this type are also called "snow-eaters" for their ability to make snow and ice melt or sublimate rapidly. This is a result not only of the warmth of Foehn air, but also its low relative humidity. Accordingly, Foehn winds are known to contribute to the disintegration of ice shelves in the polar regions.

Foehn winds are notorious among mountaineers in the Alps, especially those climbing the Eiger, for whom the winds add further difficulty in ascending an already difficult peak.

They are also associated with the rapid spread of wildfires, making some regions which experience these winds particularly fire-prone.

== Purported physiological effects ==
Anecdotally, residents in areas of frequent Foehn winds have reported experiencing a variety of illnesses ranging from migraines to psychosis. The first clinical review of these effects was published by the Austrian physician Anton Czermak in the 19th century. A study by the Ludwig-Maximilians-Universität München found that suicide and accidents increased by 10 percent during Foehn winds in Central Europe. The causation of Föhnkrankheit (English: Foehn-sickness) is unproven. Labels for preparations of aspirin combined with caffeine, codeine and the like will sometimes include Föhnkrankheit among the indications. Evidence for effects from Chinook winds remains anecdotal, as it does for New Zealand's Nor'wester.

In some regions, Foehn winds are associated with causing circulatory problems, headaches, or similar ailments. Researchers have found, however, the Foehn wind's warm temperature to be beneficial to humans in most situations, and have theorized that the reported negative effects may be a result of secondary factors, such as changes in the electrical field or in the ion state of the atmosphere, the wind's relatively low humidity, or the generally unpleasant sensation of being in an environment with strong and gusty winds.

== Local examples ==
Regionally, these winds are known by many different names. These include:

in the Americas

- The Brookings Effect on the southwestern coast of Oregon, also known as the Chetco Effect.
- Chinook winds east of the Rocky Mountains and the Cascade Range in the United States and Canada, and north, east and west of the Chugach Mountains of Alaska, United States
- Foehn winds in the foothills of the southern Appalachian Mountains, which can be unusual compared to other Foehn winds in that the relative humidity typically changes little due to the increased moisture in the source air mass
- Mono winds in the Sierra Nevada.
- The Santa Ana winds of southern California, including the Sundowner winds of Santa Barbara, are in some ways similar to the Föhn, but originate in dry deserts as a katabatic wind. However, traditional Föhn conditions frequently prevail along the Santa Monica and Santa Ana Mountains and their respective leeward valleys, the San Fernando Valley and the Riverside County portion of the Inland Empire region.
- Puelche wind in Chile
- Suêtes on the west coast of Cape Breton Island, Nova Scotia, Canada
- Wreckhouse winds in the southwest corner of the island of Newfoundland, Newfoundland and Labrador, Canada
- Zonda winds in Argentina

in Antarctica

- Föhn wall on Signy Island, South Orkneys

in Asia

- Garmesh, Garmij, Garmbaad (lit. transl. Warm wind): (Persian: گرمباد, Gilaki: گرمش) in Gilan region (near the Alborz) in the south west of Caspian Sea in Iran.
- In winter, a Foehn effect occurs in the West Azerbaijan province, Iran (around Lake Urmia) as manifested by the province's dry winters relative to those in the windward part of the region (Northern Iraq or Kurdistan Province and Hakkâri Province in Turkey). For example, the winter rainfall of Urmia and Salmas in Iranian Azerbaijan is much lower than Batifa and Soran in Iraqi Kurdistan, and Hakkâri in the Hakkâri Province, which are roughly on the same latitude but are on the windward side of the Zagros Mountains.
- Loo in Indo-Gangetic Plain
- Warm Braw in the Schouten Islands, northern Papua, Indonesia.
- Wuhan in China is famously known as one of the Three Furnaces on account of its extremely hot weather in summer resulting from the adiabatic warming effect created by mountains further south.
- Laos wind (Vietnamese: gió Lào), hot-dry west wind (Vietnamese: gió tây khô nóng) in northern and central Vietnam.

in Europe

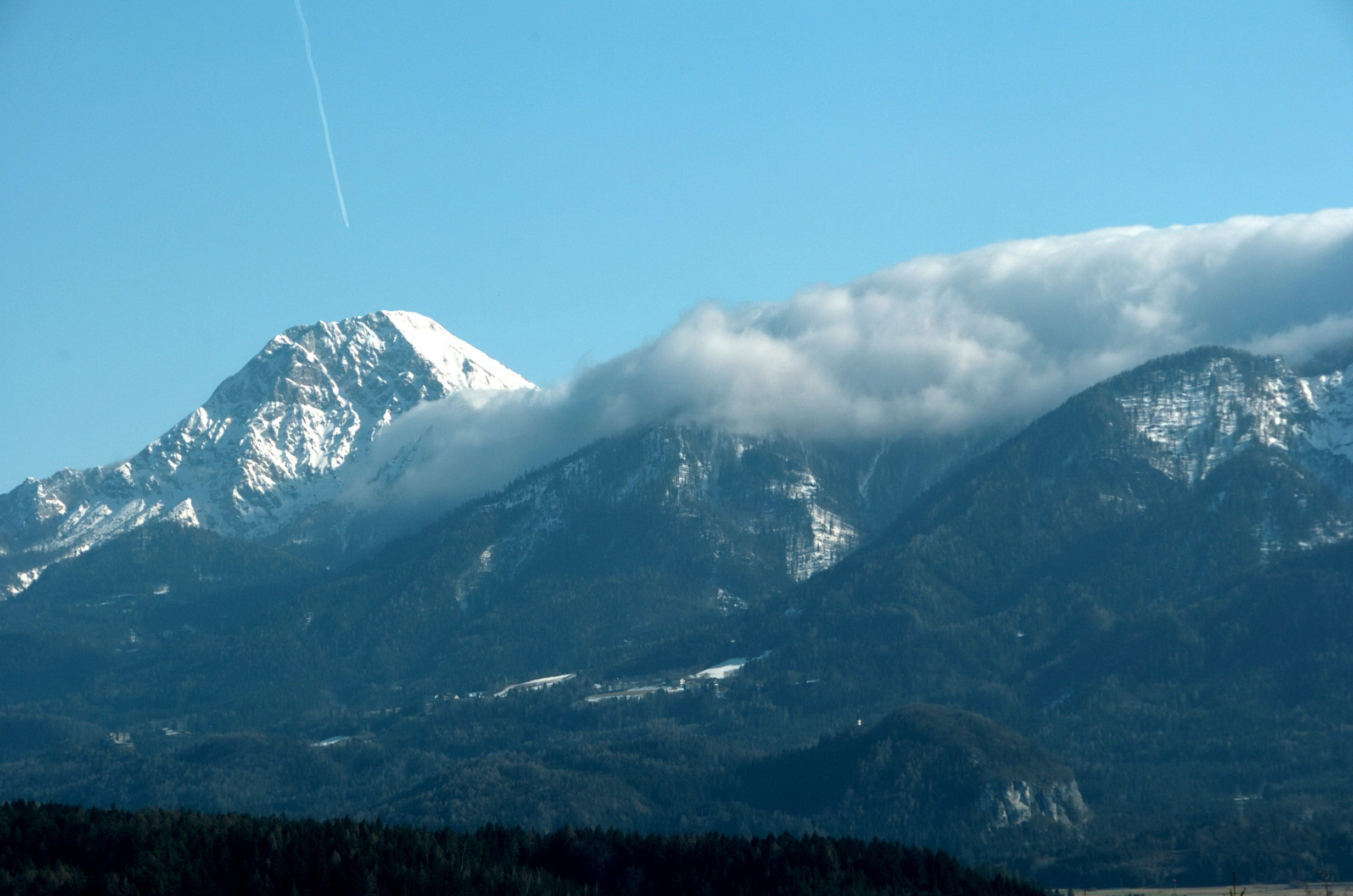
Foehn clouds upon the Karawanken mountain range, Carinthia, Austria

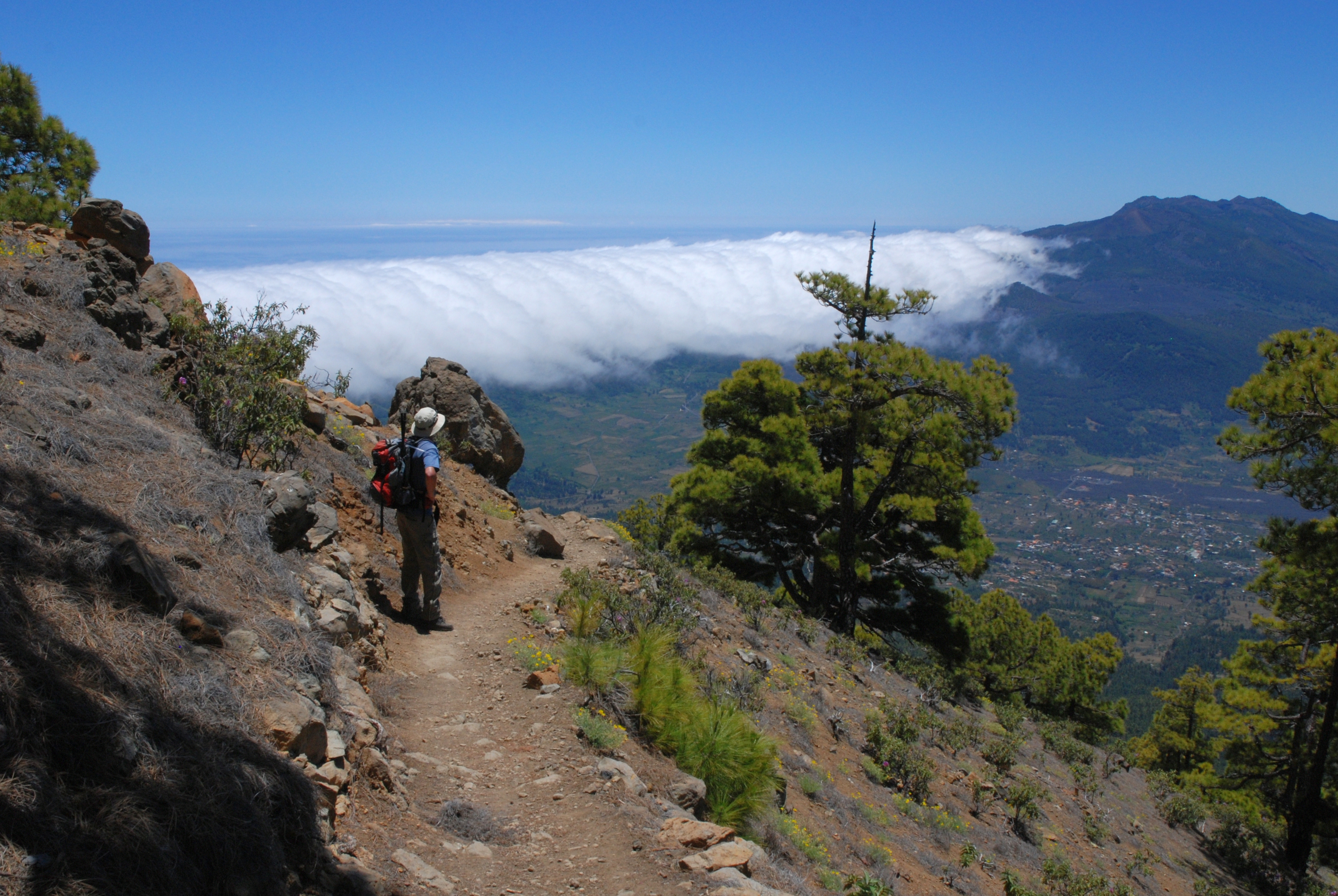
Foehn clouds over La Palma, Spain

- Favonio in Ticino and north-western Italy due to western and northern winds crossing the Alps (mostly in winter)
- Garbino in the Adriatic coast of Italy due to south-western winds crossing the Apennine Mountains (mostly in fall and winter)
- Fen in northwest Slovenia
- Fønvind in South Norway, in particular Central Norway, resulting in extreme winter warming, including Scandinavia's warmest winter temperature in Sunndalsøra.
- Fogony in the Catalan Pyrenees
- Föhn or Foehn in Austria, southern Germany, Switzerland, France and Liechtenstein
- Föhn in Ostrobothnia and Western Lapland in Finland as moist air crosses Scandinavian Mountains and dries up.
- Halny in the Carpathian Mountains, southern Poland and northern Slovakia
- The Helm Wind, on the Pennines in the Eden Valley, Cumbria, England
- Hnjúkaþeyr in Icelandic
- Lodos wind, causing warm temperatures in the leeward side of mountains in the mild-winter climate of the Aegean Sea, Greece and western Turkey, as well as unusually mild temperatures in the cool or moderately cold winter climates north of the Marmara Sea, such as Istanbul, Adapazarı and Zonguldak.
- Košava (Koshava) wind in Serbia that blows along the river Danube
- Nortada in Cascais, and most notoriously in Guincho Beach, making it one of the best windsurfing spots in Europe
- Ponentà in Valencia (eastern Spain)
- Terral in Málaga (southern Spain)
- Viento del Sur (Southern Wind) or Hego haizea in Basque in the Cantabrian region (northern Spain)

in Oceania

- The Great Dividing foehn in southeast Australia, leeward of the Great Dividing Range, observed in the coastal plains of New South Wales, and also in eastern Victoria and eastern Tasmania.
- The Nor'wester in Hawkes Bay, Canterbury, and Otago, New Zealand

== Gallery ==
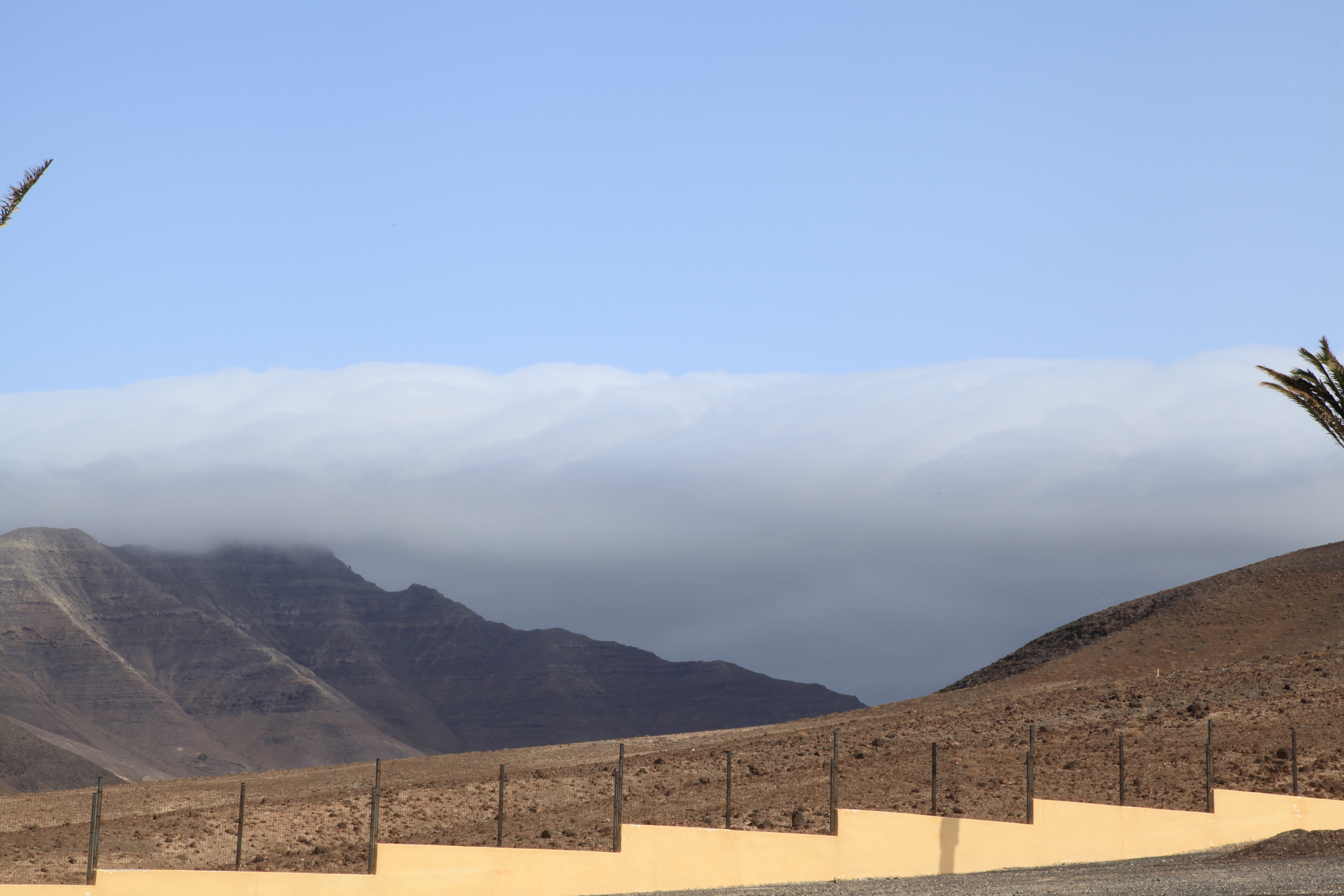
Foehn over Carretera Punta de Jandía in Morro Jable, Pájara, Fuerteventura, Canary Islands

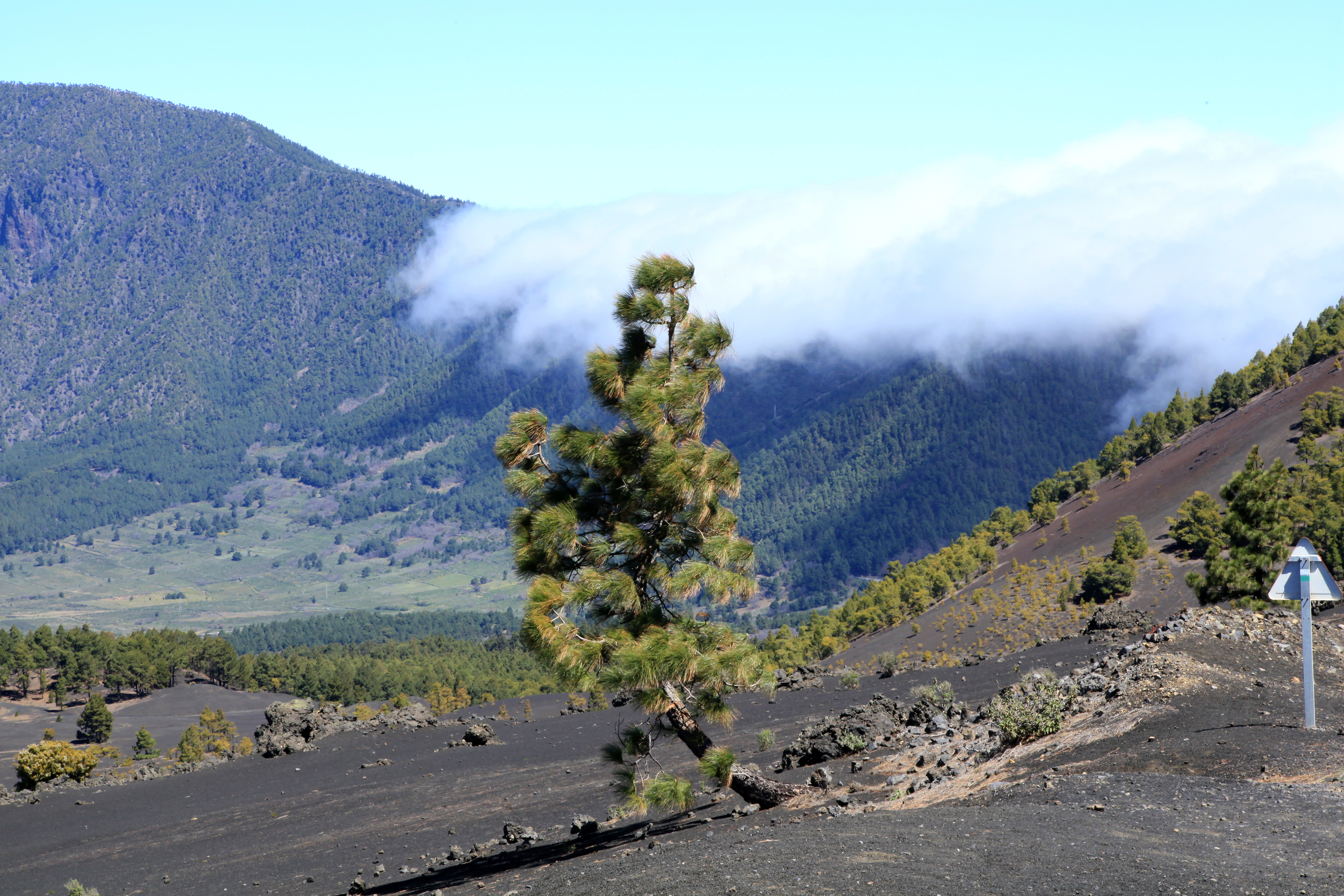
Dissolving clouds from Foehn wind over the Cumbre Nueva in El Paso, La Palma, Canary Island

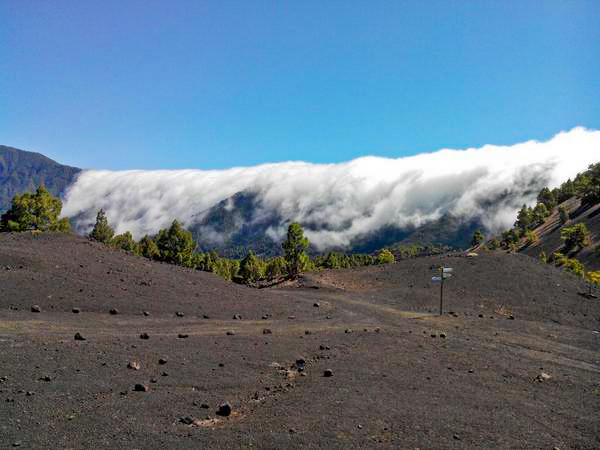
Foehn over Llano del Jable

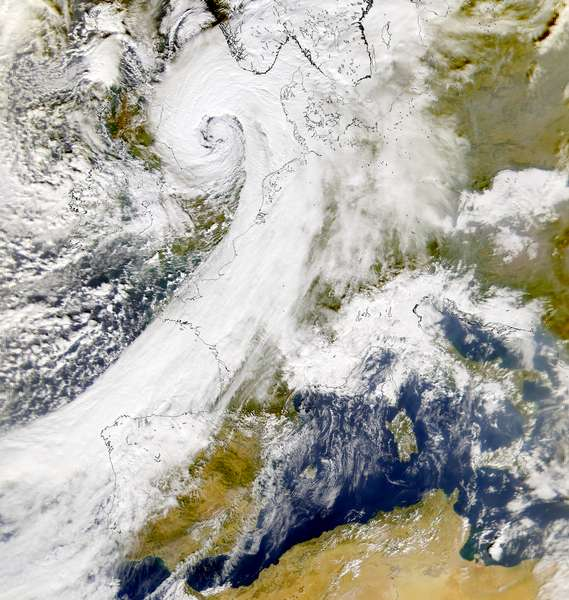
Foehn can be initiated when deep low-pressure systems move into Europe, drawing moist Mediterranean air over the Alps.

== See also ==
- Alpine climate
- Anabatic wind
- Chinook wind
- Föhn cloud
- Katabatic winds
- Lee wave
- Meteorology
