= Alpine föhn =

Regional wind

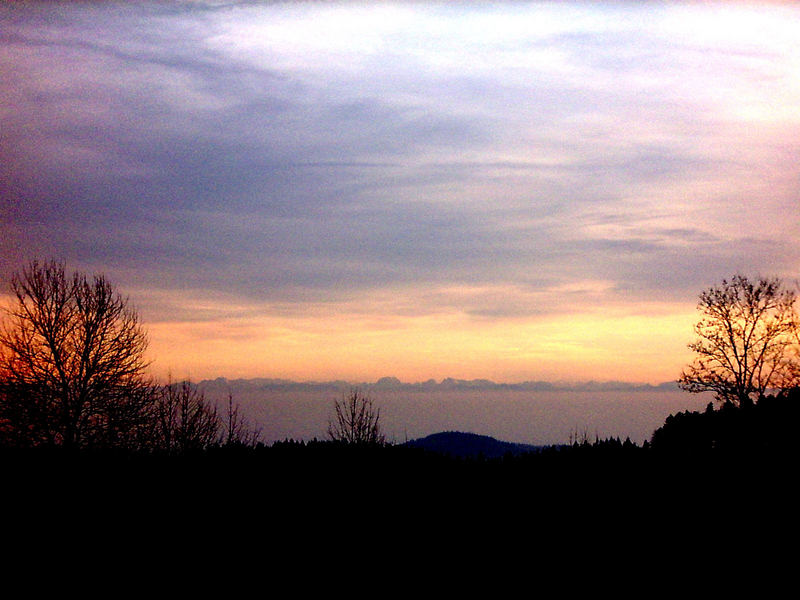
View of the Bavarian Alpine Foreland with a south föhn. Taken about 20 km (12 mi) east of Regensburg with visibility of around 200 km (120 mi). The Danube valley forms a natural boundary for the Alpine föhn.

The Alpine föhn (German: Alpenföhn) is the name given to the föhn wind in the Alpine region. The name föhn was originally used to refer to the south wind which blows during the winter months and brings thaw conditions to the northern side of the Alps. Because föhn later became a generic term that was extended to other mountain ranges around the world that experience similar phenomena, the name "Alpine föhn" (Alpenföhn) was coined for the föhns of the Alpine region. The wind can cause heavy storms with winds of hurricane strength and top speeds of up to 150 km/h (93 mph). The south wind on the northern side of the Alps is also called the south föhn (Südföhn), its opposite number on the south side of the Alps is also called the north föhn (Nordföhn).

Föhn conditions are known for their warm air and unusual cloud and atmospheric appearance.

== Föhns in the north Alps ==
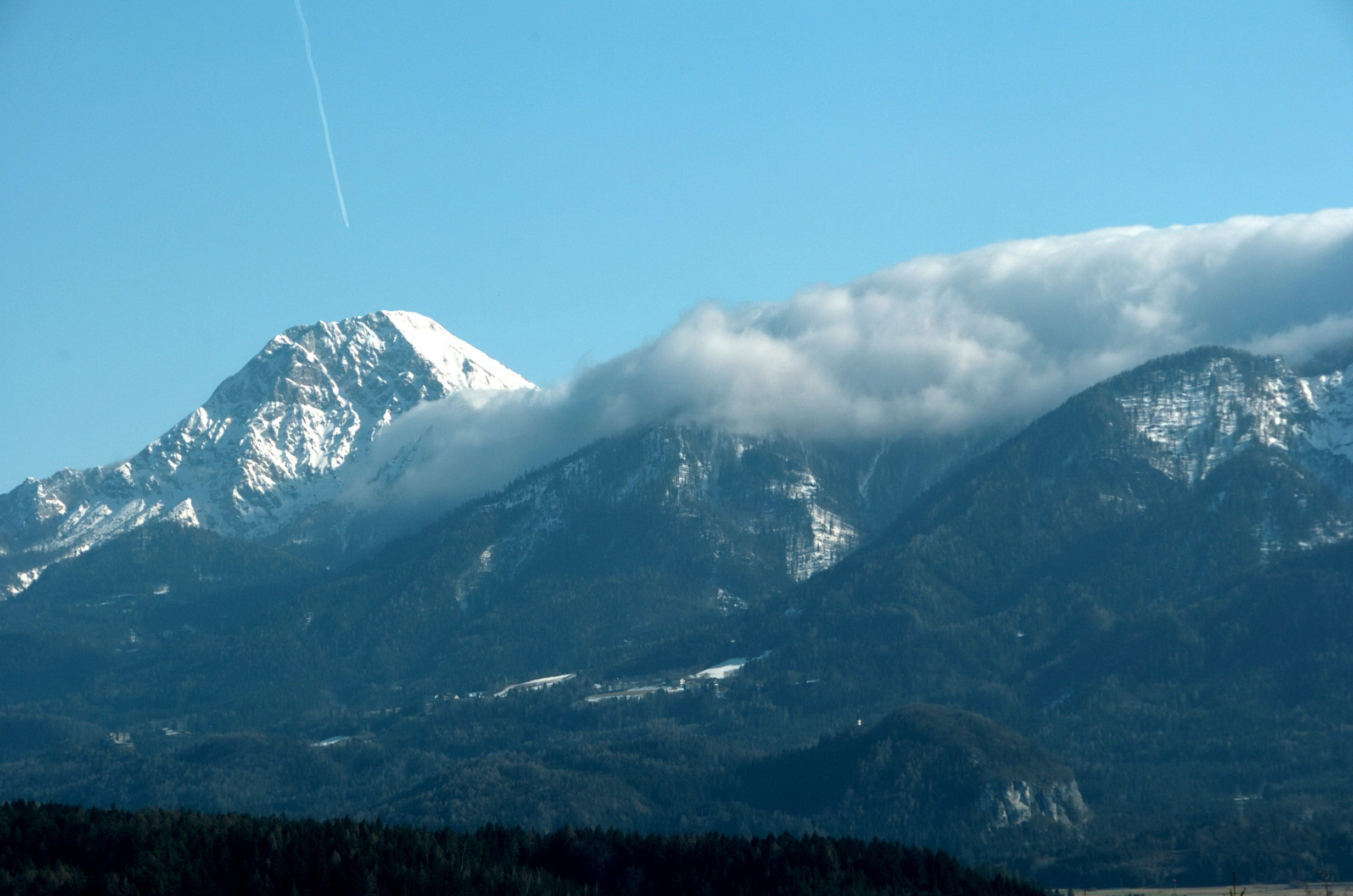
Clouds during a Jauk (south föhn) over the Carinthian Karawanks

A considerable proportion of föhn days are not accompanied by any precipitation south of the Alpine chain, so that the thermodynamic föhn theory does not explain the warm air of the Alpine föhn. The föhn phenomenon on the northern side of the Alps can, however, be explained by the fact that the air which is detectable as a föhn in the northern Alpine valleys does not come from the southern foot of the Alps, but from higher up; the windward air beneath it forms a layer of stable air and is prevented from crossing the barrier. Through the deeply incised Alpine passes, some of this relatively cool, trapped windward air reaches the north as a moderate föhn.

In Switzerland, on the other hand, the term "föhn" is used only if a clearly warm downslope wind is meant, which is caused by the additional heat of condensation (thermal energy) during periods of rainfall on the southern side of the Alps (northern side of the Alps when there is a north föhn).

The föhn-like high altitude winds are mostly large-scale, central Atlantic or African air masses from the southwest to south, which cause unusually warm conditions north of the Alps even at low wind speeds. Triggers are usually slow-moving or blocked Atlantic depressions in the area of the British Isles and North Sea, which move air radially at their outside edge, i.e. the cold front. In particularly extreme conditions, however, this also results in a valley föhn. They are föhn-like inasmuch as the moisture carried along has often been precipitated in the Pyrenees or French Alps. These southerly winds can bring Saharan dust to the Alps, for example.

In real föhn conditions, the clear temperature differences of well over 10 °C (18 °F) between the föhn area and its immediate neighbourhood, especially in radiation fog, are only explainable by föhn processes. When there is a föhn the temperatures may rise or fall by up to 25 °C (45 °F). Föhns are also responsible for quite a few winter temperature highs. On the northern side of the Alps, the föhn is associated with very good visibility due to the low humidity. In winter and spring the dry air and the high temperature encourages rapid snow melt.

== Föhns in the south Alps ==
During inverse pressure conditions, on the southern side of the Alps, a north föhn arises, known in Italian as the tramontana or tedesco ("the German"). The effects are not exactly symmetrical, as northern air has different characteristics from southern air. North föhn winds result in clouds with rain in the north, and föhn windows with possibly elevated temperatures in the south. In contrast to the föhn north of the Alps, however, the north föhn will often appear as a relatively cold storm, as this wind situation usually occurs after the passage of a cold front from the west.

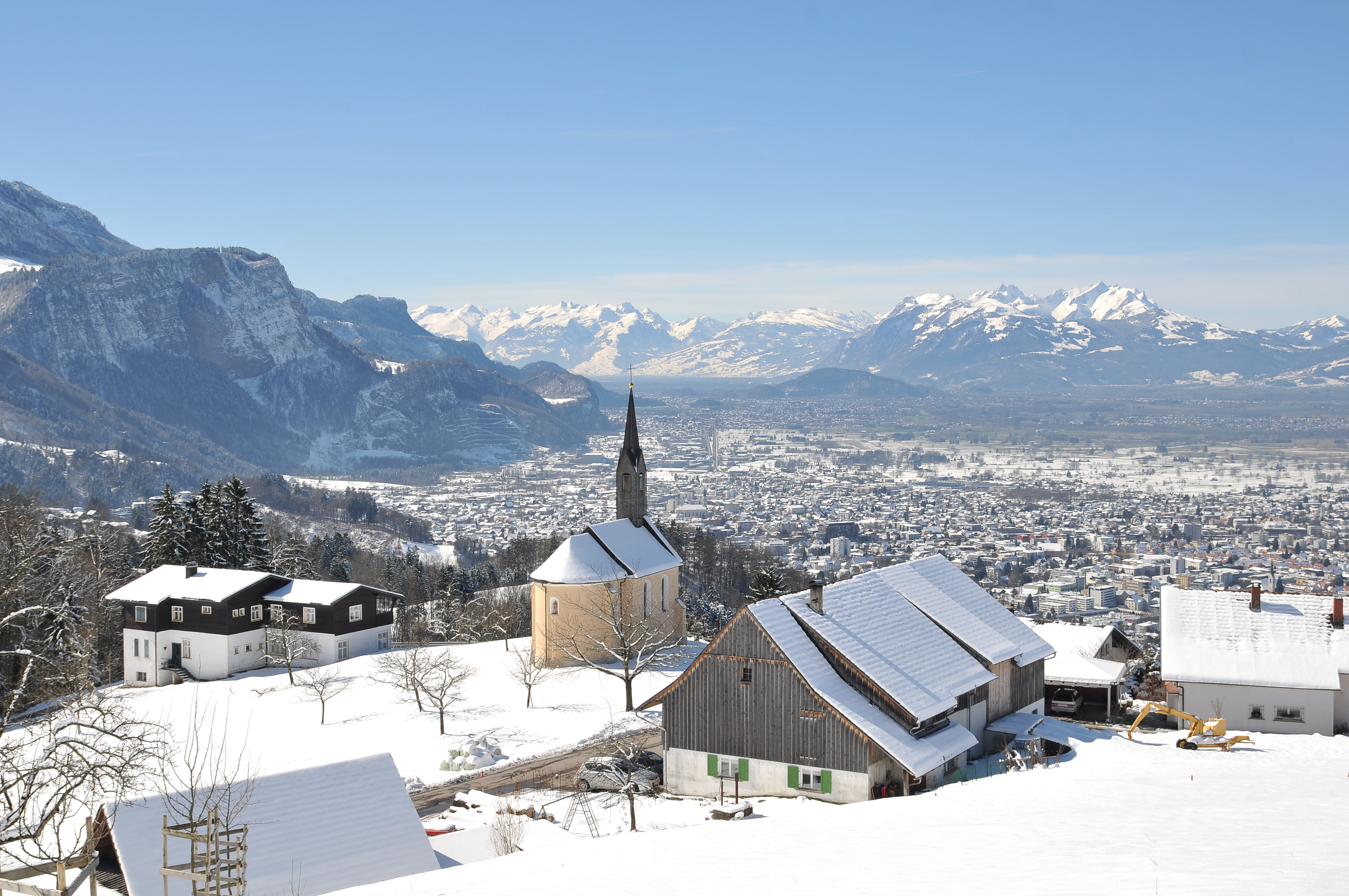
In gentle föhn conditions enormous visibility distances are possible

== Literature ==
- F. Fliri: Die Niederschlagsverteilung in den Alpen an Tagen mit starkem Südföhn in Innsbruck und in Altdorf. In: Wetter und Leben 35/1983, pp. 154–162
- K. Frey: Eine neue Ansicht über die Entwicklung des Föhns, Dissertations-Sonderdruck. Rentsch, Trimbach, 1945
- K. Frey: Der „Jahrhundertföhn“ vom 8. November 1982. Eine synoptische Betrachtung. In: Meteorologische Rundschau 37 (1984), pp. 209–220
- J. Hann: Der Föhn in den österreichischen Alpen. In: Zeit. Öster. Ges. Met. 2 (19), Vienna, 1867, pp. 433–445
- M. Kuhn (ed.): Föhnstudien. Wissenschaftliche Buchgesellschaft, Darmstadt, 1989
- J. Vergeiner: South foehn studies and a new foehn classification scheme in the Wipp and Inn valley. Dissertation. University of Innsbruck, 2004
