= Warm Braw =

Type of wind

Warm Braw is a foehn wind in the Schouten Islands north of New Guinea.
