= Nor'west arch =

Föhn cloud formation in New Zealand

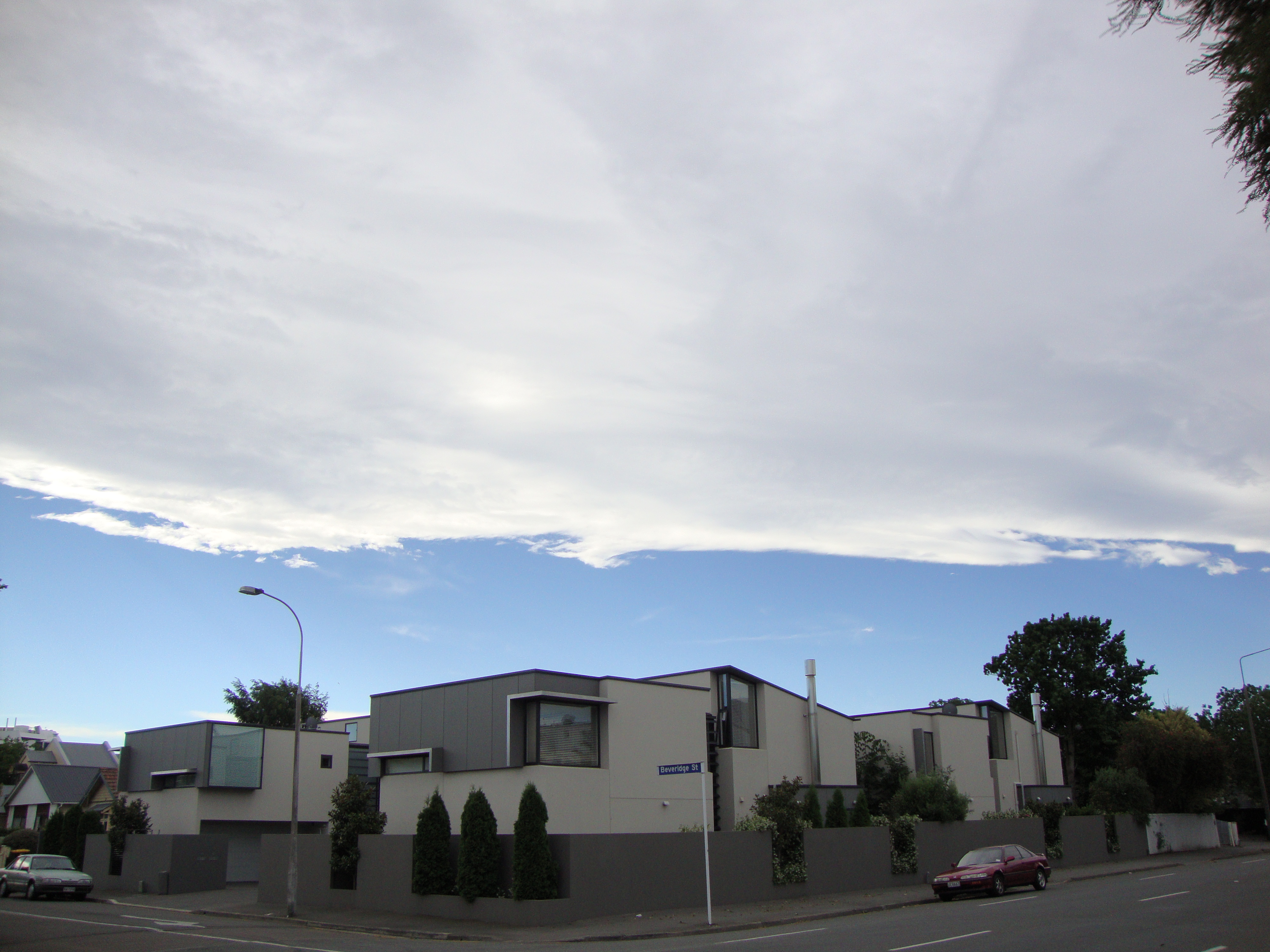
The nor'west arch, viewed from Christchurch, appears as a blue belt of clear sky to the west from which high white cloud streams.

The nor'west arch is a band of high white lenticular cloud that forms on the eastern side of New Zealand's South Island and which looks like an arch in an otherwise clear blue sky over the Southern Alps. It is accompanied by a strong hot northwesterly or northerly wind known as a "nor'wester". In Canterbury, where it is a well known feature, it is also called the Canterbury arch. It also occurs in Otago and Marlborough and east of mountain ranges along the east coast of the North Island.

Closer to the Canterbury coast, some distance from the mountains of the Southern Alps, it appears as a clear area of blue above the mountains, with white cloud streaming to the east from it. The phenomenon is similar to the Chinook arch seen in the Pacific regions of the United States and Canada.

== Formation ==
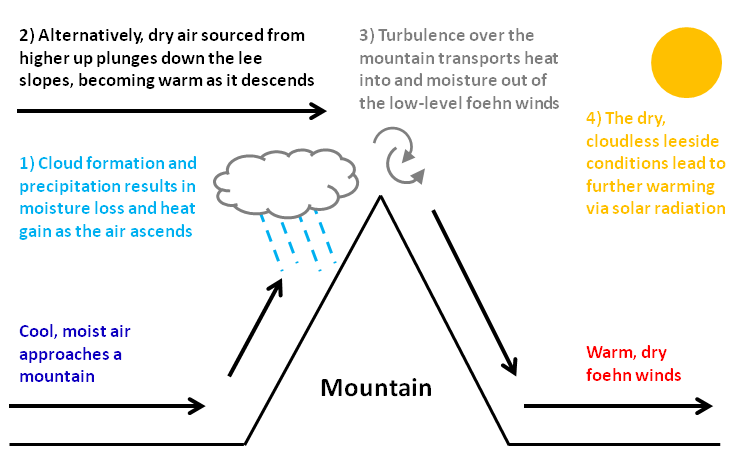
The nor'wester is a föhn wind – moist air is driven over the Southern Alps, falling as condensation on the western side, leaving the eastern plains in the rain shadow.

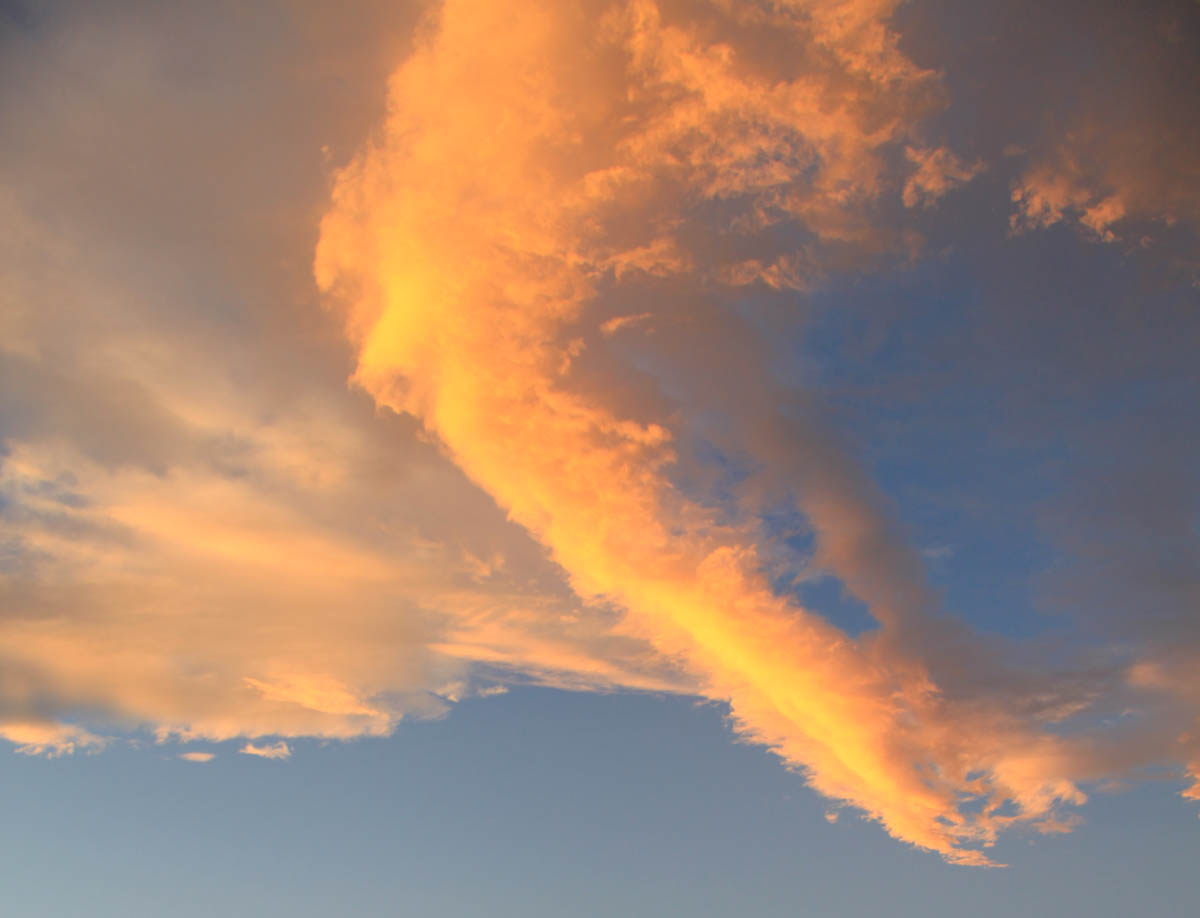
A typical Canterbury nor'west arch at sunset

The nor'west arch is a föhn cloud or a lenticular cloud. The northwesterly wind drives warm moist air from over the Tasman Sea, and it is pushed up by the presence of the Southern Alps, causing it to cool rapidly. The area to the east of the divide is in the rain shadow of the Alps; much of the moisture is dumped on the West Coast, and is responsible for the temperate rainforests found there. As the air passes over the alps, the water vapour remaining becomes visible in a band of cloud over the mountains at the top of each wave of air. From the perspective of a viewer on the eastern side, this appears as an 'arch' of cloud. The standing wave or arch is caused by the moisture condensing and becoming visible towards the top of the wave and then evaporating again as the air descends to the trough of the wave.

Nor'westers caused by cold fronts will often change within a day or two to a cool southerly wind accompanied by rain showers, as the front passes through. In mid-winter, a nor'wester is often followed by a brief but intense cold snap, frequently bringing thunder, hail, or rain and sometimes snow which may settle to sea level.

== Occurrence ==
The nor'west arch can be seen as far north as Amberley and as far south as Central Otago, but it is at its most prominent on the Canterbury Plains, due to the flat and low-lying nature of the land to the east of the mountains.

The nor'wester can blow at any time of year, but is less common in winter. Many of the strongest northerly and northwesterly winds blow ahead of cold fronts. A front lying across the South Island will often extend from northwest to southeast, reaching northern parts of the West Coast before it reaches corresponding areas on the east coast. The steep air pressure gradient ahead of the cyclonic system associated with a front gives these nor'westers their strength; they will commonly reach gale force and cause isolated damage to trees and buildings. Once every few years, a nor'wester will approach hurricane strength and cause widespread damage.

== Effects ==
The heat and lack of moisture characteristic of nor'westers play a major role in the intermittent droughts experienced by Canterbury and other regions on New Zealand's eastern coasts. The nor'wester has a deep psychological effect on many people subjected to its hot, dry nature. It has been statistically linked to increases in suicide and domestic violence.

About 10 percent of people affected by the nor’wester feel elated and wonderful. But the rest feel depressed, irritable, and lacking energy. People feel they can’t cope with everyday things. ... There is irrational anxiety and a sense of foreboding.

— Neil Cherry

== See also ==
- Lee waves
- Southeast Australian foehn
- Roaring forties
- Taieri Pet
