= Zonda wind =

Foehn wind in Argentina

Zonda wind (Spanish: viento zonda) is a regional term for the foehn wind that often occurs on the eastern slope of the Andes, in Argentina.

== Formation ==
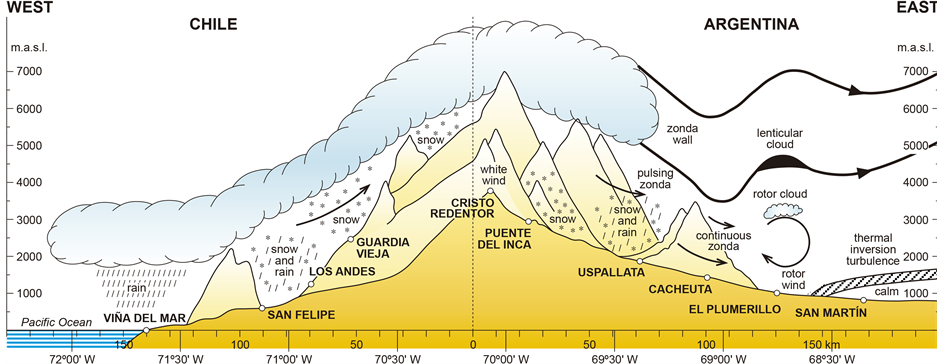
Diagram showing the Foehn effect creating the Zonda.

The Zonda is a dry wind (often carrying dust) which comes from the polar maritime air, warmed by descent from the crest, which is approximately 6,000 m (20,000 ft) above sea level. It may exceed a velocity of 240 km/h (150 mph).

The Zonda wind is produced by the northeastward movement of polar fronts, and although it is hot and dry at the low-lands, it is the main mechanism for snow precipitation at the high altitude chains, where it looks as viento blanco, reaching speeds sometimes over 200 km/h. Thus, instead of being a snow-eater, this wind is particularly important for this arid region, as it is connected to the buildup of the winter snow cover and accumulation over the scarce local glaciers.

== Occurrence ==
While this type of föhn wind may occur over most central parts of western Argentina, its effects are more impressive in La Rioja, San Juan, and northern Mendoza provinces, where the mountain barrier (the Andes) is higher, while to the north the Puna plateau dissipates these winds.

According to studies (conducted over the period 1967–1976), the Zonda wind most commonly starts during the afternoon (between 12 and 6 p.m.), and tends to last between 1 and 12 hours, though it may present itself intermittently for as long as 2 or 3 days. It is countered usually by the entrance of cold air masses moving northwestward (viento sur). In 90% of the cases, the phenomenon takes place between May and November.

== Alternative usage ==
The term zonda also describes a hot, humid north wind in the Pampas, in advance of a depression moving eastwards, and preceding the pampero. This wind is also called the sondo.

== See also ==
- Zonda Department, a department of the province of San Juan, Argentina.
- Pagani Zonda, a sports car which takes its name from the wind.
- Puelche wind
- Southeast Australian foehn
