= Puelche (wind) =

A Puelche wind (in Spanish, viento puelche) is a dry foehn-like eastern wind that occurs in south-central Chile. The wind owns its name from the Puelche people who inhabited the eastern slopes of the Andes. Puelche winds are mainly caused by South Pacific high pressure extending eastwards across the Andes and/or building a ridge to an area of high pressure centered over the South Atlantic. Puelche winds appearing in spring can cause fast snow melt in the Andes, producing floods and reducing the albedo of glaciers.
