= Föhn cloud =

Cloud type

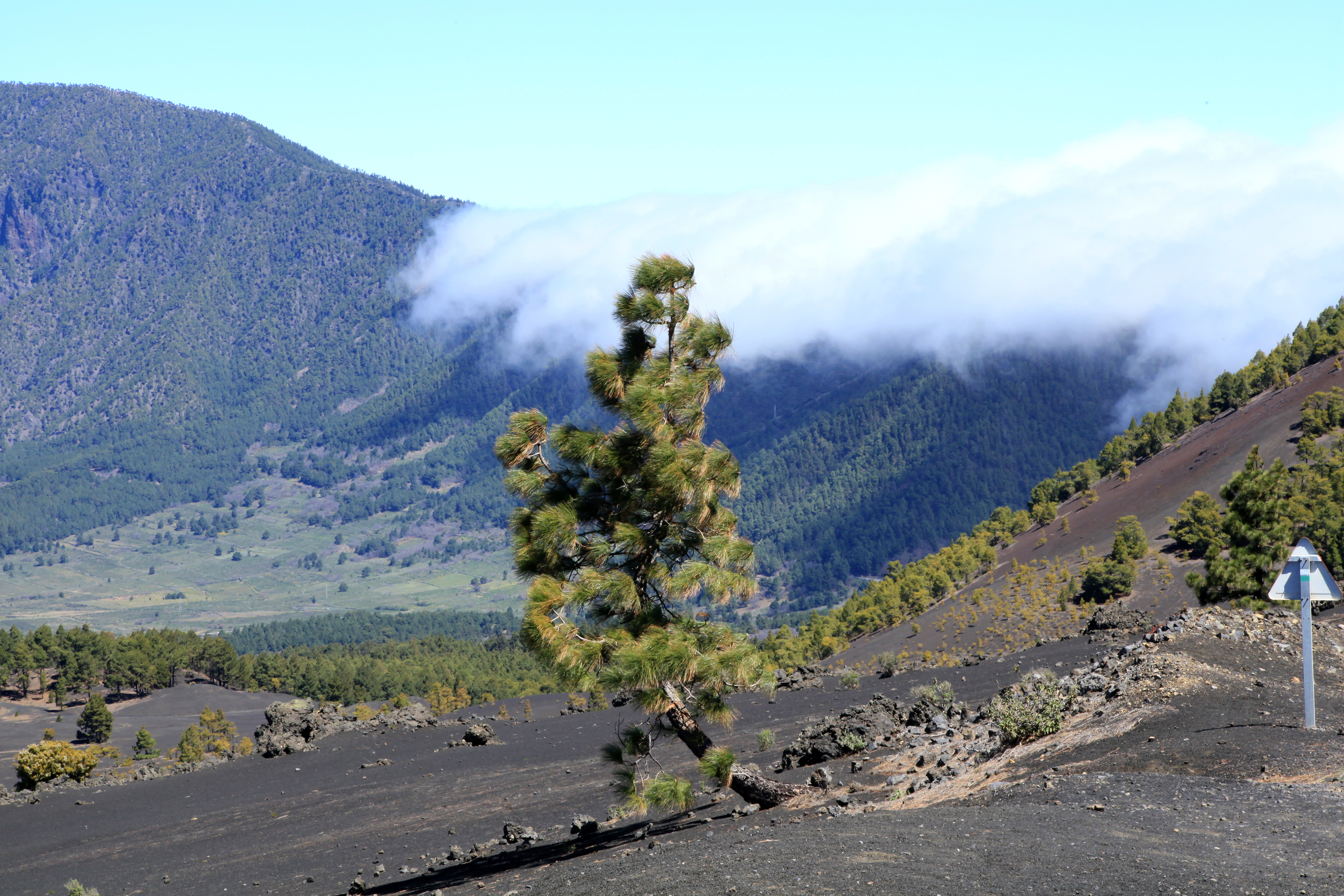
Orographic fohn cloud over La Palma, Canary Islands

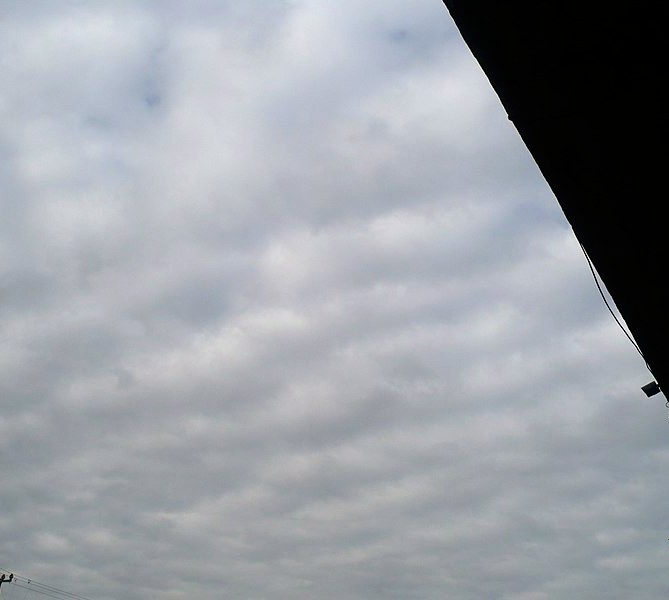
Wave clouds

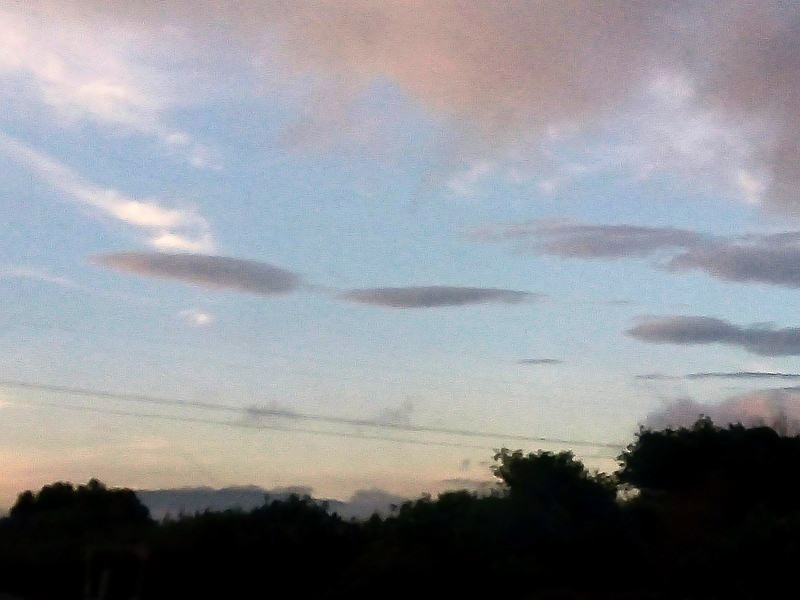
Lenticular clouds with rotor clouds underneath

A Föhn cloud or Foehn cloud is any cloud associated with a Föhn (Foehn), usually an orographic cloud, a mountain wave cloud, or a lenticular cloud.

Föhn is a regional term referring to winds in the Alps.

== See also ==
- Cloud types
- Föhn wind
- Nor'west arch
- Pileus
