= Climate of Pakistan =

Pakistan map of Köppen climate classification (note that the humid subtropical climate - in green, has expanded southward, and that a semi arid climate has emerged in the southeast (Sindh)).

Pakistan's climate varies from a continental type of climate in the north (Gilgit-Baltistan, Kashmir, KPK), a mountainous dry climate in the west (Baluchistan), a wet climate in the East (Punjab) an arid climate in the Thar Desert, to a tropical climate in the southeast (Sindh), characterized by extreme variations in temperature, both seasonally and daily, because it is located on a great landmass barely north of the Tropic of Cancer (between latitudes 25° and 37° N).

Very high altitudes modify the climate in the cold, snow-covered northern mountains; temperatures on the Balochistan plateau are somewhat higher. Along the coastal strip, the climate is modified by sea breezes. In the rest of the country, temperatures reach great heights in the summer; the mean temperature during June is 38 °C (100 °F) in the plains,and the highest temperatures can exceed 53 °C (127 °F). During summer, hot winds called Loo blow across the plains during the day. Trees shed their leaves to avoid loss of moisture. Pakistan recorded one of the highest temperatures in the world, 53.7 °C (128.66 °F) on 28 May 2017, the hottest temperature ever recorded in Pakistan and also the second hottest measured temperature ever recorded in Asia.

The dry, hot weather is occasionally broken by dust storms and thunderstorms that temporarily lower the temperature. Evenings are cool; the daily variation in temperature may be as much as 11 °C to 17 °C. Winters are cold, with minimum mean temperatures in Punjab of about 4 °C (39 °F) in January, and sub-zero temperatures in the far north and Balochistan.

== Climate geography ==
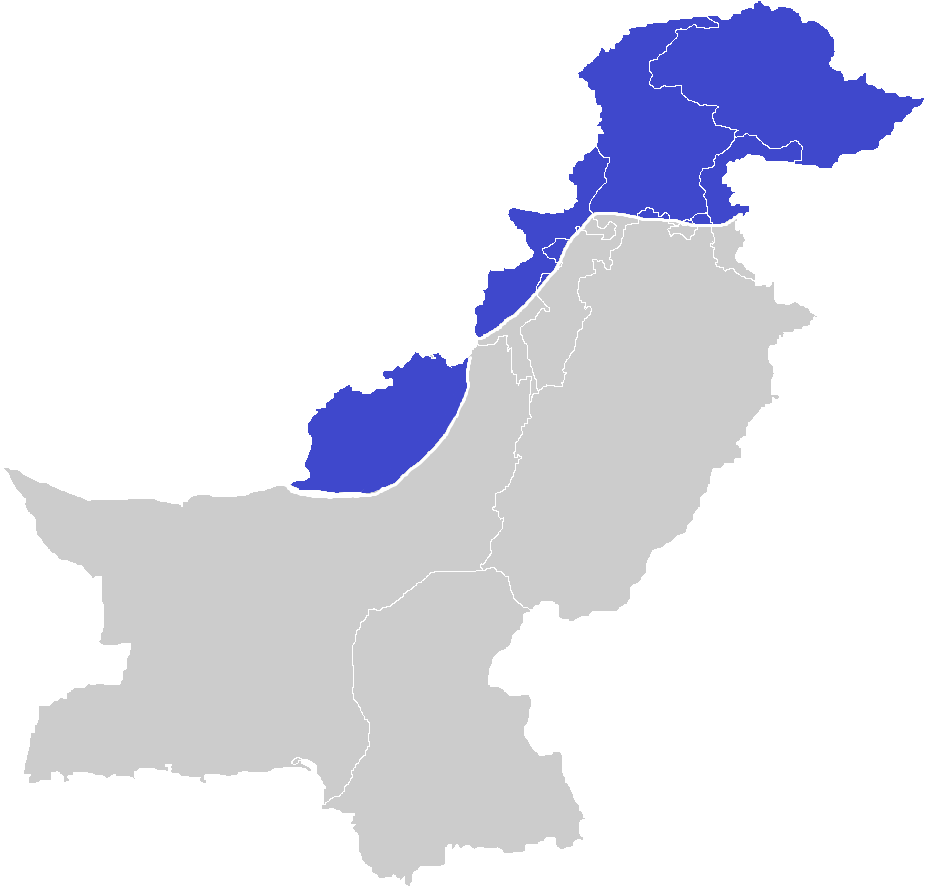
Estimation of regions where snow regularly falls

The monsoon and the Western Disturbance are the two main factors that alter the weather over Pakistan; Continental air prevails for the rest of the year. The following are the main factors that influence the weather over Pakistan.

- Western Disturbances mostly occur during the winter months and cause light to moderate showers in southern parts of the country, while moderate to heavy showers and heavy snowfall in the northern parts of the country. These westerly waves are robbed of most of the moisture by the time they reach Pakistan.
- Fog occurs during the winter season and can remain for weeks in upper Sindh, central Khyber Pakhtunkhwa, and Punjab.
- Southwest Monsoon occurs in summer from the month of June to September in almost whole of Pakistan excluding western Balochistan, FATA, Chitral and Gilgit–Baltistan. Monsoon rains bring much-awaited relief from the scorching summer heat. These monsoon rains are quite heavy by nature and can cause significant flooding, even severe flooding if they interact with westerly waves in the upper parts of the country.
- Tropical storms usually form during the summer months from late April to June and then from late September to November. They affect the coastal localities of the country.
- Dust storms occur during summer months with peaking in May and June. They are locally known as Andhi. These dust storms are quite violent. Dust storms during the early summer indicate the arrival of the monsoons, while dust storms in the autumn indicate the arrival of winter.
- Heat waves occur during May and June, especially in southern Punjab, central Balochistan and upper Sindh.
- Thunderstorms most commonly occur in northern Punjab, Khyber Pakhtunkhwa and Azaad Kashmir.
- Continental air prevails during the period when there is no precipitation in the country.

Pakistan has four seasons: a cool and cold winter from December through February; a pleasant spring from March through May; the summer rainy season, or southwest monsoon period, from June through September; and dry autumn period in October and November. The onset and duration of these seasons vary greatly according to location.

The climate in the capital city of Islamabad varies from an average daily low of 2 °C in January to an average daily high of 38 °C in June. Half of the annual rainfall occurs in July and August, averaging about 255 millimeters in each of those two months. The remainder of the year has significantly less rain, amounting to about fifty millimeters per month. Hailstorms are common in the spring.

Pakistan's largest city, Karachi, which is also the country's industrial center, is more humid than Islamabad but receives less rain, but still possessing a tropical climate. Only July, August, and September average more than 75 millimeters of rain in the Karachi area; the remaining months are rather dry. The temperature is also more uniform in Karachi than in Islamabad due to its tropical climate, ranging from an average daily low of 13 °C during winter evenings to an average daily high of 34 °C on summer days. Although the summer temperatures do not reach as high as those in Punjab, the high humidity causes the residents a great deal of discomfort. In Islamabad, there are cold winds from the north of Pakistan.

A high of 53.7 °C (128.66 °F) was recorded in Turbat, Balochistan, on 28 May 2017. It was not only the hottest temperature ever recorded in Pakistan but also the second verified hottest temperature ever recorded in Asia as of 2019 and the fourth highest temperature ever recorded on earth. The highest rainfall of 620 millimetres (24 in) was recorded in Islamabad during 24 hours on 24 July 2001. The record-breaking rain fell in just 10 hours. It was the heaviest rainfall in Islamabad in the previous 100 years.

=== Tropical cyclones and tornadoes ===
Each year, before the onset of monsoon, that is 15 April to 15 July, and also after its withdrawal, that is 15 September to 15 December, there is always a distinct possibility of the cyclonic storm to developing in the north Arabian Sea. Cyclones form in the Arabian sea often result in strong winds and heavy rainfall in Pakistan's coastal areas. However tornadoes mostly occur during the spring season that is March and April usually when a Western Disturbance starts affecting the northern parts of the country. It is also speculated that cycles of tornado years may be correlated with the periods of reduced tropical cyclone activity. They have also reported two tornadoes over Peshawar (Pakistan), one near Ludhiana (Punjab) on 10 March 1975, and one over Delhi on 17 March 1978. A tornado is also reported to have hit Chak Misran village close to Sargodha in Pakistan on 28 March, 2001 (Khan, 2010; Faisal and Jameel, 2010).

=== Drought ===
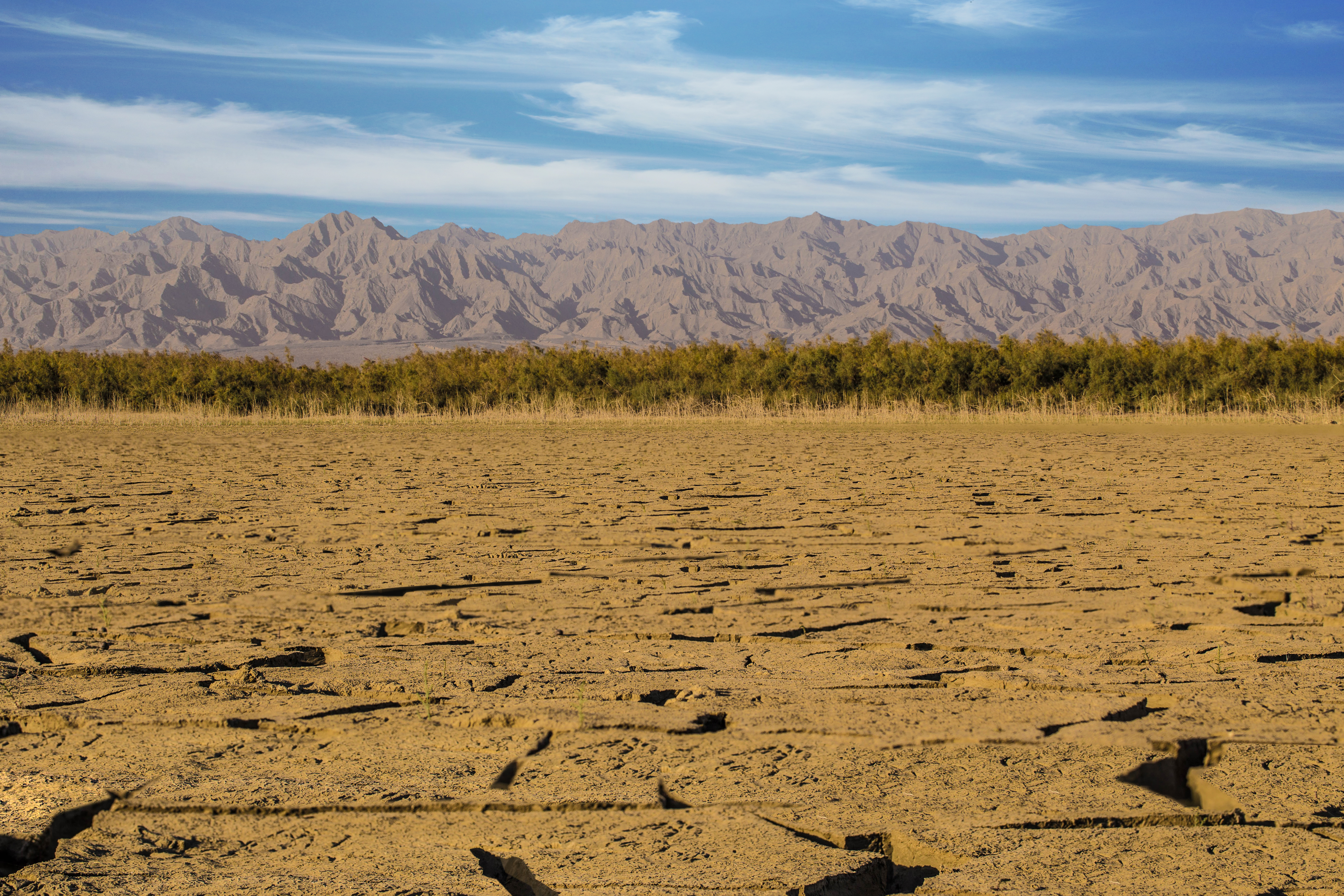
Drought in Balochistan, Pakistan

Pakistan is the fifteenth most water stressed country in the world.

The drought has become a frequent phenomenon in the country. Already, the massive droughts of 1998-2002 have stretched the coping abilities of the existing systems to the limit, and it has barely been able to prevent the situation from becoming a catastrophe. The drought of 1998-2002 is considered the worst drought in 50 years. According to the Economic Survey of Pakistan, the drought was one of the most significant factors responsible for the less-than-anticipated growth performance. The survey terms it the worst drought in the history of the country. According to the government, 40 percent of the country's water needs went unmet.

=== Floods ===
Pakistan has seen many floods, the worst and most destructive is the recent 2010 Pakistan floods. Other floods that caused destruction in the history of Pakistan include the flood of 1950, which killed 2,910 people; on 1 July 1977, heavy rains and flooding in Karachi, killed 248 people. According to Pakistan Meteorological Department, 207 millimetres (8.1 in) of rain fell in 24 hours. In 1992 flooding, during Monsoon season killed 1,834 people across the country. In 1993 flooding during Monsoon rains killed 3,083 people over South Asia, 15 of whom were in Pakistan. In 2003, Sindh province was badly affected due to monsoon rains, causing damages in billions, killed 178 people, while in 2007, Cyclone Yemyin submerged lower part of Balochistan Province in seawater, killing 380 people. Before that, it killed 213 people in Karachi on its way to Balochistan.

==== 2010 Floods ====
The July 2010 floods swept across 20% of Pakistan's land. The flood were result of unprecedented monsoon rains that lasted from 28  to july 31, 2010. Khyber Pakhtunkhwa and North eastern Punjab were badly affected during the monsoon rains when dams, rivers and lakes overflowed. By mid-August, according to the governmental Federal Flood Commission (FFC), the floods had caused the deaths of at least 1,540 people, while 2,088 people had been injured, 557,226 houses had been destroyed, and over 6 million people had been displaced.[8] One month later, the data was updated to reveal 1,781 deaths, 2,966 people with injuries, and more than 1.89 million homes destroyed.[9] The floods affected more than 20 million people exceeding the combined total of individuals affected by the 2004 Indian Ocean tsunami, the 2005 Kashmir earthquake and the 2010 Haiti earthquake.[10][11] The flood is considered the worst in Pakistan's history affecting people of all four provinces and Gilgit–Baltistan and Azad Kashmir region of Pakistan.[12]

==== 2011 Sindh floods ====
The 2011 Sindh floods began during the monsoon season in mid-August 2011, resulting from heavy monsoon rains in Sindh, Eastern Balochistan, and Southern Punjab. The floods caused considerable damage; an estimated 270 civilians were killed, with 5.3 million people and 1.2 million homes affected. Sindh is a fertile region and often called the "breadbasket" of the country; the damage and toll of the floods on the local agrarian economy are said to be extensive. At least 1.7 million acres of arable land have been inundated as a result of the flooding. The flooding has been described as the worst since the 2010 Pakistan floods, which devastated the entire country. Unprecedented torrential monsoon rains caused severe flooding in 16 districts of Sindh province.

==== 2022 floods ====
In 2022, floods caused by monsoon rains and melting glaciers in Pakistan, particularly in the southern regions of Sindh and Balochistan had killed at least 1,128 people, including 340 children and six military officers in a helicopter crash, with over 1,700 more injured. It was the world's deadliest flood since 2017. On 25 August, Pakistan declared a state of emergency because of the flooding.

==== 2023 floods ====
From March to July 2023, floods caused by monsoon rains returned to Pakistan after nine months. They worsened at the end of June due to the upcoming monsoon rains. At least 159 people were killed, including many children.

=== Extreme temperatures ===
Climate data for Pakistan
Month	Jan	Feb	Mar	Apr	May	Jun	Jul	Aug	Sep	Oct	Nov	Dec	Year
Record high °C (°F)	33.3 (91.9)	38.2 (100.8)	45.5 (113.9)	51.0 (123.8)	53.5 (128.3)	52.0 (125.6)	53.0 (127.4)	48.5 (119.3)	46.1 (115.0)	43.3 (109.9)	41.1 (106.0)	36.0 (96.8)	53.5 (128.3)
Record low °C (°F)	−2.3 (27.9)	2.8 (37.0)	15.5 (59.9)	15.5 (59.9)	19.3 (66.7)	23.0 (73.4)	19.7 (67.5)	20.3 (68.5)	20.0 (68.0)	17.0 (62.6)	9.0 (48.2)	−5.6 (22.0)	−5.6 (22.0)

== Climate change ==
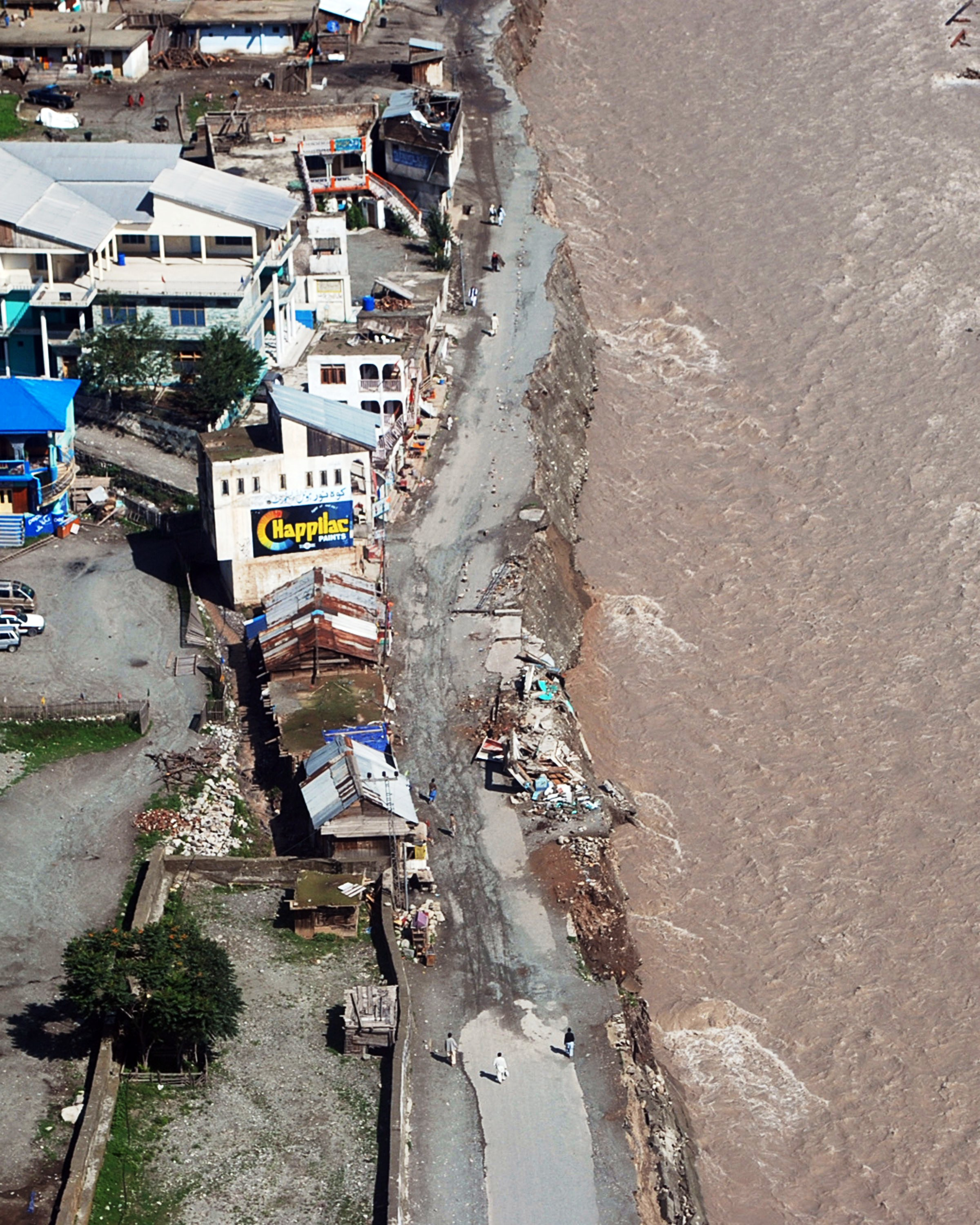
Climate change may have been a contributing factor to the severity of the 2010 Pakistan floods.

Pakistan is highly vulnerable to climate change. As with the changing climate in South Asia as a whole, the climate of Pakistan has changed over the past several decades, with significant impacts on the environment and people. In addition to increased heat, drought and extreme weather in parts of the country, the melting of glaciers in the Himalayas has impacted some of the important rivers of Pakistan. Between 1999 and 2018, Pakistan ranked 5th in the countries affected by extreme weather events caused by climate change.

As Pakistan's largest province, Punjab has demonstrated its commitment to addressing climate change challenges through initiatives such as the Climate Change Activity Plan and the Punjab Climate Change Strategy.

Pakistan is prone to a range of natural disasters, including cyclones, floods, drought, intense rainfall, and earthquakes. According to scientific research, climate change played a substantial role in the devastating 2022 floods, which directly affected over 30 million people in Pakistan, causing loss of life, damage to public infrastructure, and widespread displacement. Climate change poses a significant menace to Pakistan's economy and security.

== See also ==
- Climate of Islamabad
- Climate of Karachi
- Climate of Lahore
- Climate of Faisalabad
- Climate of Rawalpindi
- Climate of Peshawar
- Climate of Quetta
- Climate of Multan
- Climate of Hyderabad, Sindh
- Climate of Sindh
- Climate of Nawabshah
- Climate of Gwadar
- Third Pole
