= Climate of Hyderabad, Sindh =

Coordinates: 25°22′45″N 68°22′06″E

The climate of Hyderabad is Subtropical semi-arid, featuring too little rain and too cool to feature the tropical savanna climate. The days are hot and dry, usually going up to extreme highs of 40 °C (104 °F), while the nights are cool and breezy. Winds usually bring along clouds of dust, and people prefer staying indoors in the daytime, while the breezes at night are pleasant and clean.

In recent years Hyderabad has seen heavy downpours. In February 2003, Hyderabad received 105 millimetres (4.1 in) of rain in 12 hours, due to a sudden climate change. The years 2006, 2007 and 2009 saw close competition to this record rainfall.

== Weather ==
Climate data for Hyderabad, Sindh, Pakistan
Month	Jan	Feb	Mar	Apr	May	Jun	Jul	Aug	Sep	Oct	Nov	Dec	Year
Record high °C (°F)	33.3 (91.9)	38.2 (100.8)	43.4 (110.1)	46.0 (114.8)	49.5 (121.1)	48.5 (119.3)	45.5 (113.9)	43.9 (111.0)	45.0 (113.0)	44.0 (111.2)	41.0 (105.8)	36.0 (96.8)	49.5 (121.1)
Mean daily maximum °C (°F)	23.6 (74.5)	27.5 (81.5)	33.5 (92.3)	38.9 (102.0)	41.6 (106.9)	40.2 (104.4)	37.4 (99.3)	36.3 (97.3)	36.8 (98.2)	37.2 (99.0)	31.9 (89.4)	25.0 (77.0)	34.2 (93.5)
Mean daily minimum °C (°F)	11.1 (52.0)	13.6 (56.5)	18.5 (65.3)	23.0 (73.4)	26.2 (79.2)	28.1 (82.6)	27.8 (82.0)	26.7 (80.1)	25.3 (77.5)	22.3 (72.1)	17.3 (63.1)	12.5 (54.5)	21.0 (69.9)
Record low °C (°F)	−1.0 (30.2)	1.0 (33.8)	6.0 (42.8)	12.0 (53.6)	19.0 (66.2)	20.0 (68.0)	21.4 (70.5)	22.8 (73.0)	20.6 (69.1)	15.0 (59.0)	6.0 (42.8)	3.3 (37.9)	3.0 (37.4)
Average rainfall mm (inches)	1.2 (0.05)	3.9 (0.15)	15.1 (0.59)	25.8 (1.02)	13.5 (0.53)	73.9 (2.91)	76.7 (3.02)	52.8 (2.08)	41.4 (1.63)	1.5 (0.06)	2.1 (0.08)	12.0 (0.47)	319.9 (12.59)
Mean monthly sunshine hours	272.8	257.1	288.3	288.0	313.1	279.0	235.6	251.1	285.0	306.9	279.0	272.8	3,328.7
Source 1:
Source 2: HKO (sun only, 1969–1989)

== Factors ==
The monsoon and the Western Disturbance are the two main factors that change the weather over Hyderabad; otherwise, Continental air prevails for rest of the seasons. Following are the main factors that influence the weather over Hyderabad city.

- Western Disturbances generally occur during the winter months and cause drizzle to light showers, temperatures also decrease due to it.
- Dust storms occur rarely during the month of May and June.
- Southwest Monsoon occurs in summer from the month of June till September. Monsoon rains bring much awaited relief from the scorching heat. These monsoon rains are quite heavy by nature and can cause significant flooding.
- Continental air prevails during the period when there is no precipitation in the city.

== Seasonal climate ==
Like other cities, Hyderabad has four seasons: winter, summer, autumn and spring. The monsoon season occurs in the Summer.

=== Winter ===
The winter season begins in the month of December and lasts till February. The Western Disturbance influences the winter season. The lowest temperature in winter was below 0.0 °C (32.0 °F) in january 2006 and 1.0 °C (33.8 °F) on February 8 2012. The highest temperature in winter was 38.2 °C (100.8 °F), recorded on February 16, 1993. Light to moderate showers occur in winter, which decreases the temperature further due to the Western Disturbance. After rainfall strong winds from northwest blow all over hyderabad causing cold day conditions and freezing windchill. The highest monthly rainfall in winter 106 millimetres (4.2 in) was recorded in February 2003. The fastest rainfall in 24 hours was also recorded on 18 February 2003: 105 millimetres (4.1 in) was recorded in less than 12 hours.

=== Spring ===
The spring season begins in March and lasts till April. Being a dry city, Hyderabad's spring season is almost not felt. The highest temperature of spring was 46 °C (115 °F), recorded on April 2, 2002, while the lowest 6 °C (43 °F) was recorded on March 4, 2024. Rains are rare in the spring season. The highest monthly rainfall 47.2 millimetres (1.86 in) was recorded in the month of March. The fastest rainfall in 24 hours 46.7 millimetres (1.84 in) was recorded on 2 April 1963.

=== Summer ===
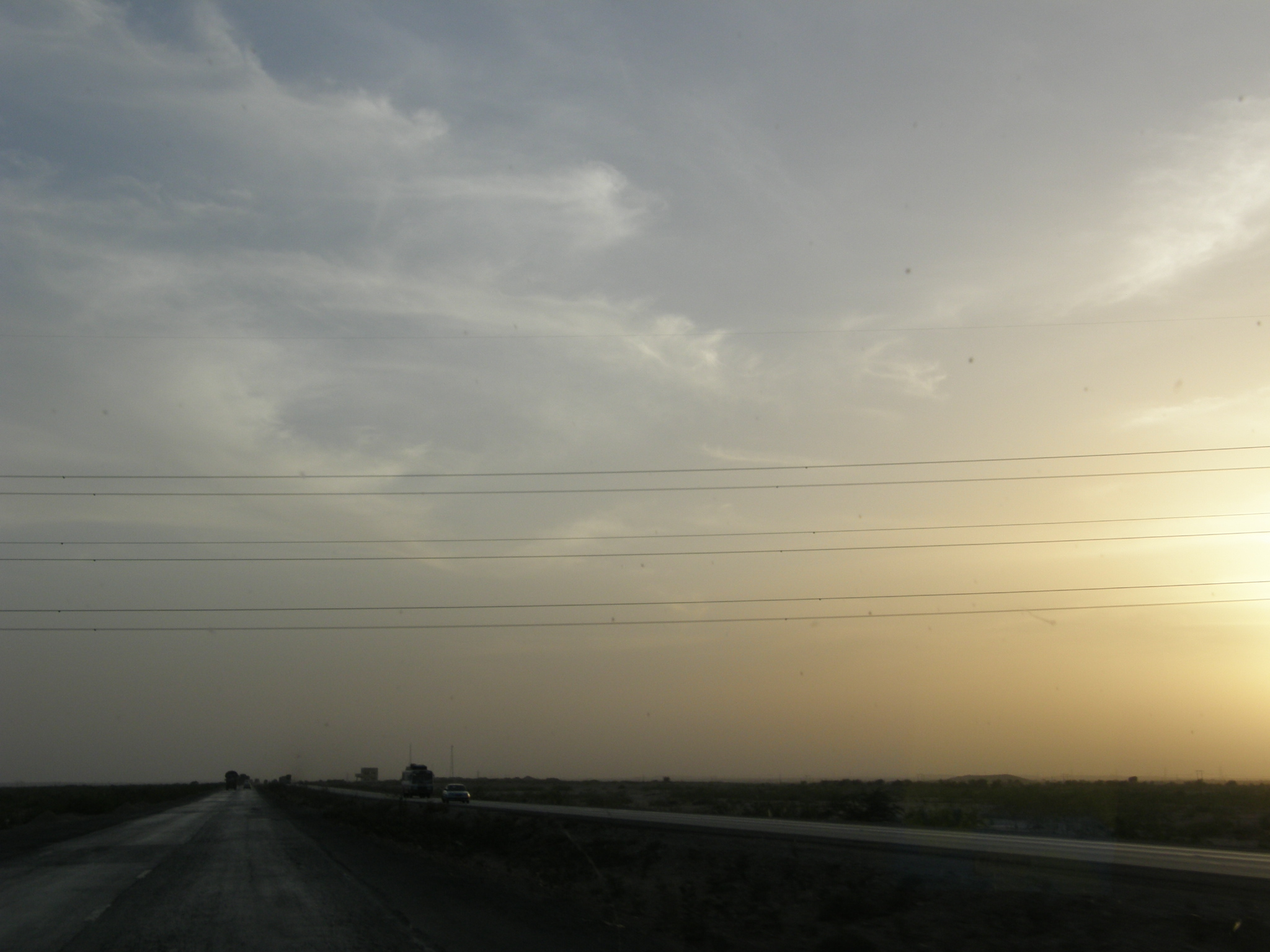
Cirrus cloud indicating monsoon presence.

The summer season begins in May and lasts till September. Summer is the longest season in Hyderabad. Monsoon rains also occur in this season; these rains last from June till September. Extremely high temperatures are recorded in the summer. Heavy rains also occur during the monsoon season. The highest temperature recorded in summer was 49.5 °C (121.1 °F), recorded on 19 June 2016, while the lowest 19 °C (66 °F) was recorded on May 4, 1989. The heaviest rainfall for Hyderabad also occurred in summer on September 12, 1962, when 250.7 mm of rain fell in 24 hours. The wettest month in Hyderabad is July. The highest monthly rainfall in summer 286 millimetres (11.3 in) was recorded in September 1962. In June 2010, Cyclone Phet's moisture caused heavy downpours in the city; a total of 76 millimetres (3.0 in) rainfall was recorded with 32 mph winds.

=== Autumn ===
This season begins in October and ends in November. Hazy and dry weather is the main factor of autumn. The highest temperature 44.4 °C (111.9 °F) was recorded on May 23, 2020, and the lowest temperature was 6.7 °C (44.1 °F), recorded on 28 November 1966. Showers do occur in this season late in November from the Western Disturbances. The highest monthly rainfall in autumn was 103.3 mm in October 2004, while the fastest 24-hour rainfall in autumn 85.6 millimetres (3.37 in) was recorded on 3 October 2004. In October 2004, Cyclone Onil created havoc in the city, with 98 millimetres (3.9 in) rainfall, and caused the drainage system to collapse.

== Monsoon rainfall in Hyderabad ==
The average annual rainfall (January to December) for Hyderabad is 336.1 millimetres (13.23 in). The highest annual rainfall was 795 millimetres (31.3 in), recorded in 2006. The average monsoon rainfall for Hyderabad is 205 millimetres (8.1 in). Following is the annual monsoon rainfall (June till September) since 2008. The following is the annual monsoon rainfall for the last few years based on data from the Pakistan Meteorological Department.

- In 2003, a total of 286 millimetres (11.3 in) rainfall was recorded.
- In 2005, a total of 129 millimetres (5.1 in) rainfall was recorded.
- In 2006, a total of 455 millimetres (17.9 in) rainfall was recorded.
- In 2008, a total of 315 millimetres (12.4 in) rainfall was recorded.
- In 2009, a total of 279 millimetres (11.0 in) rainfall was recorded.
- In 2010, a total of 313 millimetres (12.3 in) rainfall was recorded.
- In 2011, a total of 415.4 millimetres (16.35 in) rainfall was recorded.

== See also ==
- Climate of Sindh
- Climate of Karachi
- Climate of Pakistan
