= Fauna of Sindh =

Native animals of Sindh

The district of Sindh

The fauna of Sindh live in an area with a semi arid climate. With its coastal and riverine forests, its huge fresh water lakes, mountains and deserts, Sindh supports a large and varied wildlife population.

== Habitat and wildlife ==
Due to the climate of Sindh, its forests support average population of jackals and snakes. As of 2015, the Indian flapshell turtle was common in Sindh. The national parks established by the Government of Pakistan, in collaboration with organizations such as World Wide Fund for Nature and the Sindh Wildlife Department helps preserve a huge variety of animals and birds. The Kirthar National Park in the Kirthar range spreads out over more than 3000 km^{2} of desert, stunted tree forests and a lake. The KNP supports Sindh ibex, wild sheep (urial) and the black bear along with the rare leopard. There are also occasional sightings of The Sindhi phekari, ped lynx or caracal cat.

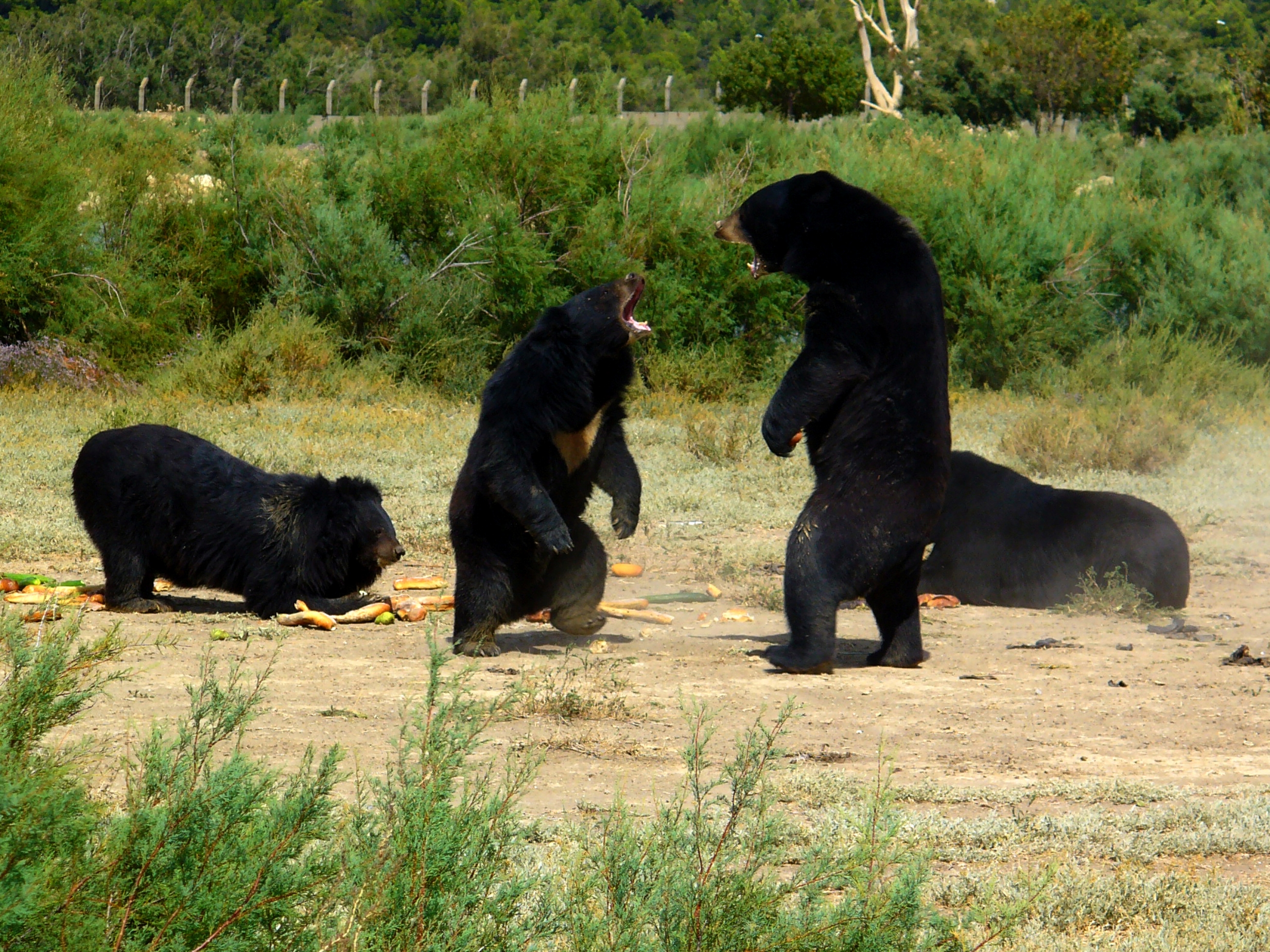
Black bears

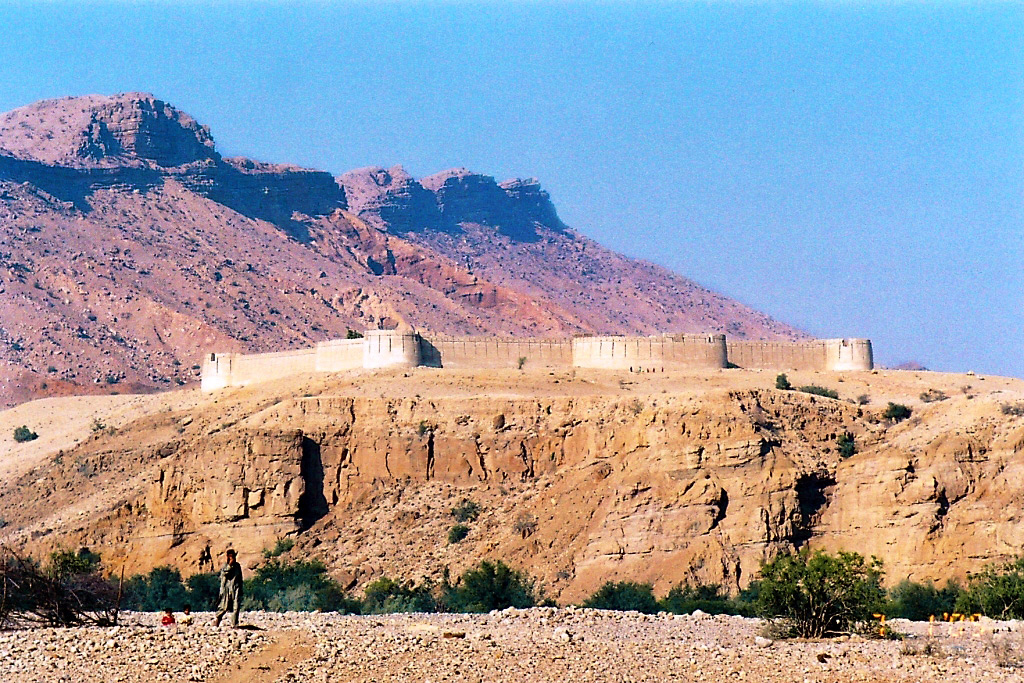
Rani Kot, a fort in the Kirthar range.

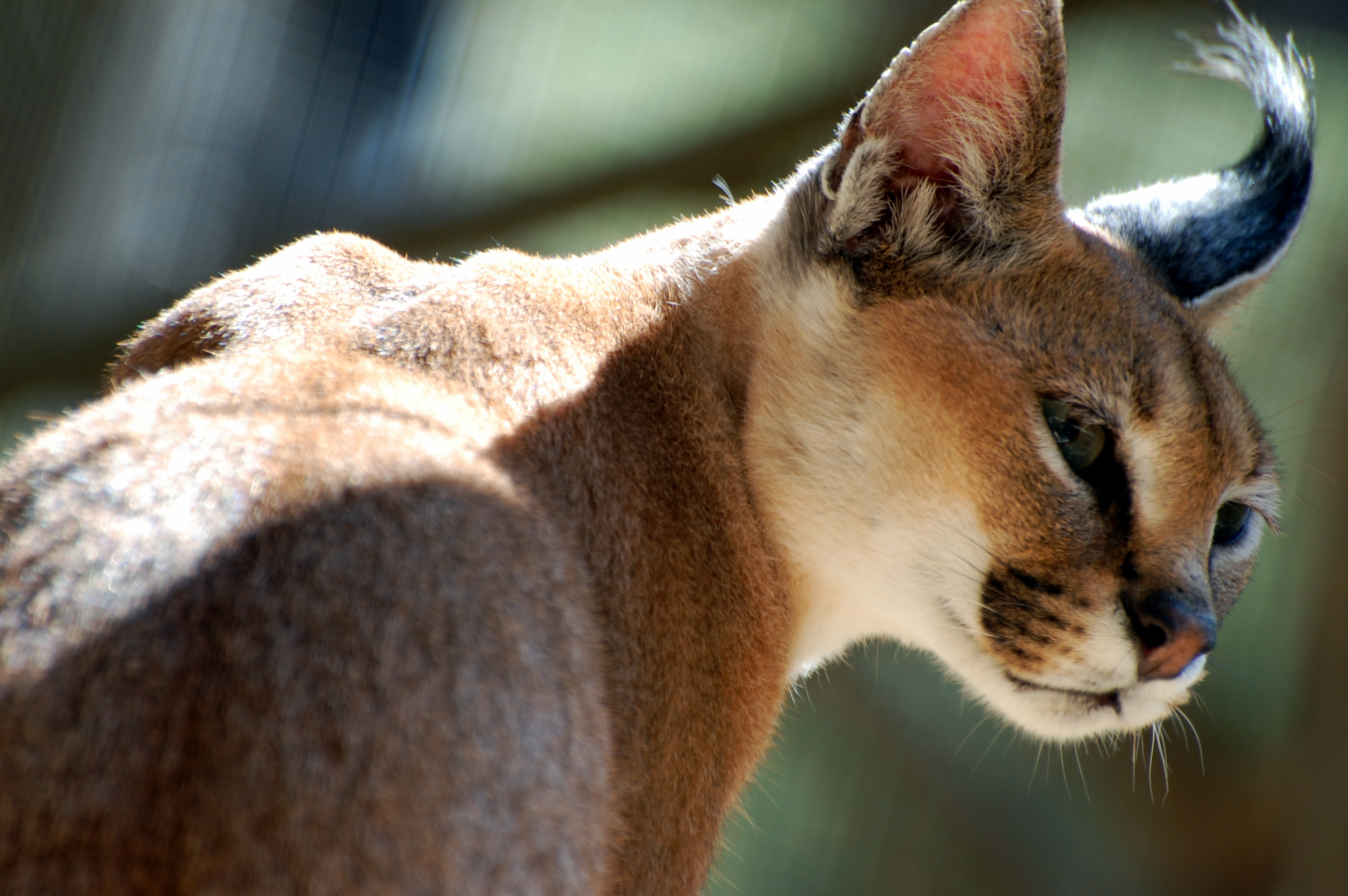
Caracal

== Nara Canal region ==
Another biodiversity rich area of Sindh is the huge plains around the Nara Canal. The Nara Canal juts out of the Indus River from the Sukkur Barrage and irrigates hundreds of thousands of acres of cultivated land. The Nara Canal also provides vital water for species living in its proximity. Species the area supports include Jerdon's babbler. The famous Indus river dolphin is among the most endangered species in Pakistan and is found in the Northern Sindh's Indus River area and the upper reaches of the Nara Canal. Pharo (hog deer) and wild bear are found in the area of the central inundation belt. There are a variety of bats, lizards and reptiles: including the cobra, lundi (viper), Brilliant ground agama

== Animals of mythical proportions ==
Some unusual sightings of Asian cheetah occurred in 2003 near the Balochistan border in the Kirthar mountains. The pirrang (large tiger cat or fishing cat) of the eastern desert region is also disappearing. Deer are found in the lower rocky plains and in the eastern region, as well as the striped hyena (charakh), jackal, red fox, porcupine, common gray mongoose and hedgehog. The mysterious Sindh krait of the Thar region, which is supposed to suck a victim's breath while sleeping, is widely found in the Tharparkar District of Southern Sindh.

== Along the coast ==
Between July and November when the monsoon winds blow onshore from the ocean, giant olive ridley turtles lay their eggs along the seaward side. These turtles are a protected species. After the mothers lay their eggs and leave them buried under the sands. Today the SWD and WWF officials take the eggs, protecting them until they are hatched away from predators.

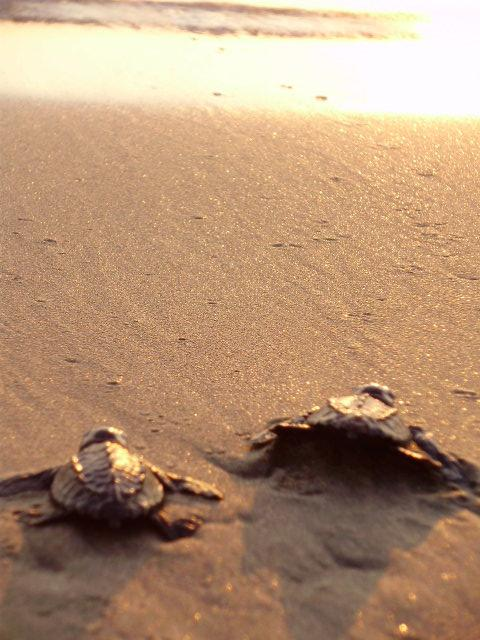
Newly hatched olive ridley turtles head for the ocean

Crocodiles are rare and inhabit only the backwaters of the Indus, the eastern Nara channel. Some population of marsh crocodiles can be very easily seen in the waters of Haleji Lake near Karachi. Besides a large variety of marine fish, the plumbeous dolphin, the beaked dolphin, rorqual or blue whale and a variety of skates frequent the seas along the Sindh's coast. The pallo (sable fish), though a marine fish, ascends the Indus annually from February to April to spawn. The rare houbara bustard also finds Sindh's warm climate suitable to rest and mate.

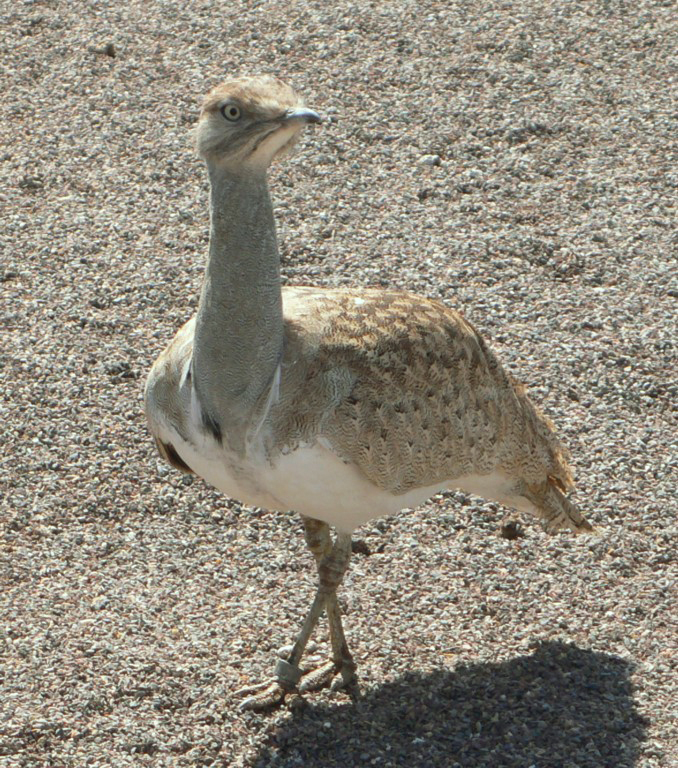
The rare houbara bustard

== See also ==
- Fauna of Pakistan
- Flora of Sindh
- Flora of Pakistan
- Climate of Sindh
