= Geography of Karachi =

Encyclopedic information about Karachi's geography

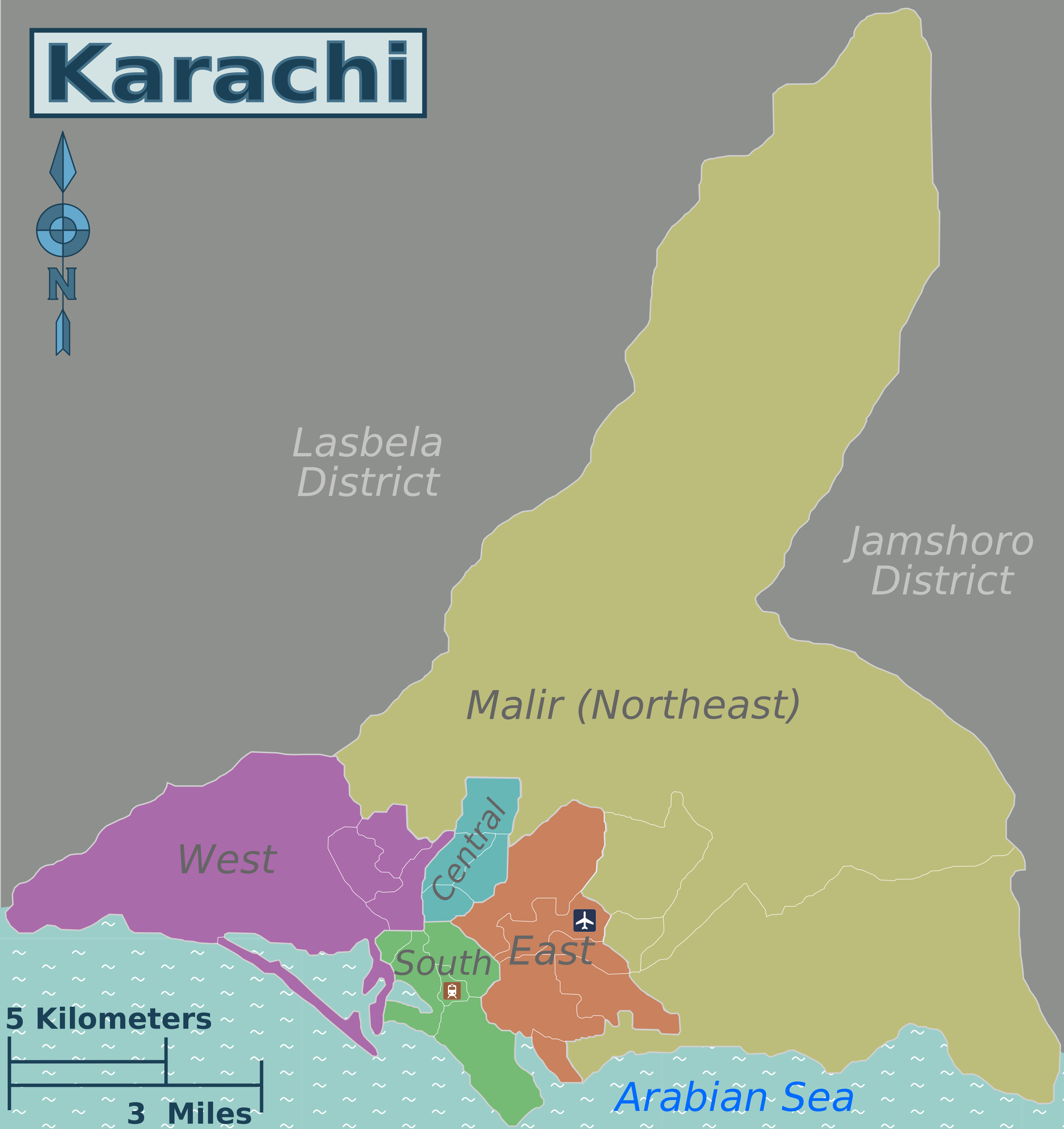
Map of Karachi

Karachi is Pakistan's largest city and is the capital of Sindh; it lies on Pakistan's southern coast, on the Arabian Sea just northwest of the Indus River Delta . Originally a tiny fishing village, Karachi became a trading center in the 18th century. The British, after gaining control of the region in the 19th century, developed the city into an important port. Rapid growth came after Pakistan became independent in 1947, largely, because of the city having been historically the largest urban centre during British rule in regions forming modern Pakistan. Karachi was the national capital from 1947 until 1959. Over the next several decades it became one of the fastest-growing cities in the world, doubling its population from 1981 to 1999.

The hills in Karachi are the off-shoots of the Kirthar Range. The highest point of these hills in Karachi is about 528m in the extreme north. All these hills are devoid of vegetation and have wide intervening plains, dry river beds and water channels.

Karachi is located on the coastline of Sindh province in southern Pakistan, along a natural harbour on the Arabian Sea. Karachi is built on coastal plains with scattered rocky outcroppings, hills and coastal marshlands. Coastal mangrove forests grow in the brackish waters around the Karachi Harbour, and further southeast towards the expansive Indus River Delta. West of Karachi city is the Cape Monze, locally known as Ras Muari, which is an area characterized by sea cliffs, rocky sandstone promontories and undeveloped beaches. As Karachi is situated on the Arabian Sea, so it serves as a transport hub and is home to two of Pakistan's largest seaports, namely, the Port of Karachi and Port Bin Qasim.

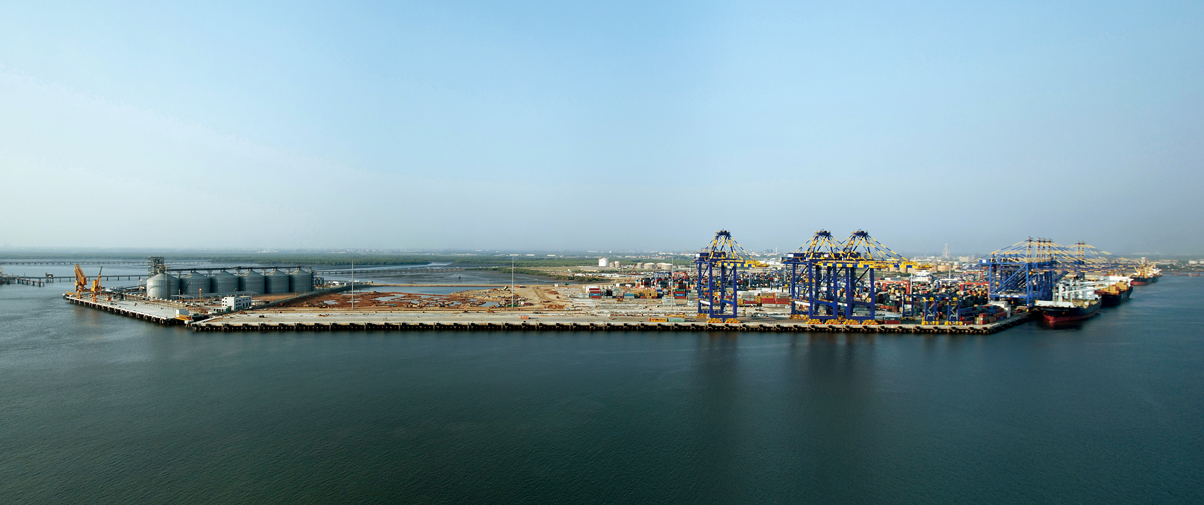
Port Qasim

== See also ==
- Climate of Karachi
