= Climate of Multan =

Coordinates: 30°12′0″N 71°25′0″E

Multan

Climate chart (precipitation, max. and min. temperature)
J	F	M	A	M	J	J	A	S	O	N	D
18 21 5	16 24 8	19 29 14	14 36 20	12 41 25	43 42 29	76 39 29	70 38 28	45 37 25	16 34 19	1.4 29 12	5.9 23 7
- █ Average max. and min. temperatures in °C
- █ Precipitation totals in mm
- Source: World Meteorological Organization
Imperial conversion
J	F	M	A	M	J	J	A	S	O	N	D
0.7 69 42	0.6 74 47	0.7 84 57	0.6 97 68	0.5 106 78	1.7 108 84	3 102 84	2.7 100 82	1.8 98 77	0.6 93 65	0.1 83 53	0.2 73 44
- █ Average max. and min. temperatures in °F
- █ Precipitation totals in inches

Multan is a city located in the southern part of Punjab, province in Pakistan. Multan features a hot semi arid climate with very hot and rainy summers and cold winters. The city witnesses some of the most extreme temperatures in the country. Dust storms are a common occurrence within the city. The closest major city is Bahawalpur. The area around the city is a flat plain and is ideal for agriculture, with many citrus and mango farms. There are many canals that cut across the Multan District, providing water from nearby farms. This makes the land very fertile. However usually land close to the Chenab River are flooded in the monsoon season.

== Factors ==
The monsoon and the Western Disturbance are the two main factors that affect the weather in Multan; otherwise, Continental air prevails for rest of the seasons. Following are the main factors that influence the weather over Multan.

- Western Disturbances generally occur during the winter months and cause moderate rainfall. Hailstorms are also a common occurrence in the city.
- Smog Does occur in December and January when Fog Concentration is High in The City Of Saints. The fog and smoke combine strongly in these months to form Smog. During intense bouts of smog the local government often prohibits inhabitants of the city from going out excessively, usually for a period of 5–7 days each year, to avoid hazardous health complications.
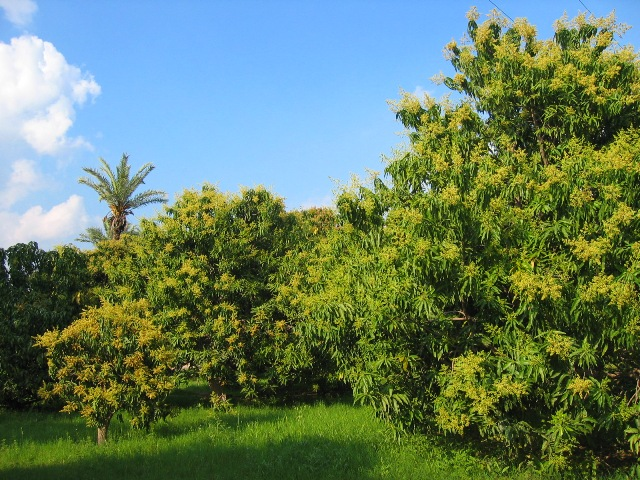
  Mango farm in Multan
- Fog does occur during the winter season, and remains for three days to multiple weeks. It also results in closure of Multan Airport at times of dense fog.
- Dust storm occur during summer months with peak in the months of May and June. These dust storm are quite violent. Dust storms during summer indicate arrival of monsoon while dust storms in winter mark the beginning of the winter season.
- Heat waves occur during May and June, and lead to a high incidence of heat strokes among the residents of the city during these months.
- South West Monsoon also occur in the summer from the month of June till September. Monsoon rains bring much awaited relief from the scorching heat of the summer. These monsoon rains are quite heavy.
- Continental air prevails during the period when there is no precipitation in the city.

== Seasons ==
Multan has four seasons: winter, summer, autumn, and spring. The monsoon season also occurs in summer.

=== Winter ===
The winter season begins from the month of December and lasts till February. Western Disturbance influence the winter season. The average lowest January temperature in the season of winter is 4.5 °C (40.1 °F). While the average highest temperature in winter was recorded in the month of December which is of 22.7 °C (72.9 °F). Heavy rains occur in winter which decrease the temperature further. Hailstorms also occur due to Western Disturbance. The highest monthly rainfall in winter occurs in February that is 9.2 millimetres (0.36 in). Lowest temperature In Multan in Winter was recorded back in Unknown date of -2.2 °C at the very chilling morning of January.

=== Spring ===
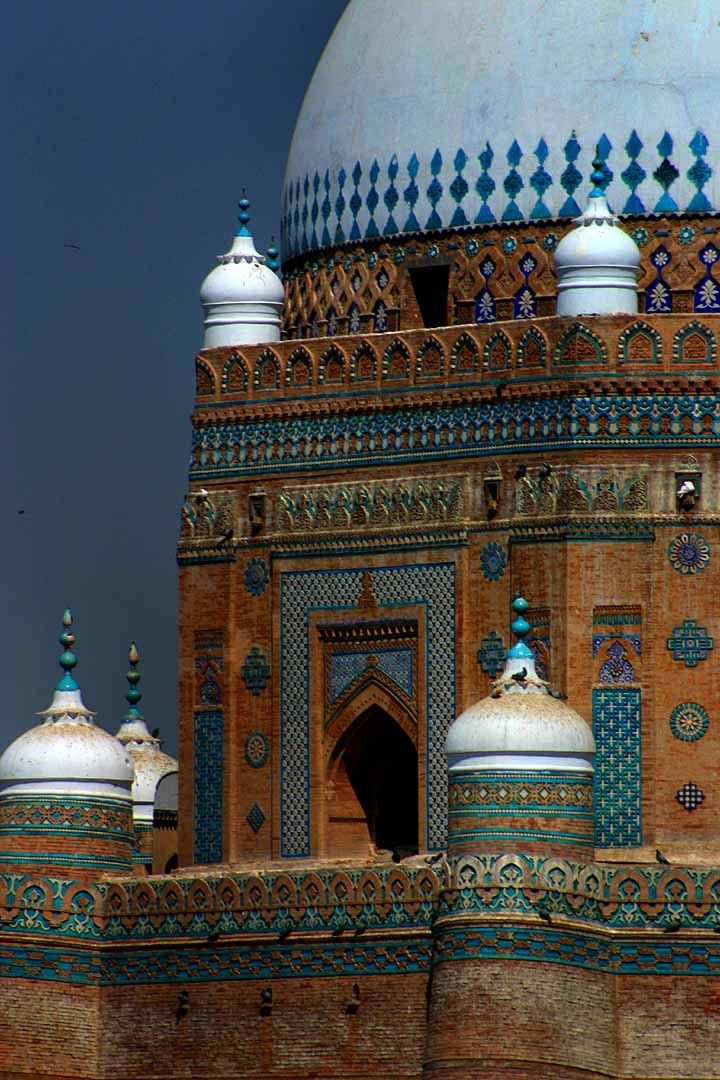
Bright blue sky behind the mausoleum of Rukn-e-Alam

The spring season begins from March and last till April. As soon as spring begins many flower shows are held across the city. The highest average temperature of 35 °C (95 °F) in spring season was recorded in April while the lowest is recorded in March that is 13.5 °C (56.3 °F). Rains are rare in the spring season. The highest average monthly rainfall was recorded in the month of March that is 19.5 millimetres (0.77 in).

=== Summer ===
The summer season begins from May and last till September. Summer is the longest season of Multan. Monsoon rains also occur in this season, these rains begin from June till September. Extremely high temperatures are recorded in summer. Violent dust storms occur in May and June while almost all the summer Loo blow that causes the traffic to remain thin. Heavy rains also occur during monsoon season. The highest average temperature recorded in Summer is recorded in June that is 46 °C (115 °F) while the lowest was recorded in September that is 24.9 °C (76.8 °F). Record-breaking highest temperature of 51 °C (124 °F) was recorded on 27 May 2010. The heaviest rainfall for Multan also occurred in summer on 8 August 2010 when 120 millimetres (4.7 in) of rain was recorded in 24 hours. While the most wettest month of summer is July as the highest average monthly rainfall is 62 millimetres (2.4 in).

=== Autumn ===
This season begins from October and ends in November. Hazy and dry weather is the main factor of Autumn. The highest average temperature was record in the month of October that is 34 °C (93 °F) and the lowest average temperature is 10.9 °C (51.6 °F)recorded in November. Showers do occur in this season late in November. The highest monthly average rainfall of Autumn is 2.1 millimetres (0.083 in) recorded in the month of October.

== Heat waves ==
Being close to Thar and Rajasthan deserts. Multan has seen some worst heat waves in the history of Pakistan

- In 1956, about 49 °C (120 °F) was recorded.
- In 2006, 47 °C (117 °F) was recorded that killed 33 people.
- In 2010, record-breaking heat wave was observed all over Pakistan, and in Multan fifty four year record was broken when temperature touched 50 °C (122 °F) on 27 May.

== Monsoon rainfall for Multan ==
The average monsoon rainfall for Multan is 199.7 millimetres (7.86 in), following is the monsoon rainfall of Multan since 2005;

- In 2005, a total of 173 millimetres (6.8 in) rainfall was recorded.
- In 2005, a total of 214 millimetres (8.4 in) rainfall was recorded.
- In 2006, a total of 235 millimetres (9.3 in) rainfall was recorded.
- In 2008, a total of 170 millimetres (6.7 in) rainfall was recorded.
- In 2009, a total of 256 millimetres (10.1 in) rainfall was recorded.
- In 2010, a total of 227 millimetres (8.9 in) rainfall was recorded.
- In 2011, a total of 112.2 millimetres (4.42 in) rainfall was recorded.
- In 2012, a total of 348 millimeter of rainfall was recorded.

== See also ==
- Climate of Lahore
- List of extreme weather records in Pakistan
