= Climate of Faisalabad =

Coordinates: 31°15′0″N 73°03′0″E

The climate of Faisalabad features a semi-arid climate (BSh) in Köppen-Geiger classification, bordering a humid subtropical climate (Cwa) with very hot and humid summers, and dry cool winters. The average maximum and minimum temperatures in June are 45.5 °C (113.9 °F) and 26.9 °C (80.4 °F). In January, the average minimum and maximum are 19.4 °C (66.9 °F) and 4.1 °C (39.4 °F).

The summer season starts in mid-April and continues until late October. May and June are the hottest months, while July, August, and the first half of September can be oppressively humid, except for the days when it rains. June is the hottest month in Faisalabad, when conditions are dry and dust storms are common. The coldest month is January, which is also a dry month with significant foggy days. The fog is particularly dense at night and in early morning hours. The winter season starts in November and continues until early February. Spring begins after mid-February and lasts usually until late March, when temperatures begin to rise and conditions become drier and sunnier. The average annual rainfall is only about 602 millimetres (23.7 in), which is highly seasonal since approximately half of the yearly rainfall takes place in June, July, August and September during the monsoon season.

Climate data for Faisalabad (2021)
Month	Jan	Feb	Mar	Apr	May	Jun	Jul	Aug	Sep	Oct	Nov	Dec	Year
Record high °C (°F)	26.6 (79.9)	30.8 (87.4)	38 (100)	44 (111)	47.5 (117.5)	48 (118)	46.1 (115.0)	42 (108)	41.1 (106.0)	40 (104)	36.1 (97.0)	29.2 (84.6)	48 (118)
Mean daily maximum °C (°F)	19.4 (66.9)	22.2 (72.0)	27.4 (81.3)	34.2 (93.6)	39.7 (103.5)	41.0 (105.8)	37.7 (99.9)	36.5 (97.7)	36.6 (97.9)	33.9 (93.0)	28.2 (82.8)	22.1 (71.8)	31.6 (88.9)
Mean daily minimum °C (°F)	4.8 (40.6)	7.6 (45.7)	12.6 (54.7)	18.3 (64.9)	24.1 (75.4)	27.6 (81.7)	27.9 (82.2)	27.2 (81.0)	24.5 (76.1)	17.7 (63.9)	10.4 (50.7)	6.1 (43.0)	17.4 (63.3)
Record low °C (°F)	−4 (25)	−2 (28)	1 (34)	7 (45)	13 (55)	17 (63)	19 (66)	18.6 (65.5)	15.6 (60.1)	9 (48)	2 (36)	−1.3 (29.7)	−4 (25)
Average precipitation mm (inches)	16 (0.6)	28 (1.1)	33 (1.3)	44 (1.7)	51 (2.0)	89 (3.5)	169 (6.7)	147 (5.8)	72 (2.8)	35 (1.4)	22 (0.9)	8 (0.3)	668 (26.3)

== Weather extremes ==
The temperature of the city has reached a summer maximum record temperature of 48.0 °C (118.4 °F), which was observed on 9 June 1947 and again on 26 May 2010. An extreme minimum temperature of −4.0 °C (24.8 °F) was recorded on 15 January 1978. The record 24-hour rainfall stands at a massive 264.2 millimetres (10.40 in) recorded on 5 September 1961, which is roughly 70 percent of the city's annual average rainfall. The highest wind gust ever recorded in Faisalabad occurred during a severe dust-thunderstorm on 2 June 2000, when the maximum wind speed reached 151 kilometres per hour (94 mph; 82 kn).

== Rare Snowfall in Faisalabad January 1909 ==
Although snowfall is extremely rare in Faisalabad, on 24 January 1909, the city experienced a brief snowfall during a strong cold wave. Snow lightly covered rooftops and fields for about 2 hours, marking one of the very few times snow has been seen there.

== Wind ==
Apart from temperature and rainfall records, the winds in Faisalabad are generally light. The city lies in an area with low wind speeds.A Westerly breeze dominates the afternoons, while the nights are calm. Southeasterly winds are common here during the monsoon season. Faisalabad, being in the plains, can experience severe thunderstorms and high wind gusts that can be damaging to its crops.

Faisalabad (1990-2012)

Climate chart (precipitation, max. and min. temperature)
J	F	M	A	M	J	J	A	S	O	N	D
12 19 4	26 22 7	36 27 12	57 34 18	69 38 23	138 41 27	195 37 27	140 36 27	69 36 24	34 33 17	13 27 10	8.6 21 5
- █ Average max. and min. temperatures in °C
- █ Precipitation totals in mm
- Source: World Meteorological Organization
Imperial conversion
J	F	M	A	M	J	J	A	S	O	N	D
0.5 67 39	1 71 45	1.4 80 54	2.2 92 64	2.7 101 73	5.4 105 80	7.7 99 81	5.5 97 80	2.7 96 75	1.3 91 63	0.5 81 50	0.3 71 41
- █ Average max. and min. temperatures in °F
- █ Precipitation totals in inches

== See also ==
- Climate of Lahore
- Climate of Rawalpindi
- Climate of Islamabad
- List of extreme weather records in Pakistan
