= Climate of Peshawar =

Peshawar

Climate chart (precipitation, max. and min. temperature)
J	F	M	A	M	J	J	A	S	O	N	D
40 18 5	70 20 8	78 25 12	68 31 17	27 37 22	25 40 26	69 37 27	69 36 26	35 35 23	27 31 17	17 25 10	17 21 6
- █ Average max. and min. temperatures in °C
- █ Precipitation totals in mm
Imperial conversion
J	F	M	A	M	J	J	A	S	O	N	D
1.6 65 40	2.8 68 46	3.1 76 54	2.7 87 63	1.1 98 72	1 103 78	2.7 99 80	2.7 97 79	1.4 95 74	1.1 88 63	0.7 77 51	0.7 69 42
- █ Average max. and min. temperatures in °F
- █ Precipitation totals in inches

Peshawar is located near the eastern end of the Khyber Pass and sits mainly on the Iranian plateau along with the rest of the Khyber-Pakhtunkhwa. Peshawar is literally a frontier city of South-Central Asia and was historically part of the Silk Road.

The Valley of Peshawar is covered with consolidated deposits of silt, sands and gravel of recent geological times. The flood Plains/Zones are the areas between Kabul River and Budni Nala. The meander flood plain extends from Warsak in the Northwest towards Southeast in the upper Northern half of the district. The Kabul river enters the district in the Northwest. On entering the Peshawar Plain, the Kabul River is divided into several channels. Its two main channels are the Adizai River Eastward flows along the boundary with Charsadda District. Another channel branching from the right bank of the Naguman River is the Shah Alam, which again merges with Naguman River further in the East. In general the sub-soil strata is composed of gravels, boulders, and sands overlain by silts and clays. Sand, gravel and boulders are important aquifer extends to a depth of about 200 feet (61 m). As further confined water bearing aquifer occurs at depths greater than 400 feet (120 m).

Winter in Peshawar starts from mid November to the end of March. Summer months are May to September. The mean maximum temperature in summer is over 40 °C (104 °F) and the mean minimum temperature is 25 °C (77 °F).

Peshawar experiences long and intensely hot summers because of its location in a lowland valley at the edge of the Khyber Pass. From May through September, daily maximum temperatures often rise above 42 °C (108 °F), with June and July being the hottest months. The limited elevation and drier conditions of the valley allow heat to build up more strongly than in many nearby cities. Compared to Islamabad, which lies at a higher altitude, Peshawar’s summers are typically hotter and more prolonged. The mean minimum temperature during winter is 4 °C (39 °F) and maximum is 18.35 °C (65.03 °F). Snowfall is not uncommon in Khyber hills and hayatabad in strong cold spells.

Peshawar is not situated in the monsoon region, unlike the other northern parts of Pakistan. But occasionally monsoon currents make it as far as Peshawar causing downpours. This can be witnessed in the erratic monsoon of 2015 when the monsoon moisture was going well into eastern Afghanistan. The winter rainfall due to western disturbances shows a higher record during the months of February and April. The highest winter rainfall has been recorded in March, while the highest summer rainfall in the month of August. The average winter rainfall is higher than that of the summer. Based on a 30-year record, the average 30-year annual precipitation has been recorded as 500 millimetres (20 in). The relative humidity varies from 46% in June to 76% in August.

Peshawar's environment has suffered tremendously due to an ever-increasing population, unplanned growth and a poor regulatory framework. Air and noise pollution is a significant issue in several parts of the city, and the water quality, once considered to be exceptionally good, is also fast deteriorating.

== Snowfall ==
Snowfall in Peshawar is an extremely rare occurrence because of the city’s low elevation (359 m) and semi-arid climate. The surrounding uplands such as Cherat and the Khyber Hills receive snow more frequently, but within Peshawar itself only a few instances have been recorded.

The most notable event occurred during a severe cold wave in February 1929, when snow fell in both Peshawar and Rawalpindi. The Civil & Military Gazette (Lahore) reported that "Peshawar witnessed a brief fall of snow, while Rawalpindi was blanketed in heavier flakes under sub-freezing temperatures."

Weather observations recorded temperatures around 2.0 °C in Peshawar, while Rawalpindi fell to −2.5 °C. These readings were taken with standard mercury thermometers of the period. The Morning Post (Delhi) confirmed the figures, noting that "snowflakes in Peshawar soon melted, in contrast to Rawalpindi’s heavier snow."

Since 1929, no widespread snowfall has been officially reported in Peshawar. Later winter storms have occasionally produced sleet or light snow in the city, while snowfall has generally remained confined to nearby higher elevations such as Cherat and the Khyber Hills.

In addition the city has lost 2,700 acres (1,100 ha) of agriculture land during the two decades (1965–85). This in the addition to 400 acres (160 ha) of vacant land that has been also eaten up by expending urban functions. In the same period, the land under parks and green space has shrunk from 163 to 75 acres (66–30 ha).

Climate data for Peshawar (1991–2020 normals)
Month	Jan	Feb	Mar	Apr	May	Jun	Jul	Aug	Sep	Oct	Nov	Dec	Year
Record high °C (°F)	27.0 (80.6)	30.0 (86.0)	37.5 (99.5)	42.4 (108.3)	45.2 (113.4)	48.0 (118.4)	46.6 (115.9)	46.0 (114.8)	42.0 (107.6)	38.5 (101.3)	35.0 (95.0)	29.0 (84.2)	48.0 (118.4)
Mean daily maximum °C (°F)	18.1 (64.6)	20.1 (68.2)	24.7 (76.5)	30.6 (87.1)	36.5 (97.7)	39.6 (103.3)	37.4 (99.3)	35.9 (96.6)	34.8 (94.6)	31.0 (87.8)	25.2 (77.4)	20.6 (69.1)	29.5 (85.2)
Daily mean °C (°F)	11.3 (52.3)	13.8 (56.8)	18.2 (64.8)	23.9 (75.0)	29.4 (84.9)	32.7 (90.9)	32.1 (89.8)	30.9 (87.6)	29.0 (84.2)	24.1 (75.4)	17.8 (64.0)	13.2 (55.8)	23.0 (73.5)
Mean daily minimum °C (°F)	4.6 (40.3)	7.6 (45.7)	12.2 (54.0)	17.2 (63.0)	22.3 (72.1)	25.8 (78.4)	26.8 (80.2)	26.0 (78.8)	23.2 (73.8)	17.1 (62.8)	10.4 (50.7)	5.6 (42.1)	16.6 (61.8)
Record low °C (°F)	−3.9 (25.0)	−1.0 (30.2)	1.7 (35.1)	6.7 (44.1)	11.7 (53.1)	13.3 (55.9)	18.0 (64.4)	19.4 (66.9)	12.0 (53.6)	8.3 (46.9)	1.1 (34.0)	−1.3 (29.7)	−3.9 (25.0)
Average precipitation mm (inches)	39.8 (1.57)	69.9 (2.75)	78.2 (3.08)	68.1 (2.68)	26.7 (1.05)	25.4 (1.00)	69.0 (2.72)	68.5 (2.70)	34.8 (1.37)	26.7 (1.05)	16.9 (0.67)	17.3 (0.68)	541.3 (21.32)
Average precipitation days (≥ 1.0 mm)	3.9	5.7	7.6	5.8	4.6	2.1	4.4	5.0	3.0	2.5	2.1	2.1	48.8
Mean monthly sunshine hours	195.5	189.5	194.5	231.3	297.1	299.5	273.8	263.2	257.3	266.1	234.8	184.4	2,887
Source 1: NOAA (sun, 1961–1990)
Source 2: PMD
