= Climate of Lahore =

Lahore

Climate chart (precipitation, max. and min. temperature)
J	F	M	A	M	J	J	A	S	O	N	D
22 18 8	40 22 11	44 28 16	26 34 21	27 39 26	85 39 27	196 36 27	185 35 27	89 34 25	13 32 20	6.9 27 14	19 21 9
- █ Average max. and min. temperatures in °C
- █ Precipitation totals in mm
Imperial conversion
J	F	M	A	M	J	J	A	S	O	N	D
0.9 65 46	1.6 72 51	1.7 82 60	1 94 70	1.1 102 78	3.3 102 81	7.7 96 81	7.3 94 80	3.5 94 78	0.5 90 68	0.3 81 57	0.7 71 48
- █ Average max. and min. temperatures in °F
- █ Precipitation totals in inches

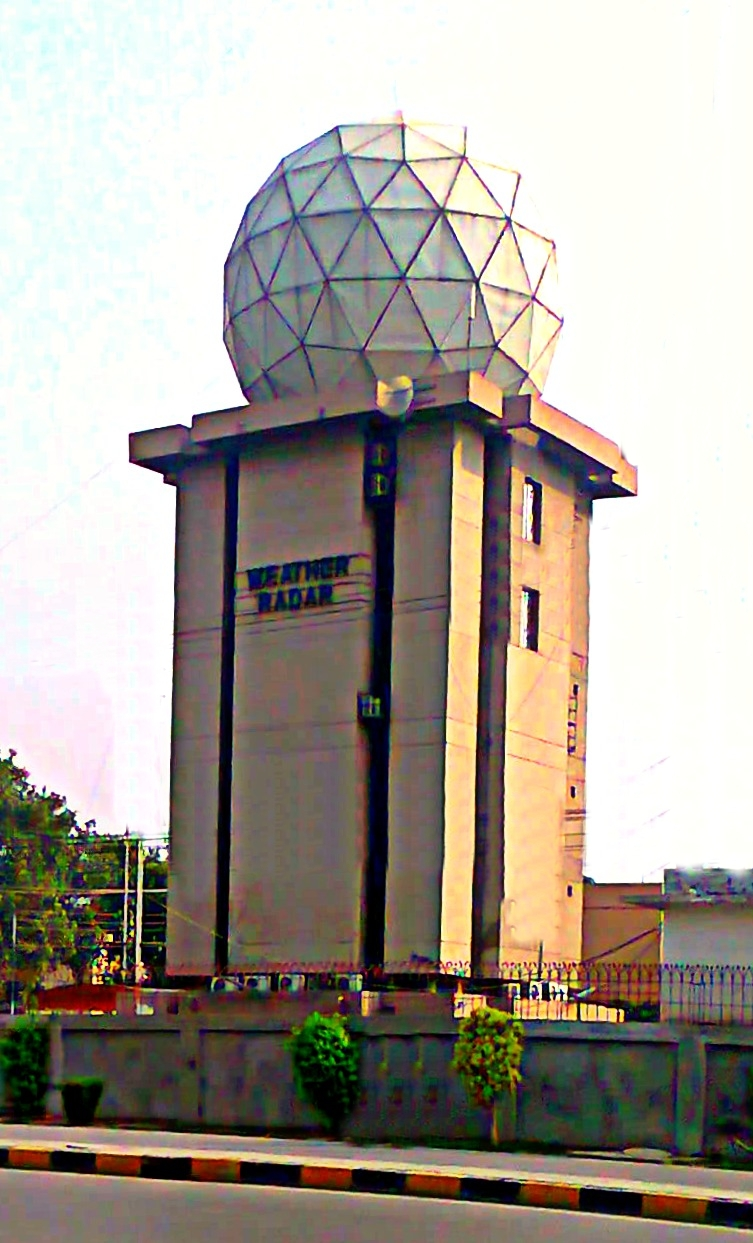
Weather radar of Lahore, located on Jail Road.

Lahore features a five-season hot semi-arid climate (Köppen BSh), bordering a humid subtropical climate, with five seasons: foggy winter (1 December – 15 February) with few western disturbances causing rain; pleasant spring (16 February – 15 April); summer (15 April – 30 June) with dust, rainstorms and heatwave periods; rainy monsoon (1 July – 16 September); and dry autumn (16September–14November). However, in some cases, it can be classified as being humid subtropical (Cwa), rather than semi-arid, since it has well–defined seasons and an ample amount of rain. It occasionally has very prolonged and dense monsoons, typical of a humid subtropical climate.

The hottest month is June, where average highs routinely exceed 40 °C or 104 °F. The wettest month is July, with heavy rainfalls and evening thunderstorms with the possibility of cloudbursts. The coolest month is January with dense fog.

The city's record high temperature was 48.3 °C (118.9 °F), recorded on 30 May 1944. On 10 June 2007, a temperature of 48 °C (118 °F) was recorded; The lowest temperature recorded in Lahore is –2.2 °C, recorded on 17 January 1935.

Climate data for Lahore (1991–2020 normals, extremes 1931–present)
Month	Jan	Feb	Mar	Apr	May	Jun	Jul	Aug	Sep	Oct	Nov	Dec	Year
Record high °C (°F)	27.8 (82.0)	33.3 (91.9)	37.8 (100.0)	46.1 (115.0)	48.3 (118.9)	47.2 (117.0)	46.1 (115.0)	42.8 (109.0)	41.7 (107.1)	40.6 (105.1)	35.0 (95.0)	30.0 (86.0)	48.3 (118.9)
Mean daily maximum °C (°F)	18.4 (65.1)	22.2 (72.0)	27.5 (81.5)	34.2 (93.6)	38.9 (102.0)	38.9 (102.0)	35.6 (96.1)	34.7 (94.5)	34.4 (93.9)	32.4 (90.3)	27.1 (80.8)	21.4 (70.5)	30.5 (86.9)
Daily mean °C (°F)	13.1 (55.6)	16.5 (61.7)	21.6 (70.9)	27.7 (81.9)	32.3 (90.1)	33.2 (91.8)	31.3 (88.3)	30.8 (87.4)	29.9 (85.8)	26.3 (79.3)	20.4 (68.7)	15.1 (59.2)	24.9 (76.7)
Mean daily minimum °C (°F)	7.6 (45.7)	10.8 (51.4)	15.7 (60.3)	21.1 (70.0)	25.6 (78.1)	27.4 (81.3)	27.1 (80.8)	26.9 (80.4)	25.3 (77.5)	20.1 (68.2)	13.7 (56.7)	8.8 (47.8)	19.2 (66.5)
Record low °C (°F)	−2.2 (28.0)	0.0 (32.0)	2.8 (37.0)	10.0 (50.0)	14.0 (57.2)	17.8 (64.0)	20.0 (68.0)	19.0 (66.2)	16.7 (62.1)	8.3 (46.9)	1.0 (33.8)	−1.1 (30.0)	−2.2 (28.0)
Average precipitation mm (inches)	21.9 (0.86)	31.5 (1.24)	31.5 (1.24)	19.5 (0.77)	17.7 (0.70)	73.8 (2.91)	188.6 (7.43)	177.1 (6.97)	88.6 (3.49)	10.3 (0.41)	6.9 (0.27)	6.8 (0.27)	674.2 (26.56)
Average precipitation days (≥ 1.0 mm)	2.5	3.5	3.6	2.8	2.9	5.0	9.1	8.7	4.9	1.1	1.9	1.1	47.1
Average relative humidity (%)	66	58	53	42	36	42	66	70	63	58	53	67	56
Mean monthly sunshine hours	218.8	215.0	245.8	256.1	308.3	269.0	227.5	234.9	265.6	290.0	229.6	222.9	2,983.5
Mean daily sunshine hours	7.1	7.6	7.9	9.2	9.9	9.0	7.3	7.6	8.9	9.4	8.7	7.2	8.3
Source 1: NOAA (sun 1961–1990), Deutscher Wetterdienst (humidity 1951–1990, daily sun 1961–1990)
Source 2: PMD

== Factors ==
Monsoons and western disturbances are the two main factors that affect the weather in Lahore; otherwise, continental air prevails for rest of the seasons. Following are the main factors that influence the weather of Lahore.

- Western disturbances generally occur during the winter months and cause moderate rainfall; rarely, hailstorms also occur.
- Fog is dense during the winter season and remains for days to weeks.
- Dust storms occur during summer months, peaking in May and June.
- Heat waves are intense in May and June.
- Southwest monsoons also occur in the summer, from June until September. These heavy monsoon rains bring relief from scorching heat.
- Continental air prevails during the period when there is no precipitation in the city.

== Monsoon rainfall ==
Gulberg covered in hail from a hailstorm on 26 February 2011.

The average annual rainfall precipitation in Lahore amounts to around 758.8 millimetres (29.87 in). Monsoon rains commence from the last week of June and persist until the end of September. In 2009, Lahore saw below-normal monsoon rainfall due to the presence of El Niño over Pakistan. Following are monsoon rainfall precipitation data for Lahore since 2007, taken from the Pakistan Meteorological Department:

- 2003: 377 millimetres (14.8 in)
- 2005: 426 millimetres (16.8 in)
- 2006: 606 millimetres (23.9 in)
- 2007: 531 millimetres (20.9 in)
- 2008: 800 millimetres (31.5 in)
- 2009: 518 millimetres (20.4 in)
- 2010: 711 millimetres (28.0 in)
- 2011: 1,439 millimetres (56.7 in)
- 2012: 576.2 millimetres (22.69 in)
- 2013: 1,430 millimetres (56.3 in)

== Annual rainfall ==
Lahore mainly receives its rainfall during the monsoon season from June till September, and in winter season from December till February. The highest-ever annual rainfall in Lahore was recorded in 2011 when 1,576.8 millimetres (62.08 in) of rainfall was recorded. Lahore received below normal rains in 2009, and normal rains in 2007 and 2010. The following is the Annual rainfall in Lahore since 2007 based on data from the Pakistan Meteorological Department.

- In 2007, a total of 716 millimetres (28.19 in)} rain was recorded.
- In 2008, a total of 917 millimetres (36.10 in)} rain was recorded.
- In 2009, a total of 698.4 millimetres (27.50 in)} rain was recorded.
- In 2010, a total of 738 millimetres (29.06 in)} rain was recorded.
- In 2011, a total of 1,576.8 millimetres (62.08 in) rain was recorded as of 21 September 2011.

== Extreme weather events ==
On 26 February 2011, Lahore received an isolated but strong hailstorm measuring 4.5 cm that carpeted several roads of the city. The hailstorm was the heaviest in Lahore for the last 30 years. Usually, hailstorms occur in the plain areas of the Punjab province during the winter season. The hailstorm lasted for 30 minutes intermittently with heavy rain showers. According to the Pakistan Meteorological Department, the city received 12 millimetres (0.47 in) of rain and 4.5 centimetres (1.8 in) of hail at the airport (liquid precipitation).

== See also ==
- Climate of Pakistan
- List of extreme weather records in Pakistan
