= Climate of Karachi =

Coordinates: 24°51′N 67°02′E

Karachi has a tropical semi arid climate (Köppen: BSh; Trewartha: BShb), albeit a moderate version of this climate, influenced by monsoons. Karachi has a tropical climate, despite being located slightly above the Tropic of Cancer. It is situated in the monsoon region of Pakistan. It is located on the coast bordering the Arabian Sea, and as a result, has a relatively mild climate. However, in more recent years, rainfall has become more abundant, with annual rainfall projected to reach over 500 mm by 2100. For this reason, the city may be classed as almost semi-arid (BSh), since it has a mild climate with a short but defined wet season, along with a lengthy dry season.

Karachi has two main seasons; summer and winter, while spring and autumn are very short. The Summer season persists for the longest period during the year. Karachi also receives the rains from late June to mid-September (Monsoon). The city experiences a tropical climate encompassing warm and dry winters and very hot, humid and rainy summers. The humidity levels usually remain high from March to November, while they are very low in winter as the wind direction in winter is north-east. The temperature in winter season sometimes goes below 10 °C and day temperature is about 26 °C.

On 27 December 2021, the metropolis broke a 13-year record and experienced the coldest day with the maximum temperature dropping to 19 °C (66 °F).

== Charts ==
Climate data for Karachi
Month	Jan	Feb	Mar	Apr	May	Jun	Jul	Aug	Sep	Oct	Nov	Dec	Year
Record high °C (°F)	32.8 (91.0)	36.5 (97.7)	42.5 (108.5)	44.4 (111.9)	47.8 (118.0)	45.0 (113.0)	42.2 (108.0)	41.7 (107.1)	42.8 (109.0)	43.3 (109.9)	38.5 (101.3)	34.5 (94.1)	47.8 (118.0)
Mean daily maximum °C (°F)	28.2 (82.8)	28.4 (83.1)	32.2 (90.0)	34.7 (94.5)	35.5 (95.9)	35.4 (95.7)	33.3 (91.9)	32.1 (89.8)	33.2 (91.8)	35.5 (95.9)	32.5 (90.5)	28.2 (82.8)	32.4 (90.4)
Daily mean °C (°F)	20.5 (68.9)	21.2 (70.2)	25.4 (77.7)	28.8 (83.8)	31.0 (87.8)	31.8 (89.2)	30.4 (86.7)	29.2 (84.6)	28.7 (83.7)	27.8 (82.0)	24.6 (76.3)	20.4 (68.7)	26.6 (80.0)
Mean daily minimum °C (°F)	12.7 (54.9)	14.0 (57.2)	18.6 (65.5)	23.0 (73.4)	26.6 (79.9)	28.3 (82.9)	27.6 (81.7)	26.3 (79.3)	25.6 (78.1)	21.9 (71.4)	16.8 (62.2)	12.7 (54.9)	21.2 (70.1)
Record low °C (°F)	0.0 (32.0)	3.3 (37.9)	7.0 (44.6)	12.2 (54.0)	17.7 (63.9)	22.1 (71.8)	22.2 (72.0)	20.0 (68.0)	18.0 (64.4)	10.0 (50.0)	6.1 (43.0)	1.3 (34.3)	0.0 (32.0)
Average precipitation mm (inches)	8.6 (0.34)	9.4 (0.37)	15.3 (0.60)	15.7 (0.62)	6.1 (0.24)	55.8 (2.20)	93.2 (3.67)	78.9 (3.11)	29.6 (1.17)	17.6 (0.69)	0.4 (0.02)	2.8 (0.11)	333.4 (13.14)
Average precipitation days	0.7	0.8	0.7	1.2	0.1	3.9	6.5	6.3	1.7	1.3	0.1	0.7	24
Source 1: PMD (2022)
Source 2:

== January ==
The month of January is the coolest month of the year in the city, with mostly clear skies and a constant N, NE breeze blowing. The influx of very cold and very dry Siberian winds (called "Quetta Waves" in common parlance), bring brief and cold spells to the region, dropping the night temperatures to below 10 degrees Celsius. Western Disturbances from the Persian Gulf and Iran affect the city during this time, bringing with them light rainfall. The highest rainfall during this month was 89.3 millimetres (3.52 in), which was recorded in 1995. The highest temperature of 32.8 °C (91.0 °F) was recorded in January 2018. The average high for the month is 24.6 °C while the average low for the month is a mild 6 °C.

The lowest temperature was 0.0 °C on January 21-1934

From January 22-31 2026 a week long severe coldwave gripped Karachi bringing icy Siberian winds dropping the temperature to 6°C making the feels like temperature 4°C due to cold winds

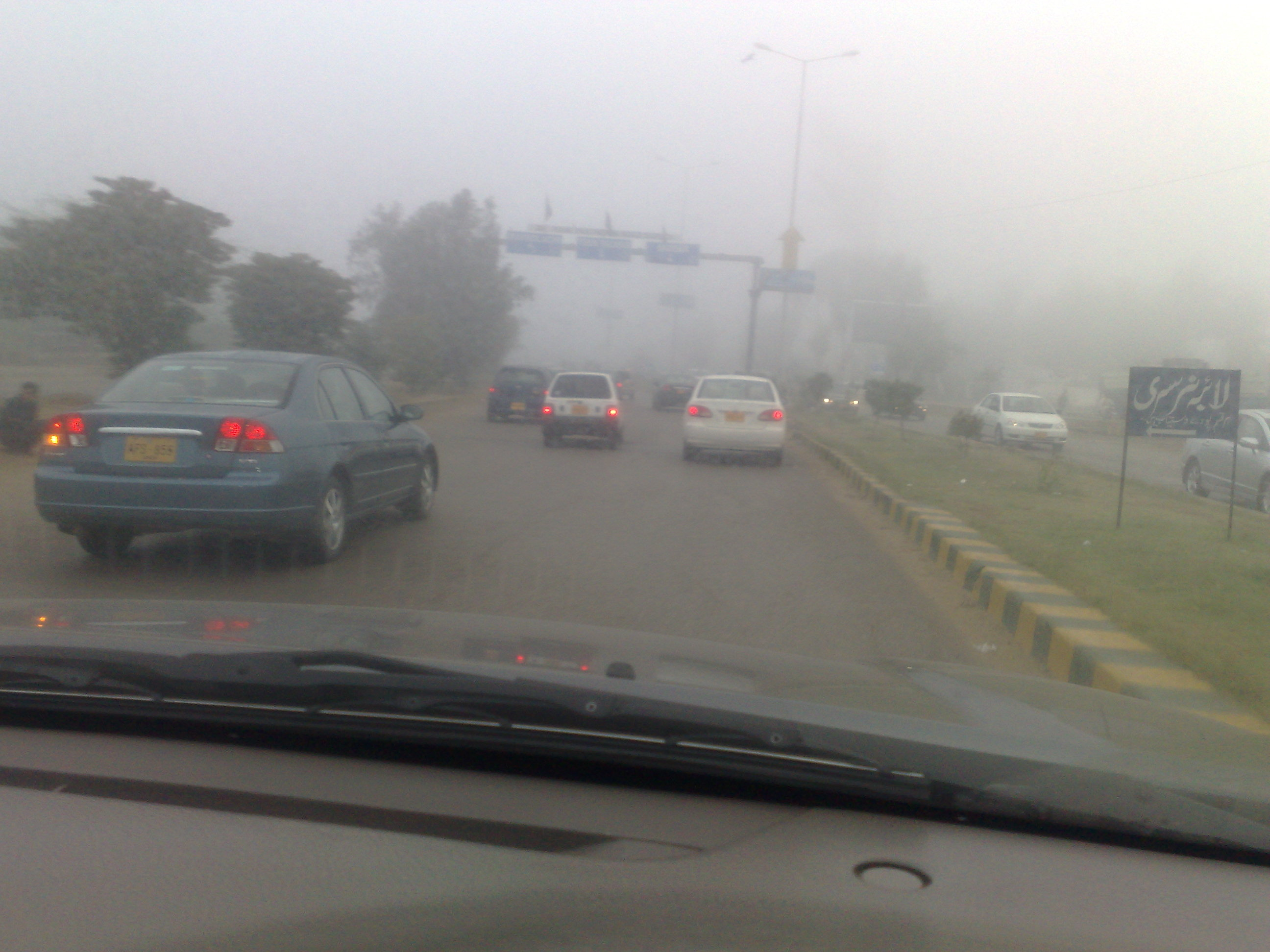
Foggy morning in the winter of Karachi.

== February ==
The cold waves can affect the metropolis until the middle of the month, after which a warming trend begins in the city. The relative humidity also tends to increase after the middle of the month. The lowest temperature was 3.3 °C (37.9 °F) on 11 February 1950 and the highest was 36.5 °C (97.7 °F) on 27 February 2016. The highest monthly rainfall of 96 millimetres (3.8 in) was recorded in 1979. Western depressions can continue to affect the city during this month, often causing overcast skies and light to moderate rainfall. The intensity of rainfall in February is relatively higher compared to the preceding month. The average high for the month is a pleasant 27.7 °C whereas the lows hover around 15 °C. However, on the night on 3-February-2024 a strong thunderstorm along with heavy rain ripped Karachi bringing 75-77mm in just 1.5 hours which is the second highest rainfall since 1979 of February

== March ==
Weather turns quite warm with the start of March, with increasing humidity and intensity of sunshine. The highest temperature was recorded at 42 °C in 2004, and then again in 2010 and 2022. March is considered spring time in the city, when the skies are usually clear blue and W/SW breeze dominates, making the outdoors much more pleasant. Western depressions can bring moderate to at times even heavy rainfall. In the recent years, Karachi has received quite heavy rainfall in the month of March, for instance on 18 March 1997, the city received 25 mm rainfall from an overnight thunderstorm. On 11 March 2007, a strong western depression gave up to 35 mm rainfall in the city, during which intermittent moderate to heavy rain continued in the metropolis from morning until midnight. On 19 March 2007, once again an isolated heavy downpour lashed the city, in which the northern parts (North Karachi) received 53 mm rainfall in less than an hour, while other areas received lesser precipitation.on 13 March 2015, an overnight dose of heavy rain lashed mainly the southern and SE areas of the city. Between 10 and 15 mm rainfall was recorded in these areas within 15 minutes. However, Gulshan-e-Hadeed observatory (located ESE of the metropolis in the outskirts), received 40 mm downpour on the same night.Most recently on 1 March 2024 the city received heavy rainfall all day.The all-time high for the month was a mighty 130 millimetres (5.1 in), recorded in 1967, which is March's highest rainfall for the city. On March-18-2026 a deadly squall along with a severe thunderstorm and heavy rain ripped Karachi bringing wind speeds of 80-90km/h with some areas exceeding 90km/h+. The highest rainfall was reported in Korangi of 55.6mm while most areas saw 8-35mm in just one hour killing 21 people and injuring 27

== April ==
Moving into April, the temperatures and humidity see an increasing trend. The highest temperature of April was 44.4 °C (111.9 °F), recorded on 16 April 1947, while the lowest temperature of 12.2 °C (54.0 °F) was recorded on 29 April 1967. The highest monthly rainfall of 52.8 millimetres (2.08 in) was recorded in 1935. The average high for the month is 34.3 °C while the average low is 22.3 °C. Although it is rare for the metropolis to get rainfall in this month, in recent times, April 2013 was quite exceptional as the metropolis was blessed by heavy rain on three occasions: On 2 April 2013, a thunder storm gave heavy rain in northern parts of the city where 12.6 mm rain was recorded. On 8 April 2013, a strong western depression from the Persian Gulf affected the city, giving widespread heavy rainfall in the morning, accompanied by strong winds; a maximum of 28 mm rainfall was recorded. On 22 April 2013, a strong thunderstorm ripped across the metropolis at mid-day, giving very heavy rainfall specially in central, NW and southern parts of the city. Downtown (Saddar) observatory in south Karachi received an accumulation of 66 mm for the month, however, the record for the highest rainfall in April stands unbroken because the record of 52.8 mm in 1935 was set at the Airport observatory, while the total rainfall recorded at the Airport in April 2013 was 29 mm. The April 2015 was very warm in Karachi, as it was 2.4 °C warmer on average compared to a standard April. On 28-29 April 2023 Karachi's outskirts got rain while the most remained dry with only thunderclouds while on 30-April-2023 a cloudburst ripped in Bahria Town while other areas remained dry. On 14-April-2024 Karachi saw 29mm with thunderstorm and lightning. On 2-April-2026 an unusual major Western Disturbance dipped south bringing 25-45mm in most areas with isolated areas seeing 50-70mm continuing till midnight with temperature dipping to 16°C, the lowest since 1967

== May ==
May is the hottest month in Karachi, highest temperature was recorded on 9 May 1938, when temperatures reached 47.8 °C (118.0 °F) while the lowest temperature was 17.7 °C (63.9 °F), recorded on 4 May 1989. The humidity in the month is quite high, often surpassing 60% and coupled with temperatures ranging between 35 and 37 °C, the heat indices are generally quite high, making the outdoors highly uncomfortable. Rainfall in May is a rare occurrence. Recently, a very strong thunderstorm affected the metropolis early on 2 May 1997. 40 mm rainfall was recorded at Masroor Base, while the Airport received 6 mm rain. The highest monthly rain that occurred was in May 1933, when 33 millimetres (1.3 in) rain lashed the city. In 1999, 2001 and 2010, three major cyclones formed that came close to Karachi. The 1999 cyclone (the fourth strongest cyclone of the Arabian Sea) hit close to Karachi, along the coast of Thatta and Keti Bandar giving massive rainfall and causing widespread damage in these areas while the city of Karachi only received very strong NE winds, with light showers (traces). 2001 Indian Ocean cyclone was the third strongest cyclone of the Arabian Sea, that made landfall near the Indian border. Cyclone Phet formed in May 2010, about 1100 km away from Karachi. It travelled along the coast, striking Oman then affecting the coast of Balochistan, giving record-breaking rain amounts there. Gwadar, for instance, got 372 mm rainfall in 36 hours. In May 1902, a cyclonic storm struck the coast in the vicinity of Karachi.

== June ==
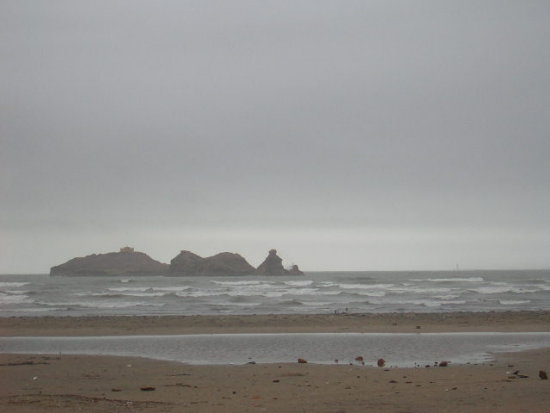
Drizzle is common in June as Pre-Monsoon rain.

The temperatures of June are almost identical to May, with just a slight decrease. The highest temperature of June was 47 °C (117 °F), recorded on 18 June 1979, and the lowest was 22.1 °C (71.8 °F), recorded on 3 June 1997. On 6 June 2010, Cyclone Phet came close to the coast of Karachi as a tropical depression, at about 50 km away from the city after a week-long journey. About 150 millimetres (5.9 in) of rain with 35 mph (56 km/h) winds struck the city. 95 mm rainfall was recorded at the Airport observatory whereas 150 mm was recorded at Masroor Base. That's why once again, the official record for highest rainfall in the month of June, which was set at the Airport observatory in June 2007 i.e. 110 mm, stands unbroken. The average maximum temperature for the month of June is 34.8 °C whereas the average low is 27.9 °C.

=== 2015 heat wave ===
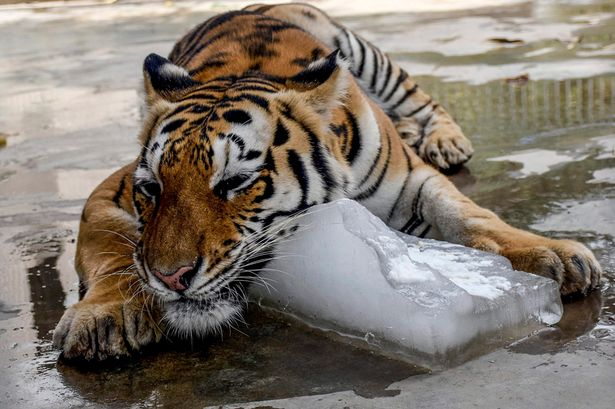
Tiger cools off in Karachi's Zoo during June 2015 Heat Wave.

June 2015 was incredibly hot and humid in Karachi, being 1.8 °C warmer than an average June in the metropolis. Between 18 June and 23 June 2015, a severe heatwave struck the city; during these days, the maximum temperature remained in the range of 40 °C to 45 °C whereas the minimum temperature was between 30 °C and 33 °C. Due to humidity levels ranging between 40 and 50%, coupled with high temperature, the heat indices recorded in the city were above 50 °C during these days. The highest temperature during this heatwave was 45 °C (reached first time since 8 June 2000, when the temperature had soared to 45.5 °C), recorded on 20 June 2015, while the minimum temperature on this day was 31 °C. On 21 June 2015, the highest temperature was 43 °C whereas the minimum was 33 °C. The abnormal heat and humidity, coupled with government specifically K-Electric's apathy towards the masses, claimed the lives of 1234 people in Karachi in one week.

== July ==
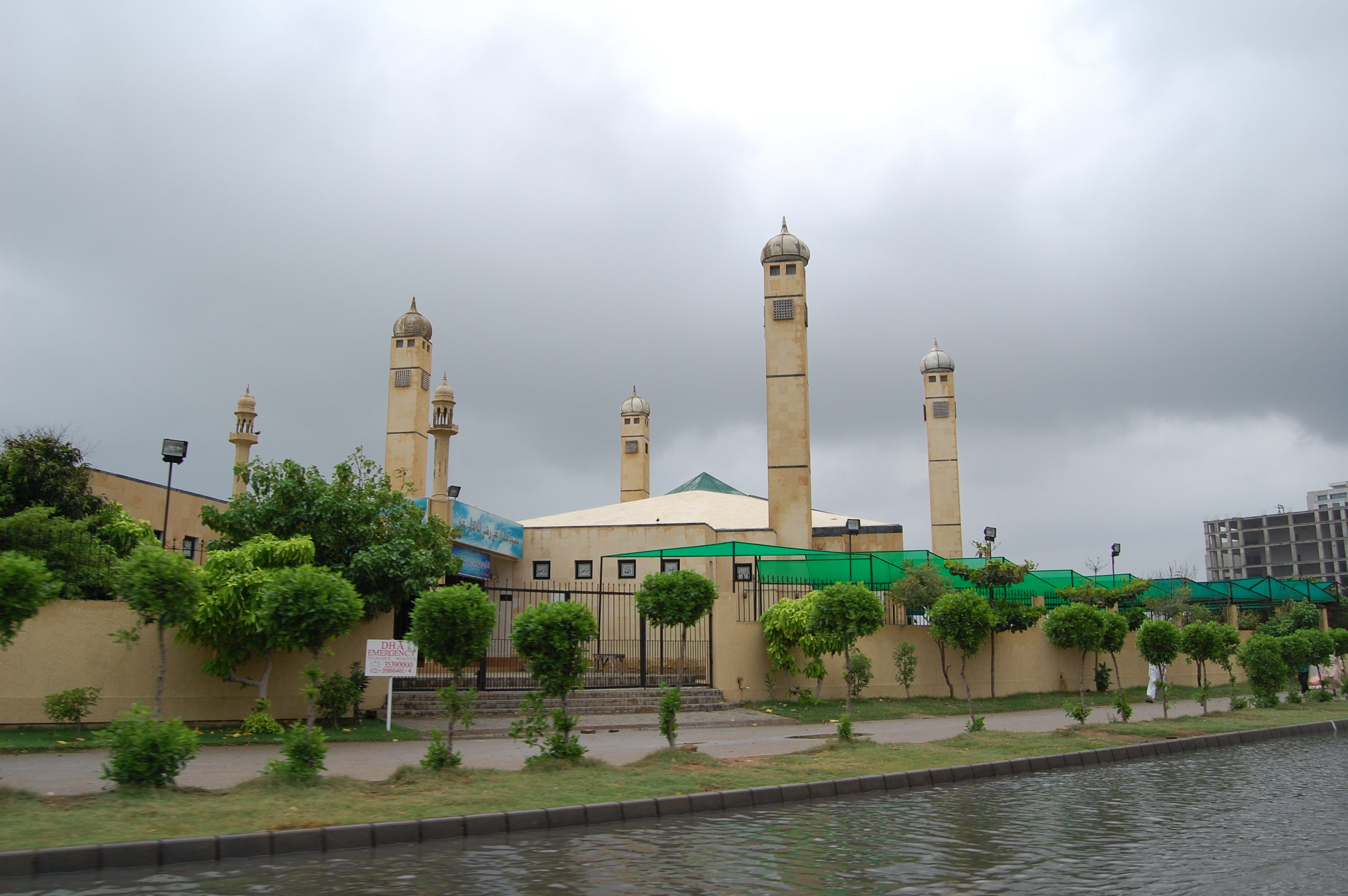
Monsoon cloud hovering over the city

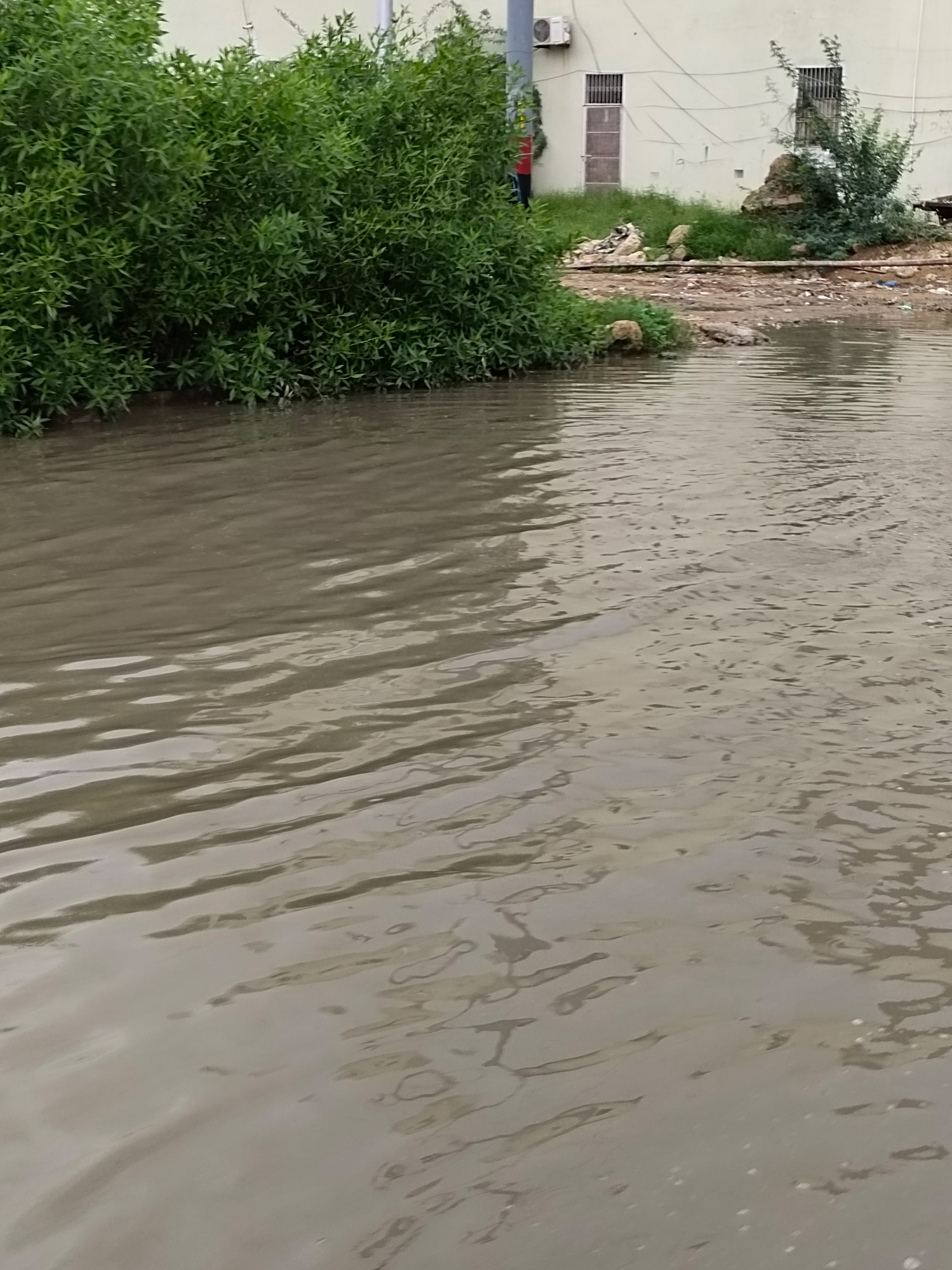
Karachi is badly affected by the yearly monsoon rains rendering the road network unusable. The above picture depicts a certain road in Karachi completely covered with rainwater. The situation arises due to yearly rainfall which causes urban flooding. Other factors are improper drainage facilities and chocked drains.

In the month of July, the city is likely to start receiving rainfall from monsoon systems, that strike the metropolis from the Indian states of Rajasthan or Gujarat. Fast breeze from the W/SW blows throughout the day with stratus clouds covering the sky for most part of the day and night, making the weather very pleasant. Drizzle increases in intensity in this month, mostly occurring during night and early morning. At times, showers of considerable intensity can also lash the metropolis from these weak clouds, causing up to a few millimetres of rain. Heavy rains lash the city when a strong monsoon system strikes the region. Average high for the month is 33.1 °C whereas average low is 27.4 °C. The highest July temperature of 42.2 °C (108.0 °F) was recorded on 3 July 1958 and the lowest temperature was 21.2 °C (70.2 °F) on 22 July 1997.The highest monthly rainfall was recorded on July 2022 with 605 mm rain. : Sindh province overall witnessed over 308% more rainfall than average during this historic monsoon spell.. On 27 July 1944, a cyclone left some 10,000 people homeless in Karachi. On July-18-2009 a strong monsoon system from Bay of Bengal gave 147mm one day while unofficial stations recorded 205mm

== August ==
The weather of August is identical to that of July. In 2006, after two years of drought (2004 and 2005), widespread rainfall of 77 millimetres (3.0 in) occurred in the city to break the drought period. Between 09 and 11 August 2007, a very strong tropical depression produced 191 millimetres (7.5 in) Intermittent moderate to heavy rain lashed the mega-city during these 48 hours. Another monsoon low produced 80 millimetres (3.1 in) of rain on 22 August 2007 The monsoon typically starts to get weak from the last week of August, but still has the potential to cause heavy rains in the city, as on 31 August 2009, when SE parts of the city received 148 mm rainfall, while precipitation in other areas varied between 40 and 70 mm. But history has shown that the monsoon withdraws from Karachi during the final days of August. The highest rainfall for August is 272.5 millimetres (10.73 in), which occurred in 1979. The highest temperature was 41.7 °C (107.1 °F) on 9 August 1964, while the lowest temperature was 21.0 °C (69.8 °F), recorded on 7 August 1984. The city's highest rainfall in 24 hours occurred on 27 August 2020, when 345 mm rain was officially recorded at PAF Base Faisal. However, unofficial records from DHA/Clifton areas put the total somewhere around 380 mm for 27 August 2020. Significantly, this total was achieved in just 12 hours, flooding the entire Southern district of the city.In 2025 after a unusually dry July, on August-19-2025 heavy to very heavy rain lashed Karachi dropping 180mm in 24 hrs. Roads like Shahre Faisal were flooded badly.During the historically severe monsoon season of August 2022, parts of Karachi accumulated massive total monthly rainfall figures, with local areas receiving anywhere between 450 mm to over 1,000 mm cumulatively.

== September ==
The first three weeks of September can have some good rains. After the first three weeks, the monsoon completely withdraws from the city, and the sky remains sunny and dry. There is a slight decrease in humidity, which hovers between 70 and 80%, and an increase in temperatures. Rain in this month is inconsistent. During the monsoon of 2005 no rain occurred in the city raising the fears of drought but from 9 September till 11 September heavy rainfall lashed the city about 80 millimetres (3.1 in) rainfall was recorded. From 12 September evening till 13 September afternoon, 2011 a total of 140 millimetres (5.5 in) occurred in the city that caused urban flooding in almost all parts of the city. The highest rainfall for September was 315.7 millimetres (12.43 in) in 1959. The highest temperature was 42.2 °C (108.0 °F) on 30 September 1951 and the lowest temperature recorded was 18.2 °C (64.8 °F) on 23 September 1994.Karachi's September 2025 monsoon season concluded with a cumulative rainfall of 304.4 mm, driven by the remnants of Ex-Tropical Storm Nongfa and the post-monsoon system Shakhti. These dual weather systems pushed monthly totals significantly past the historical baseline, contributing to Sindh province recording rainfall averages 317% above normal.

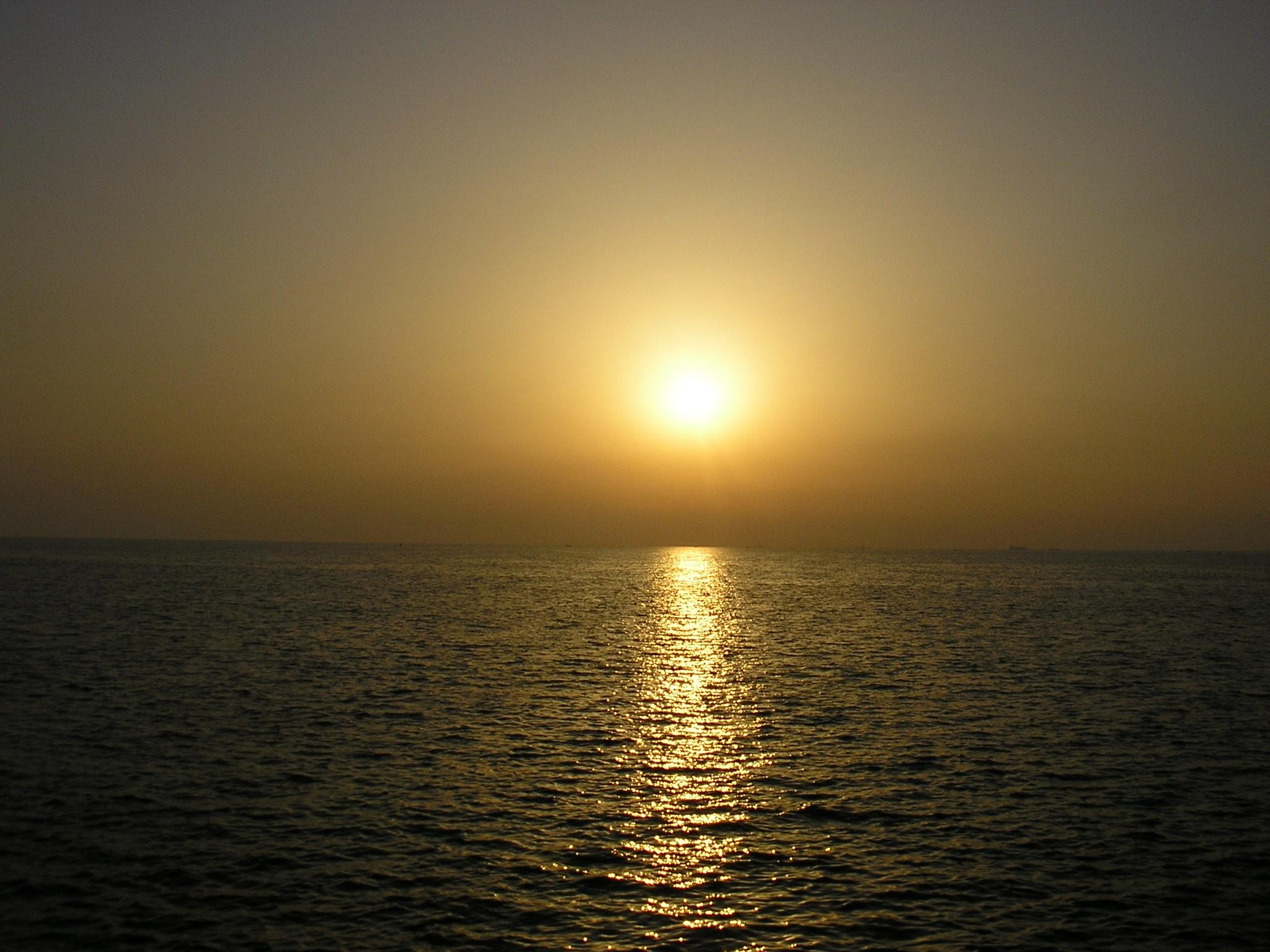
Sunset in Karachi

== October ==
October is the driest month in the city of Karachi. The highest temperature of 43.3 °C (109.9 °F) was recorded on 1 October 1959 and lowest was 10.0 °C (50.0 °F) recorded on 30 October 1949. Morning is hazy and the winds are calm, the sky remains clear with hot conditions. The highest monthly rainfall for October is 98mm, which occurred in 1956. It is the second hottest month of the year after May. Karachi is considered by some to be a city with two summers. Pre monsoon summer of April–May and post monsoon summer of Sep–Oct. During the year of 2004, the city received no significant precipitation, with the exception of a two-day spell of moderate rain which occurred between 2 and 3 October 2004, due to Cyclone Onil. 35 mm rain was recorded in two days across the city.

== November ==
November has hot days and pleasant nights. Mid-November conditions are much like those of October. During the last weeks of November there is a gradual decrease in temperature and thus winter begins, but it is not that cold. The first weeks of November are typically dry and the last week of November is cool. It is one of the driest months of the year, not only in Karachi, but most parts of Pakistan. On 9 November 2010 remnants of Cyclone Jal caused gusty winds in the metropolis. The highest rainfall for November is 83.1 millimetres (3.27 in), which occurred in 1959. The highest and lowest temperatures are 38.5 °C (101.3 °F), recorded on 1 November 1994 and 6.1 °C (43.0 °F), recorded on 29 November 1938 respectively.

== December ==
The month of December is the annual winter month. In December, the weather remains cool. The sky remains overcast for part of the month, causing temperatures to decrease. Rainfall is common in the city during the month of December due to the western disturbance coming from the Mediterranean Sea. The highest monthly rainfall of 63.6 millimetres (2.50 in) was recorded in 1980. During December 2006 a strong westerly "low" pressure resulted in 60.5 millimetres (2.38 in) of rain in the city. The highest recorded temperature for December was 34.5 °C (94.1 °F) on 11 December 2001 and the lowest temperature was 1.3 °C (34.3 °F), which occurred on 14 December 1988.

== Monsoon precipitation in Karachi ==
The average annual rainfall for Karachi is 309.6 millimetres (12.19 in) (1981–2022); the highest annual rainfall of 953.5 millimetres (37.54 in) was recorded in 2022. The highest rainfall in a single day was recorded on 27 August 2020 when rainfall of 223.5 millimetres (8.80 in) lashed the financial hub of Pk. Annual monsoon rains for Karachi amount to 237.5 millimetres (9.35 in). The city experienced above-normal monsoon rainfalls in 2003, 2006, 2007, 2009, 2010, 2011, 2017, 2019 , 2020 , 2022 , 2024 , and 2025 while in 2004 and 2005 the city received below-normal rainfall. In 2009 the country received 30% below normal rainfall with the exception of Sindh, including Karachi, which received above normal monsoon rains. Following is the annual monsoon rainfall for the last few years based on data from the Pakistan Meteorological Department.

Monsoon precipitation in Karachi Monsoon begins from June till September
Precipitation
Year	(mm)	(in)	References
2000	276.9 mm	10.9 inches	
2001	270.4 mm	11.01 inches	
2002	198.8 mm	6.84 inches	
2003	335.2 mm	13.20 inches	
2004	235 mm	1.38 inches	
2005	197.2 mm	6.17 inches	
2006	301.1 mm	11.85 inches	
2007	465.6 mm	18.33 inches	
2008	191.5 mm	6.60 inches	
2009	279.9 mm	11.02 inches	
2010	372.9 mm	14.68 inches	
2011	295 mm	11.61 inches	
2012	159.1 mm	6.26 inches	
2013	242.4 mm	9.79 inches	As of 8 August 2013
2020	484 mm	19.06 inches	

== Tropical cyclones and tropical storms ==
Though cyclones are rare in the Arabian sea which is a part of North Indian Ocean, cyclones that form in the Arabian sea may move in five possible tracks; towards Indian Gujrat, towards Badin/Tharparkar coast, towards Karachi/Thatta coast, towards Gwadar coast or towards Oman Coast. Cyclones in the Arabian sea form mostly from mid-May to mid-July and then in the month of October. Monsoon season plays a vital role for the formation of cyclones in this basin. Tropical storms that hit Pakistan are mostly remnants by the time they reach Pakistan or make landfall in south eastern Sindh, which is not very populated. They rarely move towards the Balochistan coast.

Due to "Climate Change", now the frequency of Tropical Cyclones formation in the Arabian Sea has been increased and hence threats of landfall towards Karachi has also been increased.

=== List of tropical cyclones in Pakistan ===
Each year before the onset of monsoon (15 May to 15 July) and also after its withdrawal (15 September to 15 November), there is always a distinct possibility of the cyclonic storm to develop in the north Arabian Sea. There is a 50 percent chance of cyclones to turn towards the Indian state of Gujarat, 20 percent chance of moving towards the Oman/Gulf and thirty percent chance of moving towards the Pakistani coast.

There is one tropical cyclone warning centre (TCWC) operational in Pakistan. It is in Karachi, as in operated by the Pakistan Meteorological Department. It monitors different systems that emerge in the Arabian Sea, and issues appropriate advisories, alerts, and warnings. During the last 100 years, a number of cyclonic storms have struck Pakistan's coastal areas. The years involved were 1895, 1902, 1907, 1944, 1948, 1964, 1985, 1999, 2007 and 2010.

Wettest tropical cyclones/depressions in Pakistan Highest known recorded totals
Precipitation / Rainfall			Name of Tropical Cyclone / Storm	Measurement Station
Rank	(mm)	(in)	Name of Tropical Cyclone / Storm	Measurement Station
1	370 mm	14.57 inches	Phet (2010)	Gwadar
2	285 mm	11.22 inches	2A (1999)	Keti Bandar
3	245 mm	9.64 inches	BOB (2009)	Karachi
4	191 mm	7.51 inches	BOB 06 (2007)	Karachi
5	145 mm	5.71 inches	Onil (2004)	Thatta
6	110 mm	3.94 inches	Yemyin (2007)	Karachi
7	43 mm	1.69 inches	BOB 04 (2007)	Karachi
8	18 mm	0.70 inches	BOB 03 (2009)	Karachi

== See also ==
- 2009 Karachi floods
- Climate of Pakistan
- Climate of Sindh
- Demographics of Karachi
- History of Karachi
- List of extreme weather records in Pakistan
- List of most populous metropolitan areas in Pakistan
- Pakistan Meteorological Department
