= Climate of Sindh =

The province of Sindh is situated in a tropical region, with subtropical regions in the northern sections; it is hot, humid and very rainy in the summer and cold and dry in winter. Temperatures frequently rise above 46 °C (115 °F) between May and August, and the minimum average temperature of 2 °C (36 °F) occurs during December and January. The annual rainfall averages about nearly 13 inches (330 mm), falling mainly during June and September. The southwesterly monsoon wind begins to blow in mid-February and continues until the end of September, whereas the cool northerly wind blows during the winter months from October to January.

Sindh lies between the two monsoons — the southwest monsoon from the Indian Ocean and the northeast or retreating monsoon, deflected towards it by the Himalayan mountains — and escapes the influence of both. The average rainfall in Sindh is 11–14 in (28–36 cm) per year. The region's relative scarcity of rainfall is compensated by the inundation of the Indus twice a year, caused by the spring and summer melting of Himalayan snow and by rainfall in the monsoon season. These natural patterns have recently changed somewhat with the construction of dams and barrages on the Indus River. Parts of southeastern Sindh receive rainfall of up to 36 in (91 cm) and some cities have received very heavy rainfall on occasion. In 2005, Hyderabad received 14.4 in (37 cm) in just 11 hours. In Padidan a record rainfall of 1,722 millimeters was recorded in the monsoon season of 2022 which was also part of the massive 2022 Pakistan floods and appears on the List of extreme weather records in Pakistan.

Sindh is divided into three climatic regions: Siro (the upper region, centred on Jacobabad), Wicholo (the middle region, centred on Hyderabad), and Lar (the lower region, centred on Karachi).

The thermal equator passes through upper Sindh, where the air is generally very dry. The highest temperature ever recorded in Sindh was 53.7 °C (128.7 °F), which was recorded in Mohenjo-daro on 26 May 2010. It was not only the hottest temperature ever recorded in Pakistan but also the hottest reliably measured temperature ever recorded in the continent of Asia and the fourth highest temperature ever recorded on earth. The previous record for Sindh and Pakistan, and for all of Asia, had been 52.8 °C (127.0 °F), reached on 12 June 1919.

In the winters, frost is common. Central Sindh's temperatures are generally lower than those of upper Sindh but higher than those of lower Sindh. Dry hot days and cool nights are typical during the summer. Central Sindh's maximum temperature typically reaches 43–44 °C (109–111 °F). Lower Sindh has a damper and humid maritime climate affected by the southwestern winds in summer and northeastern winds in winter, with lower rainfall than Central Sindh. Lower Sindh's maximum temperature reaches about 35–38 °C (95–100 °F). In the Kirthar range at 1,800 m (5,900 ft) and higher at Gorakh Hill and other peaks in Dadu District, temperatures near freezing have been recorded and brief snowfall is received in the winters. In Gorakh temperatures in winter nights can sour down to -15.

The highest temperatures each year in Pakistan, typically rising to above 48 °C (118 °F), are usually recorded in Shaheed Benazeerabad District (previously called Nawabshah District) and Sibbi from May to August. Sometimes the temperature falls to 0 °C (32 °F); on rare occasions (once every 25 years or so) it has fallen to below −7 °C (19 °F) in December or January.

Summer(May–September)is extremely hot in the upper parts while it is hot in the central parts and mild near the coast.The Monsoon season also occurs in the summer from late june till late september. Winters(Late November-Early March) are cool and foggy in the upper parts while they get milder the near you go to the coast. Spring(Mid March-Late April) is short but can cause some rainfall because of western depressions. Autumn(October-Mid November) is the shortest season and is completely dry with almost no rainfall.

== Weather change ==
=== Monsoon ===
The monsoon season occurs in Sindh from late June to September. While days are hot and nights are cool in the start to mid of September and it's called "Thadhri" locally in Sindhi culture. Thadhri (the cool festival) is celebrated in the month of Savan (monsoon probably in late August and early September) every year on the seventh day of the waning of the moon. Thadhri festival is celebrated as joy for the end of summer season. In the Thadhri season Sindh receive air from all four sides, i.e. north, south, east and west and it's called Chumasi Hawa.

=== Rainfall ===
Sindh receives about 13 inches (~350mm) of rain annually, mostly the rainfall occurs in June and September. However, in the last 20 years, rainfall has increased and is projected to reach an average of above 500mm by the end of the century.

=== Tropical storms ===
Tropical storms usually form in Sindh from late April to June and again from late September to November.

== Awareness Against Climate Change by Sindhis ==
=== Lahooti Melo ===
Every year, Lahot and his team bring forth the Lahooti Melo in Sindh. In every year, Lahooti Team arranges various themes. A climate change awareness theme was organized by Lahooti Melo in 2020. Different sessions and panel discussions were held on the stage according to the theme.Lahooti Melo 5 gearing up to talk about climate changeLahooti Melo 2020 to talk about climate change

=== Sindh Literature Festival ===
Sindh Literature Festival is first and largest literary festival organised by Naseer Gopang and Zohaib Kaka. The SLF event is a celebration of the potency of language, cultural diversity, music, and the values of harmony and acceptance. Its goal is to showcase the dynamic and lively cultures and customs of Sindh, which present an array of experiences unique to the region. Moreover, the event seeks to create a platform where both established and budding writers can interact with their followers and attract new admirers. Over the course of three days, the event is dedicated to commemorating the literary and cultural heritage of the province.

In 2023, Sindh Literature Festival team has announced its theme regarding Climate Change under the name of "Aalam Sabh Aabad Kareen". That name is captured from Shah Abdul Latif Bhittai Poetry.

== See also ==
- Climate of Karachi
- Sindh Literature Festival
- Climate of Pakistan
- Climate of Hyderabad
- Climate of Nawabshah
- List of extreme weather records in Pakistan
