= Western disturbance =

Extratropical storm over north India

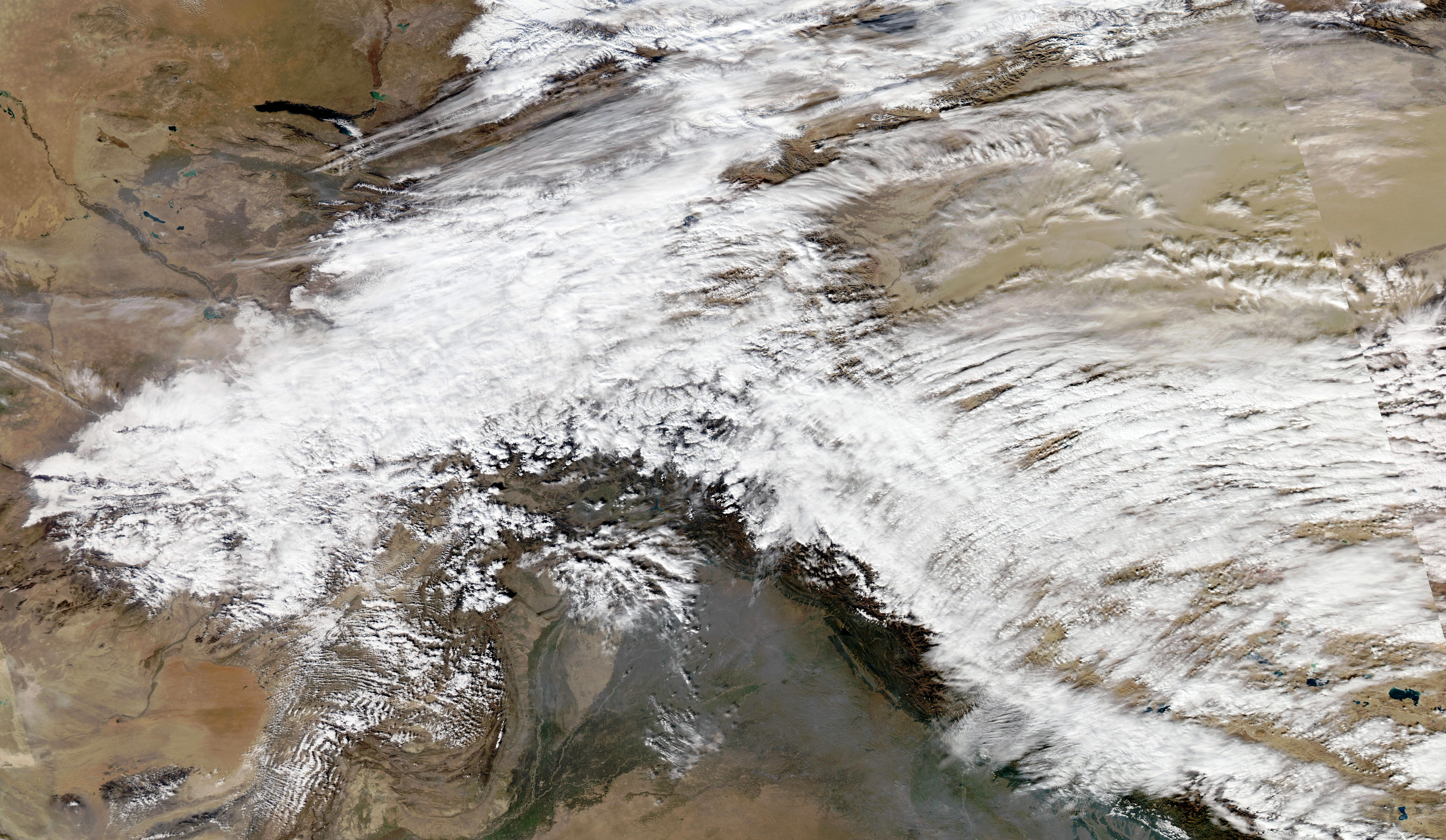
A Western Disturbance over Northern India and Pakistan in November 2012

A western disturbance is an extratropical storm originating in the Mediterranean region that brings sudden winter rain to the northwestern parts of the Indian subcontinent, which extends as east as up to northern parts of Bangladesh and southeastern Nepal. It is a non-monsoonal precipitation pattern driven by the westerlies. The moisture in these storms usually originates over the Mediterranean Sea, the Caspian Sea and the Black Sea. Extratropical storms are a global phenomenon with moisture usually carried in the upper atmosphere, unlike their tropical counterparts where the moisture is carried in the lower atmosphere. In the case of the Indian subcontinent, moisture is sometimes shed as rain when the storm system encounters the Himalayas. Western disturbances are more frequent and stronger in the winter season.

Western disturbances are important for the development of the Rabi crop, which includes the locally important staple wheat.

== Formation ==
Western disturbances originate in the Mediterranean region in Mediterranean sea. A high-pressure area over Ukraine and neighbourhood consolidates, causing the intrusion of cold air from polar regions towards an area of relatively warmer air with high moisture. This generates favorable conditions for cyclogenesis in the upper atmosphere, which promotes the formation of an eastward-moving extratropical depression. Traveling at speeds up to 12 m/s (43 km/h; 27 mph), the disturbance moves towards the Indian subcontinent until the Himalayas inhibits its development, upon which the depression rapidly weakens. The western disturbances are embedded in the mid-latitude subtropical westerly jet stream.

A western disturbance moving east towards the Indian subcontinent. It can be seen as a cloud patch originating from the Black Sea, progressing east thereafter.

== Significance and impact ==
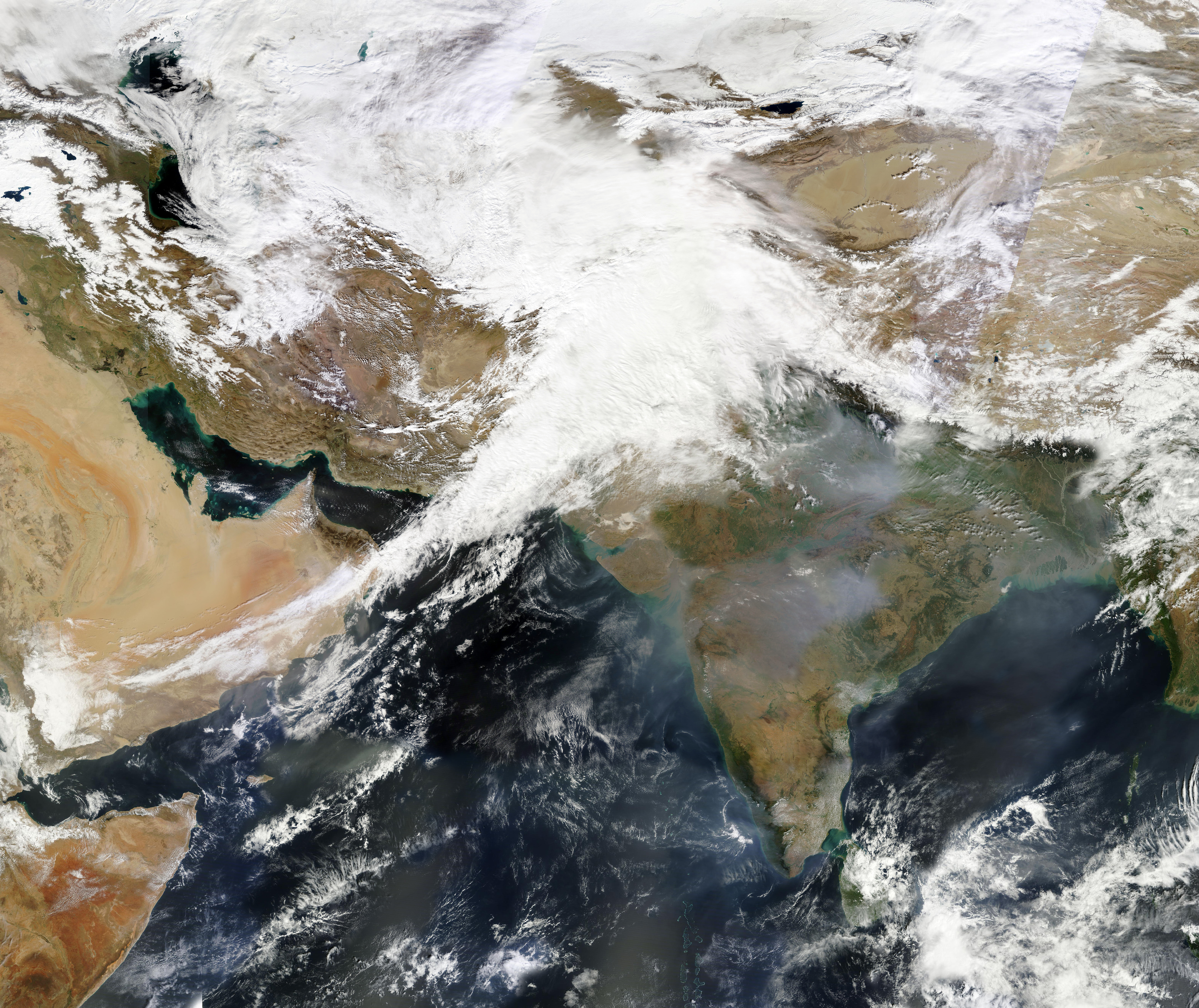
A strong western disturbance affecting the northern parts of the Indian subcontinent in February 2013. Such disturbances bring substantial amount of rainfall and are a threat to lives and property.

Western disturbances, specifically the ones in winter, bring moderate to heavy rain in low-lying areas and heavy snow to mountainous areas of the Indian Subcontinent. They are the cause of most winter and post-monsoon season rainfall across Pakistan and northwest India. Precipitation during the winter season has great importance in agriculture, particularly for the rabi crops. Wheat among them is one of the most important crops, which helps to meet India's food security. An average of four to five western disturbances form during the winter season. The rainfall distribution and amount varies with every western disturbance.

Western disturbances are usually associated with cloudy sky, higher night temperatures and unusual rain. Excessive precipitation due to western disturbances can cause crop damage, landslides, floods and avalanches. Over the Indo-Gangetic plains, they occasionally bring cold wave conditions and dense fog. These conditions remain stable until disturbed by another western disturbance. When western disturbances move across northwest India before the onset of monsoon, a temporary advancement of monsoon current appears over the region.

The strongest western disturbances usually occur in the western and northern parts of Pakistan, where flooding is reported number of times during the winter season.

== Effects on monsoon ==
Western disturbances start declining in numbers after winter. During the summer months of April and May, they move across north India. The southwest monsoon current generally progresses from east to west in the northern Himalayan region, unlike western disturbances which follow a west to east trend in north India with consequent rise in pressure carrying cold pool of air. This helps in the activation of monsoon in Afghanistan and certain parts of northwest India. It also causes pre-monsoon rainfall especially in northern India.

The interaction of the monsoon trough with western disturbances may occasionally cause dense clouding and heavy precipitation. The 2013 North India floods, which killed more than 5000 people in a span of 3 days, is said to be a result of one such interaction.

== See also ==
- Tropical cyclones
- Maruts
