= Pikedale, Queensland =

Pikedale
- Suburb
- Interactive map of Pikedale
- Coordinates: 28.6388°S 151.6502°E
- Country: Australia
- State: Queensland
- LGA: Southern Downs Region
- Location: 33.3 km (20.7 mi) W of Stanthorpe; 92.9 km (57.7 mi) SW of Warwick; 156 km (97 mi) SSW of Toowoomba; 252 km (157 mi) SW of Brisbane
- Established: 1845

Government
  - State electorate: Southern Downs
  - Federal division: Maranoa

Area
  - Total: 299.6 km^{2} (115.7 sq mi)

Population
  - Total: 24 (2021 census)
  - Density: 0.0801/km^{2} (0.207/sq mi)
- Time zone: UTC+10:00 (AEST)
- Postcode: 4380
Suburbs around Pikedale
Terrica	Goldfields	Amiens
Warroo	Pikedale	Greenlands
Pikes Creek	Springdale	Nundubbermere

Pikedale is a rural locality in the Southern Downs Region, Queensland, Australia. It is one of the areas used for soldier settlements following service in World War I. In the 2021 census, Pikedale had a population of 24 people.

== Geography ==
Pike Creek enters the locality from the north (Goldfields) and flows south through the locality and exits to the south-west (the locality of Pikes Creek); it is ultimately a tributary of the Dumaresq River.

The Stanthorpe – Texas Road (known locally as the Texas Road) passes through the locality from the east (Greenlands) to the south-west (Pikes Creek). It has a junction with the Stanthorpe Inglewood Road which exits the locality to the north west.

The land use is grazing on native vegetation.

== History ==
The locality takes its name from a pastoral station named by John Pike in 1845.

=== Pikedale station ===
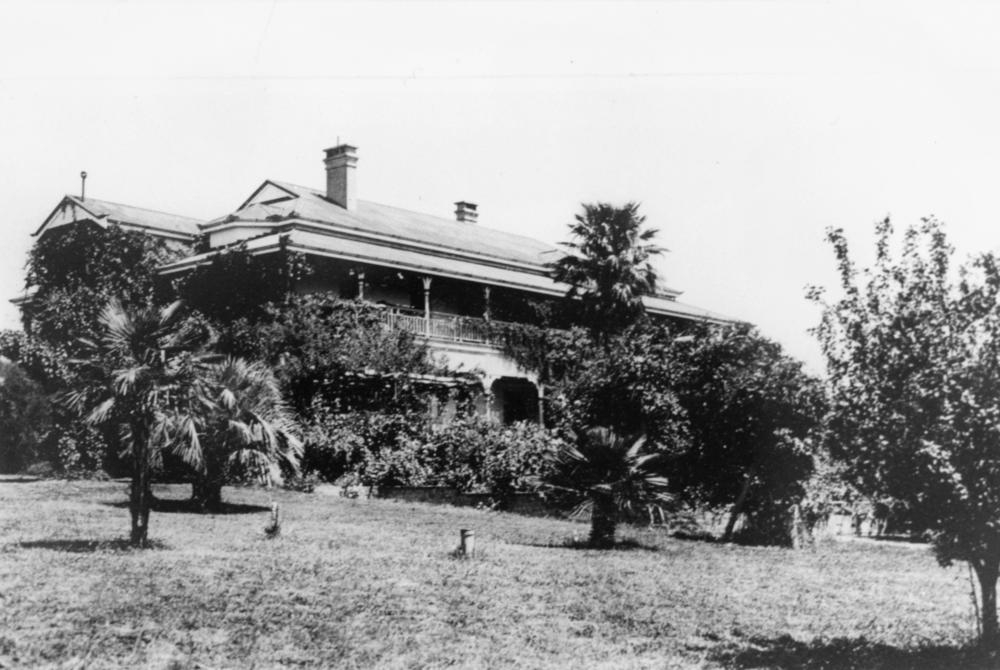
Pikedale Homestead

The Pikedale station was established by John in 1843 as a sheep station. In 1859 it was sold to W.B. Tooth and Cran who used it as a cattle station, selling it to Massie and Walker. In 1874 Donald Gunn purchased the property and established a sheep stud, which became famous for its wool quality, leading to the export of rams to the United States. Fred White and his son Charlie White operated the station until they sold it to James A. Rogerson in 1919. The Rogerson family owned the property until 1957. H. Vahl Rubin purchased the property in 1957. The homestead (then a 53-room mansion) burned down on Sunday 3 August 1963.

In March 1942 during World War II fearing a Japanese invasion, St Hilda's School evacuated 90 boarders from Southport to the Pikedale homestead. The school returned to Southport in December 1942.

=== Land selection ===
Land in Pikedale was open for selection on 17 April 1877; 27 square miles (70 km^{2}) were available.

=== Pikedale soldier settlement ===
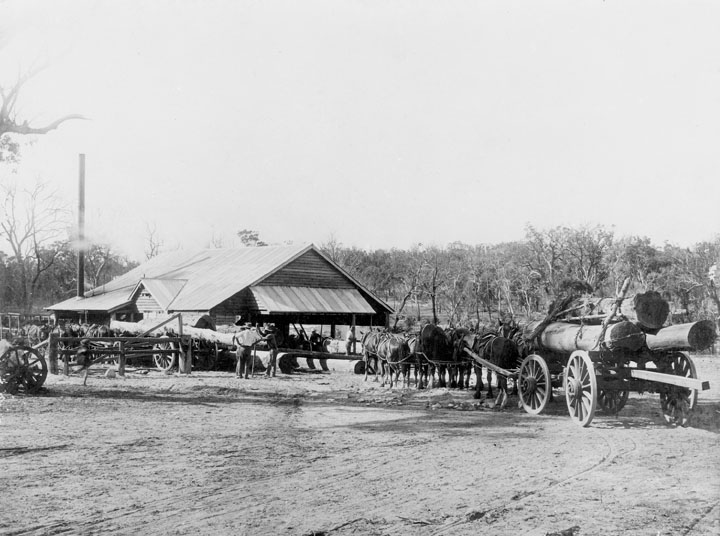
State Sawmill, Pikedale, 1920

Under the Discharged soldiers’ settlement Act, 1917 and associated legislation and regulations, every discharged member of the armed forces was entitled to apply for land and financial assistance. The important goals within this initiative were to open up new land for settlement as well as place willing and suitable settlers on this land. At the same time, it aimed to provide employment as well as the necessary support for the many discharged servicemen who had served their country.

The Stanthorpe Shire was one such area selected for settlement and around 17,000 acres was set aside in the parishes of Pikedale and Marsh. Eventually, more than seven hundred returned soldiers were allocated blocks in what became known as the Pikedale Soldier Settlement. Within this wider settlement, a number of locations were named by those returning servicemen in honour of famous battlefields, no doubt including some where they had fought. Eventually supported by a branch railway line, they included the settlements of Amiens, Messines, Bapaume, Passchendaele, Bullecourt, Pozieres and Fleurbaix. This rail line, known as the Amiens railway line, was opened in June 1920, with construction costing around £40,000 and operated for some 54 years. The official opening was performed by Edward, Prince of Wales who was visiting Australia at the time.

As with other soldier settlements, life was difficult due to the varying quality of the land, isolation, lack of farming or other agricultural experience, adverse climatic conditions and the general lack of financial and other government support. However, the branch railway line helped in terms of access and a number of Queensland Government enterprises were established.

=== Schools ===
Pikedale Road Provisional School opened circa 1876 and closed circa 1887. In September 1883, the name of the Pikedale-Road school-house Post Office, which had been established in 1880, was changed to Mountside Post Office.

Pikedale No 1 Provisional School and Pikedale No 2 Provisional School opened circa 1890 as half-time schools (meaning they shared a single teacher between them). Pikedale No 1 Provisional School closed in 1902 and Pikedale No 2 Provisional School became a full-time school renamed Pikedale Provisional School. In 1908, Pikedale No 1 Provisional School reopened and Pikedale Provisional School returned to the name Pikedale No 2 Provisional School and the two schools operated as half-time schools again. In 1915, Pikedale No 2 Provisional School closed and Pikedale No 1 Provisional School became a full-time school renamed Pikedale Provisional School. In 1919, Pikedale Provisional School became a half-time school again, this time in conjunction with Mallow Provisional School. In 1922, Mallow Provisional School closed and Pikedale Provisional School became a full-time school again. In 1925, Pikedale Provisional School closed.

Pikedale Soldier's Settlement State School opened on 10 March 1919. In 1920, it was renamed Amiens State School and is now within the locality of Amiens.

== Demographics ==
In the 2016 census, Pikedale had a population of 39 people.

In the 2021 census, Pikedale had a population of 24 people.

== Education ==
There are no schools in Pikedale. The nearest government primary schools are Greenlands State School in neighbouring Greenlands to the east and Amiens State School in neighbouring Amiens to the north-east. The nearest government secondary school is Stanthorpe State High School in Stanthorpe to the east. There is also a Catholic primary-and-secondary school in Stanthorpe.
