= The Summit, Queensland =

The Summit
- Town
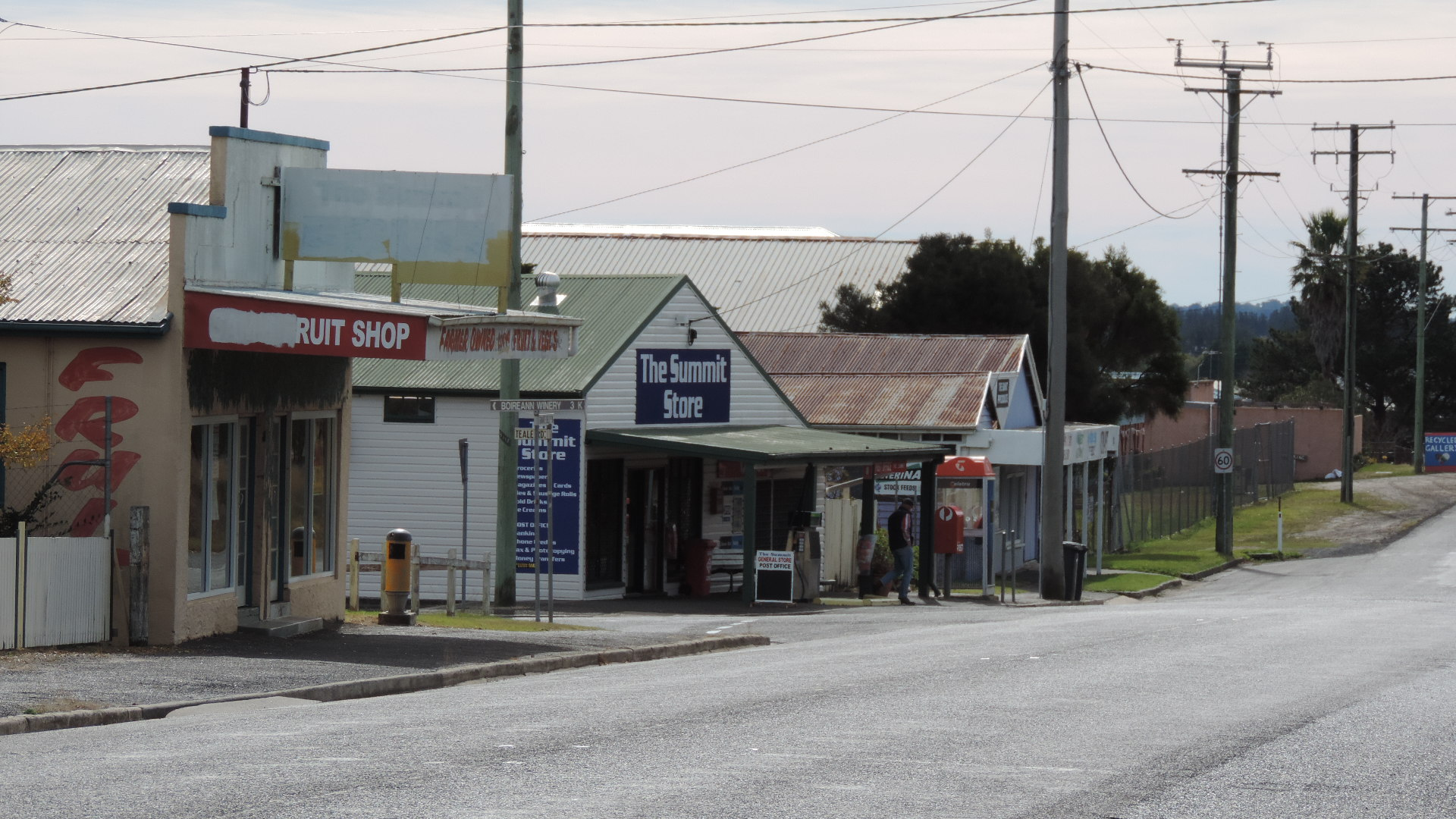
- Granite Belt Drive (main street), The Summit, 2015

- Interactive map of The Summit
- Coordinates: 28.5755°S 151.9508°E
- Country: Australia
- State: Queensland
- LGA: Southern Downs Region
- Location: 10.0 km (6.2 mi) NNE of Stanthorpe; 50.6 km (31.4 mi) SSE of Warwick; 134 km (83 mi) S of Toowoomba; 208 km (129 mi) SW of Brisbane

Government
  - State electorate: Southern Downs
  - Federal division: Maranoa

Area
  - Total: 16.5 km^{2} (6.4 sq mi)
- Elevation: 923.5 m (3,030 ft)

Population
  - Total: 436 (2021 census)
  - Density: 26.42/km^{2} (68.44/sq mi)
- Time zone: UTC+10:00 (AEST)
- Postcode: 4377
Localities around The Summit
Pozieres	Thulimbah	Maryland (NSW)
Pozieres	The Summit	Glen Niven
Cannon Creek	Applethorpe	Applethorpe

The Summit is a rural town and locality in the Southern Downs Region, Queensland, Australia. The locality borders New South Wales. In the 2021 census, the locality of The Summit had a population of 436 people.

== Geography ==
The Summit is predominantly farmland with some urban development surrounding the railway station. The New England Highway passes north-south through the town, running close to and parallel with the Southern railway line. Originally the highway was the main street of the town, but now the highway bypasses the town to the east. Cannon Creek forms the south-western border of the locality.

== History ==
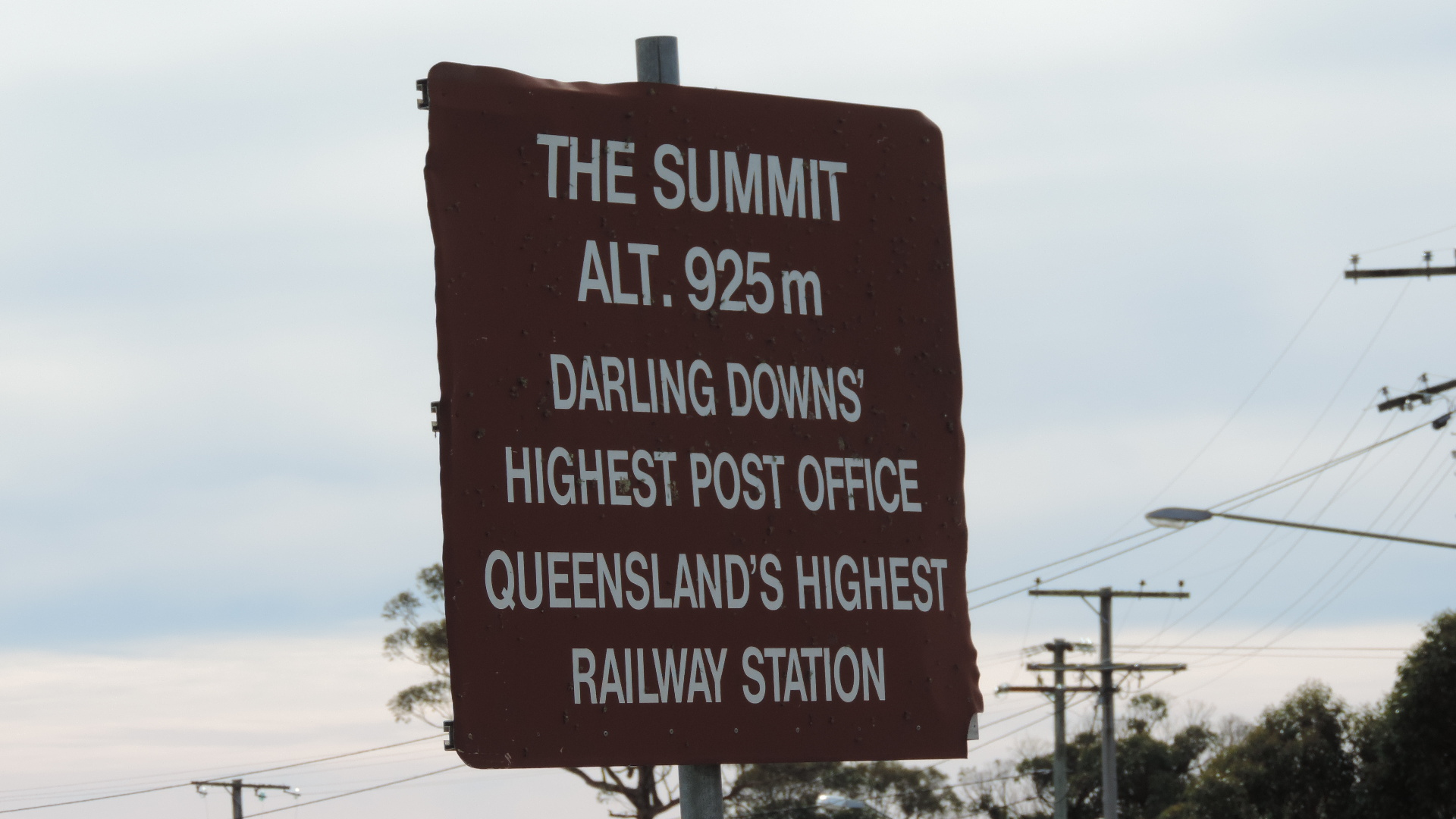
Information board, The Summit, 2015

The town takes its name from The Summit railway station, which was so named because it was the highest point (923.5 metres (3,030 ft)) on the Southern railway line from Warwick to Wallangarra.

The Summit State School opened on 29 August 1921.

The Summit Methodist Church opened on Wednesday 18 August 1915. Following the amalgamation of the Methodist Church into the Uniting Church in Australia in 1977, it became The Summit Uniting Church. It closed on 18 November 2017. It was at 9 Church Road (28.5773°S 151.9491°E). The church building is still extant, but has been converted into a house.

On Sunday 28 November 1926, St John's Anglican Church was officially opened and dedicated by Reverend Canon David Garland.

The Seventh-Day Adventist Church opened in 1989.

== Demographics ==
In the 2011 census, the locality of The Summit had a population of 484 people.

In the 2016 census, the locality of The Summit had a population of 409 people.

In the 2021 census, the locality of The Summit had a population of 436 people.

== Education ==
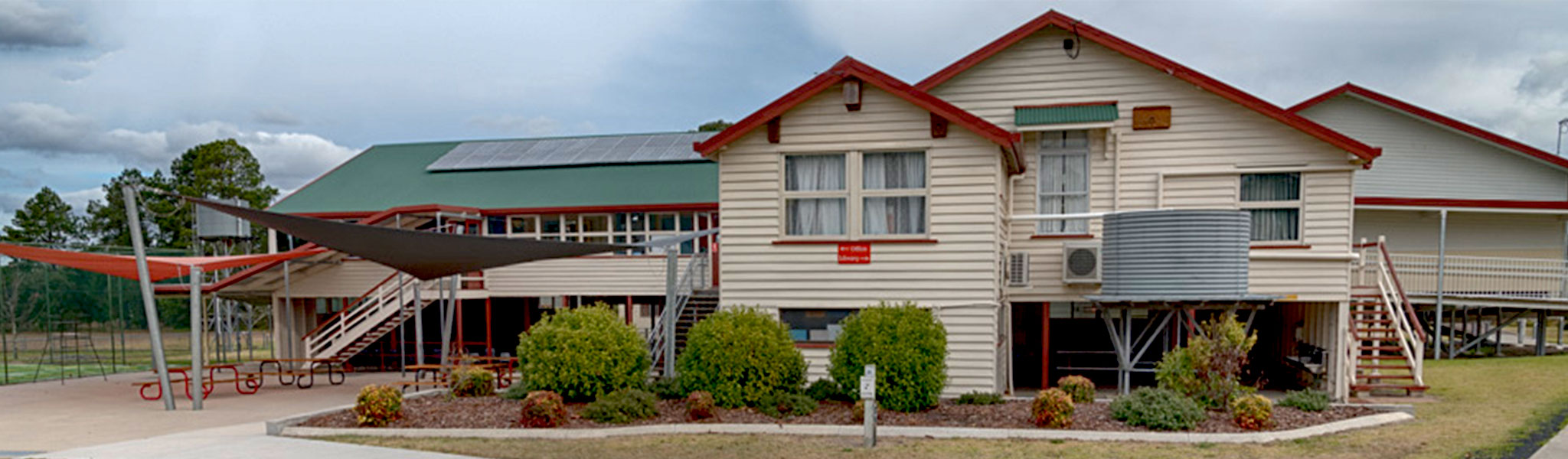
The Summit State School, 2021

The Summit State School is a government primary (Prep-6) school for boys and girls at 34 Taggart's Road (28.5790°S 151.9552°E). In 2018, the school had an enrolment of 31 students with 3 teachers (2 full-time equivalent) and 7 non-teaching staff (3 full-time equivalent).

There is no secondary school in The Summit. The nearest government secondary school is Stanthorpe State High School in Stanthorpe to the south.

== Amenities ==
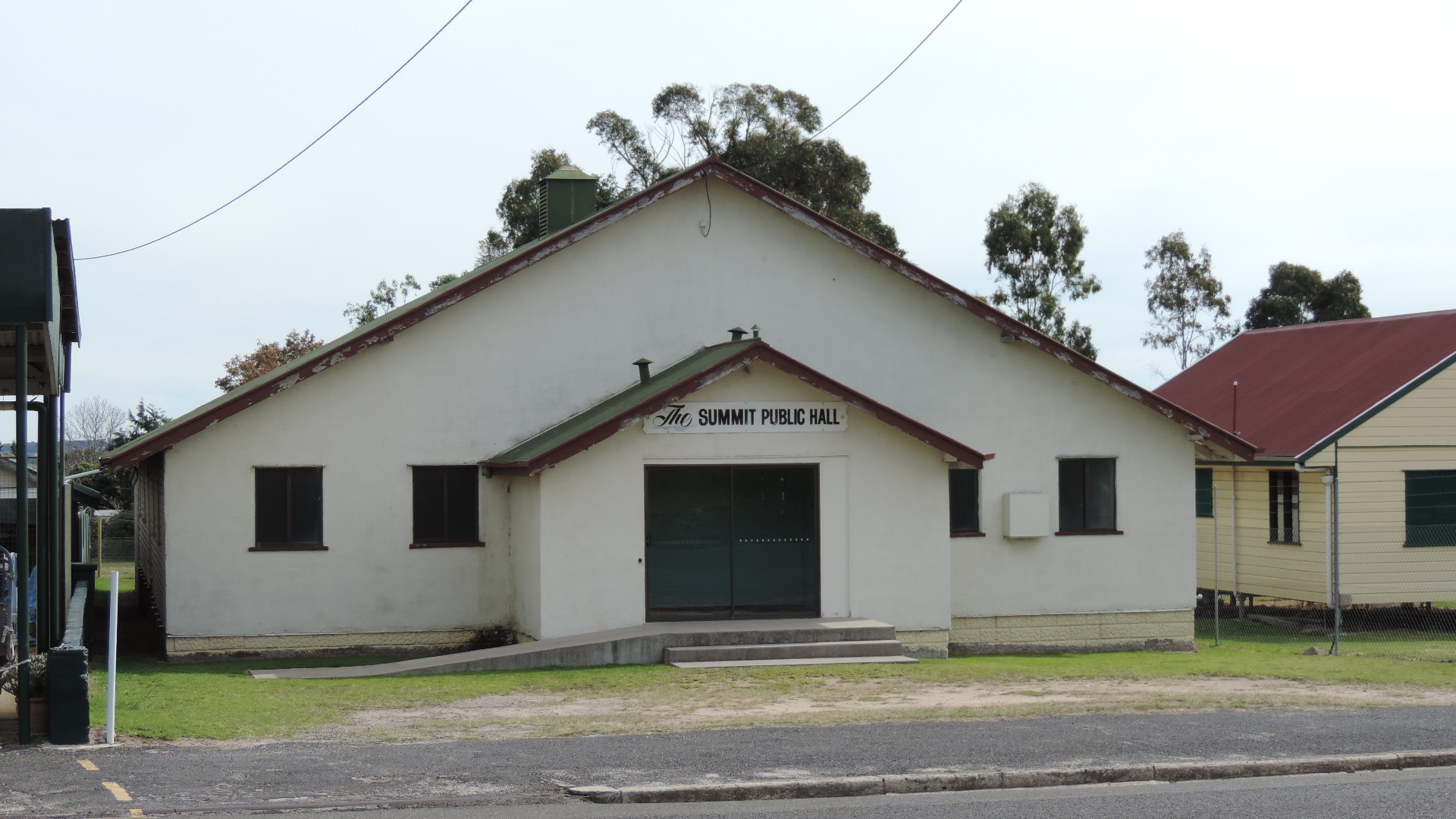
The Summit Public Hall, 2015

The Summit Public Hall is at 101 Granite Belt Drive (28.5745°S 151.9490°E) opposite the railway station.

St John's Anglican Church is at 7 Teale Road (28.5741°S 151.9484°E). It is part of the Stanthorpe Parish within the Anglican Diocese of Brisbane.

The Summit Seventh Day Adventist Church is at 25 Church Road (28.5773°S 151.9475°E).
