= SNH =

SNH may refer to:

- Scottish Natural Heritage
- Stanthorpe Airport, IATA airport code "SNH"
- Organotin hydrides R_{4−n}SnH_{n} in organotin chemistry
- SNH48
