= Glen Niven, Queensland =

Glen Niven
- Suburb
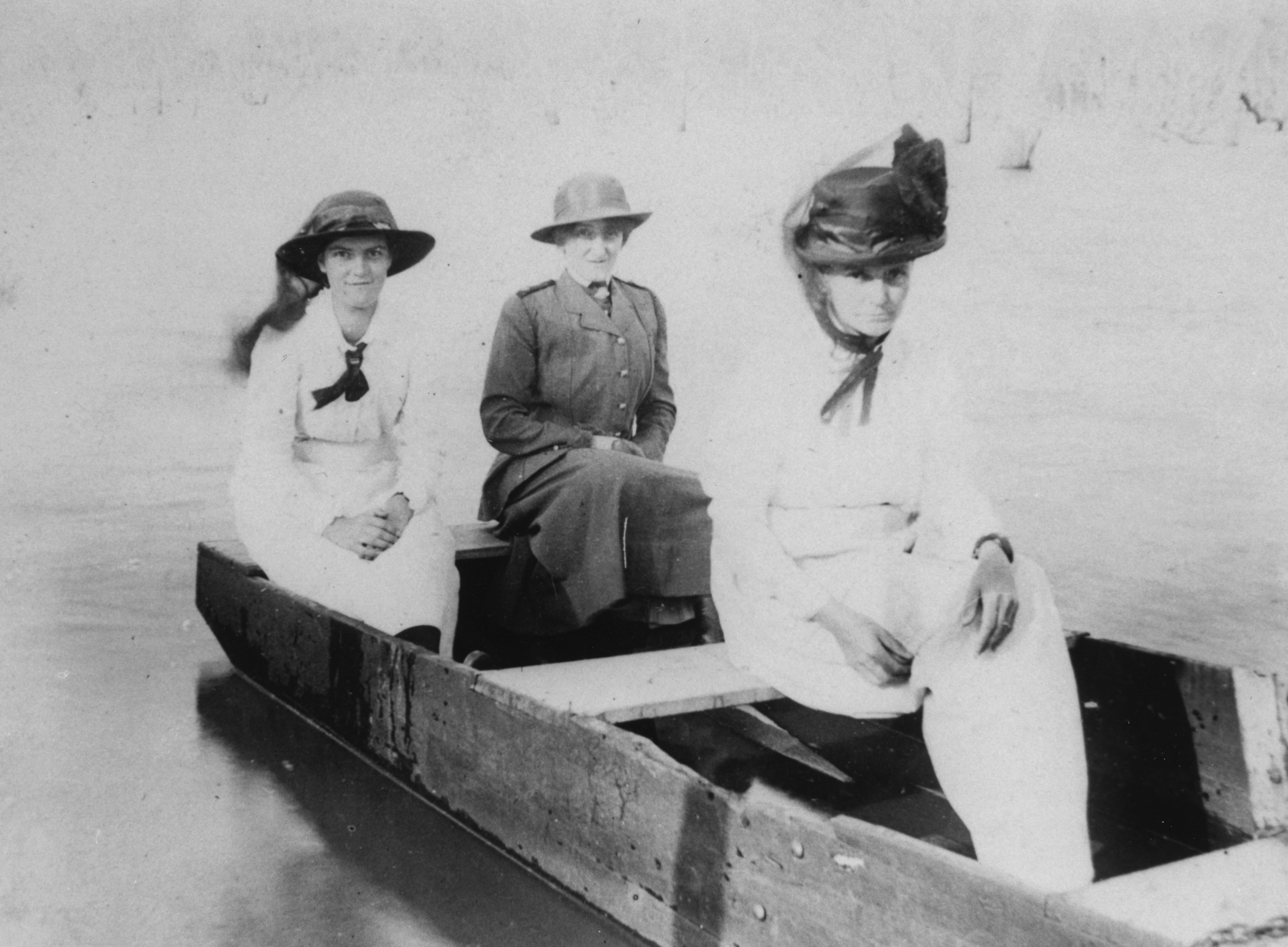
- Three ladies sitting in a boat on the lake at Glen Niven during World War I

- Interactive map of Glen Niven
- Coordinates: 28.5855°S 151.9725°E
- Country: Australia
- State: Queensland
- LGA: Southern Downs Region
- Location: 10.1 km (6.3 mi) NNE of Stanthorpe; 53.5 km (33.2 mi) SSW of Warwick; 136 km (85 mi) S of Toowoomba; 211 km (131 mi) SW of Brisbane

Government
  - State electorate: Southern Downs
  - Federal division: Maranoa

Area
  - Total: 8.5 km^{2} (3.3 sq mi)

Population
  - Total: 99 (2021 census)
  - Density: 11.65/km^{2} (30.2/sq mi)
- Time zone: UTC+10:00 (AEST)
- Postcode: 4377
Suburbs around Glen Niven
The Summit	Maryland (NSW)	Maryland (NSW)
The Summit	Glen Niven	Maryland (NSW)
Applethorpe	Applethorpe	Ruby Creek (NSW)

Glen Niven is a rural locality in the Southern Downs Region, Queensland, Australia. It is within the Granite Belt on the Darling Downs and adjacent to the border with New South Wales. In the 2021 census, Glen Niven had a population of 99 people.

== Geography ==
The locality is within the Granite Belt on the Darling Downs. The South Western railway line forms the western boundary of the locality while the Great Dividing Range (which is also the border with New South Wales) forms the eastern boundary.

There is a lake created by impounding Four Mile Creek; it is known as the Glen Niven Dam. It has a 9-metre (30 ft) high dam wall which is capable of holding 180 megalitres (6.4×10^{6} cu ft) of water. It supplies water to the Southern Downs Region.

The land use is predominantly grazing on native vegetation with some crop growing and rural residential housing.

== History ==
Glen Niven Dam was built in 1915. It's owned by the Queensland government and is managed by Technical Services on behalf of the Department of Resources. Upgrades to increase spillway capacity, safety and fulfil other legislative requirements were completed in April 2019.

The locality was officially named and bounded on 15 December 2000. It presumably takes its name from the now-abandoned Glen Niven railway station (28.5941°S 151.9653°E), which was named after Laurence Niven, who was a manager at one of the tin mines in the area.

== Demographics ==
In the 2016 census, Glen Niven had a population of 80 people.

In the 2021 census, Glen Niven had a population of 99 people.

== Education ==
There are no schools in Glen Niven. The nearest government primary schools are The Summit State School in neighbouring The Summit to the west and Applethorpe State School in neighbouring Applethorpe to the south. The nearest government secondary school is Stanthorpe State High School in Stanthorpe to the south-west.
