= Goldfields, Queensland =

Goldfields
- Suburb
- Interactive map of Goldfields
- Coordinates: 28.4769°S 151.7052°E
- Country: Australia
- State: Queensland
- LGA: Southern Downs Region
- Location: 23.1 km (14.4 mi) NW of Stanthorpe; 72.8 km (45.2 mi) SSW of Warwick; 156 km (97 mi) SSW of Toowoomba; 232 km (144 mi) SW of Brisbane

Government
  - State electorate: Southern Downs
  - Federal division: Maranoa

Area
  - Total: 218.8 km^{2} (84.5 sq mi)

Population
  - Total: 49 (2021 census)
  - Density: 0.2239/km^{2} (0.580/sq mi)
- Time zone: UTC+10:00 (AEST)
- Postcode: 4380
Suburbs around Goldfields
Cement Mills	Palgrave	Palgrave
Cement Mills	Goldfields	Passchendaele
Terrica	Pikedale	Amiens

Goldfields is a rural locality in the Southern Downs Region, Queensland, Australia. In the 2021 census, Goldfields had a population of 49 people.

== Geography ==
The terrain is undulating and predominantly used for grazing cattle. A small area in the north of the locality is part of the Durikai State Forest.

== History ==
The locality was named and bounded on 15 December 2000.

== Demographics ==
In the 2016 census, Goldfields had a population of 28 people.

In the 2021 census, Goldfields had a population of 49 people.

== Education ==
There are no schools in Goldfields. The nearest government primary school is Amiens State School in neighbouring Amiens to the south-east and Pozieres State School in Pozieres to the east. The nearest government secondary school is Stanthorpe State High School in Stanthorpe to the south-east.
