= Thomas Family Grave =

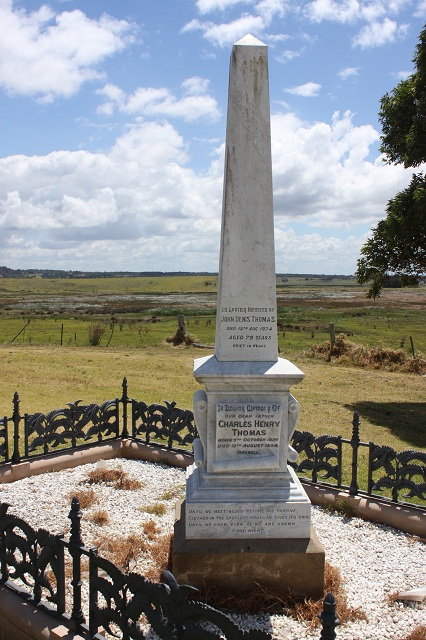

- Location within New South Wales
- 32.8678°S 151.6574°E
- Location: 79 Callan Avenue, Maryland, City of Newcastle, New South Wales, Australia

History
- Built: 1904
- Built for: Thomas family

Site notes
- Elevation: 9
- Owner: Newcastle City Council

New South Wales Heritage Register
- Official name: Thomas Family Grave
- Type: state heritage (built)
- Designated: 2 April 1999
- Reference no.: 00465
- Type: historic site

Thomas Family Grave is a heritage-listed grave at 79 Callan Avenue, Maryland, City of Newcastle, New South Wales, Australia. The property is owned by Newcastle City Council. It was added to the New South Wales State Heritage Register on 2 April 1999.

== Description ==
The grave is a burial marker of the Thomas family, early colonial settlers descended from John Thomas, who received the first land grant in the area in 1835.

It is a two-metre white marble obelisk with scrolls on a sandstone base, dated 1904. It is enclosed in a low cast-iron fence, surrounded by a wooden picket fence.

== Heritage listing ==
The Thomas Family Grave was listed on the New South Wales State Heritage Register on 2 April 1999.
