= Cannon Creek, Queensland (Southern Downs Region) =

Cannon Creek
- Suburb
- Interactive map of Cannon Creek
- Coordinates: 28.6080°S 151.8769°E
- Country: Australia
- State: Queensland
- LGA: Southern Downs Region
- Location: 10.5 km (6.5 mi) NW of Stanthorpe; 69.5 km (43.2 mi) SSW of Warwick; 153 km (95 mi) S of Toowoomba; 227 km (141 mi) SW of Brisbane

Government
  - State electorate: Southern Downs
  - Federal division: Maranoa

Area
  - Total: 10.9 km^{2} (4.2 sq mi)

Population
  - Total: 67 (2021 census)
  - Density: 6.15/km^{2} (15.92/sq mi)
- Time zone: UTC+10:00 (AEST)
- Postcode: 4380
Suburbs around Cannon Creek
Bapaume	Pozieres	The Summit
Amiens	Cannon Creek	Applethorpe
Broadwater	Applethorpe	Applethorpe

Cannon Creek is a rural locality in the Southern Downs Region, Queensland, Australia. In the 2021 census, Cannon Creek had a population of 67 people.

== History ==
Cannon Creek Provisional School opened on 6 January 1911. On 1 October 1913, it became Cannon Creek State School. It closed in 1945. It was located at 611 Cannon Creek Road (28.5847°S 151.8634°E), now within the locality of Bapaume.

== Demographics ==
In the 2016 census, Cannon Creek had a population of 39 people.

In the 2021 census, Cannon Creek had a population of 67 people.

== Education ==
There are no schools in Cannon Creek. The nearest government primary schools are Amiens State School in neighbouring Amiens to the west, Pozieres State School in neighbouring Pozieres to the north, and Stanthorpe State School in Stanthorpe to the south-east. The nearest government secondary school is Stanthorpe State High School, also in Stanthorpe.
