= Amiens, Queensland =

Amiens
- Suburb
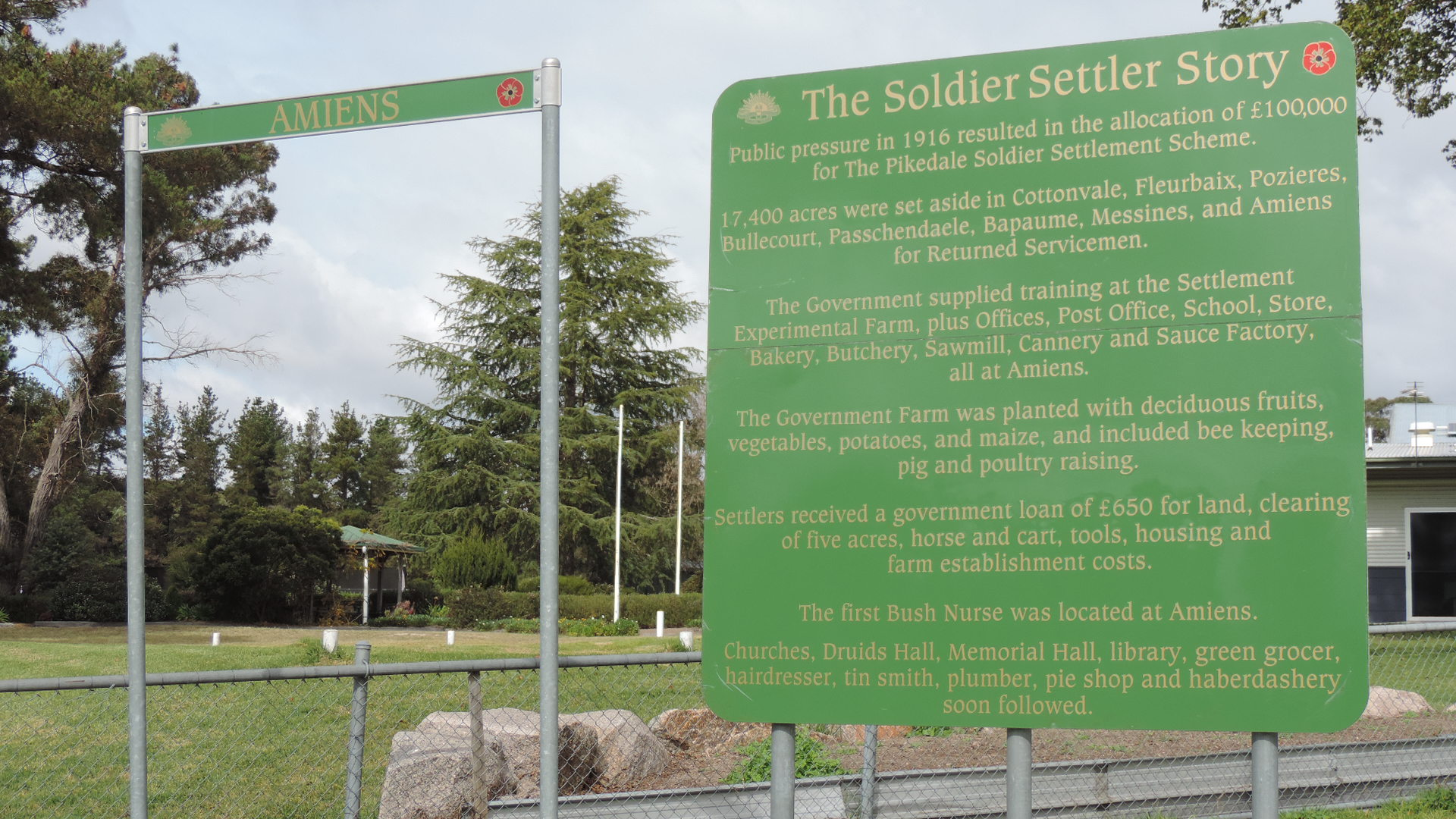
- Information board about the Pikedale soldier settlements, Amiens, 2015

- Interactive map of Amiens
- Coordinates: 28.5986°S 151.8163°E
- Country: Australia
- State: Queensland
- LGA: Southern Downs Region
- Location: 17.0 km (10.6 mi) NW of Stanthorpe; 67.7 km (42.1 mi) SW of Warwick; 150 km (93 mi) S of Toowoomba; 224 km (139 mi) SW of Brisbane

Government
  - State electorate: Southern Downs
  - Federal division: Maranoa

Area
  - Total: 51.9 km^{2} (20.0 sq mi)

Population
  - Total: 343 (2021 census)
  - Density: 6.609/km^{2} (17.12/sq mi)
- Time zone: UTC+10:00 (AEST)
- Postcode: 4380
Suburbs around Amiens
| Goldfields | Passchendaele | Bapaume |
| Pikedale | Amiens | Cannon Creek |
| Pikedale | Greenlands | Broadwater |

Amiens is a rural locality in the Southern Downs Region, Queensland, Australia. In the 2021 census, Amiens had a population of 343 people.

== Geography ==
Amiens Road commences in Stanthorpe to the south-east and enters the locality of Amiens from the south-east (Broadwater / Cannon Creek) and passes through the locality as its major route, before exiting to the north-east (Bapaume).

Most of the west of the locality is within the Passchendaele State Forest which extends into neighbouring Passchendaele to the north. Apart from this protected area, the land use is a mixture of rural residential housing, grazing on native vegetation, and crop growing (some of it irrigated).

== History ==
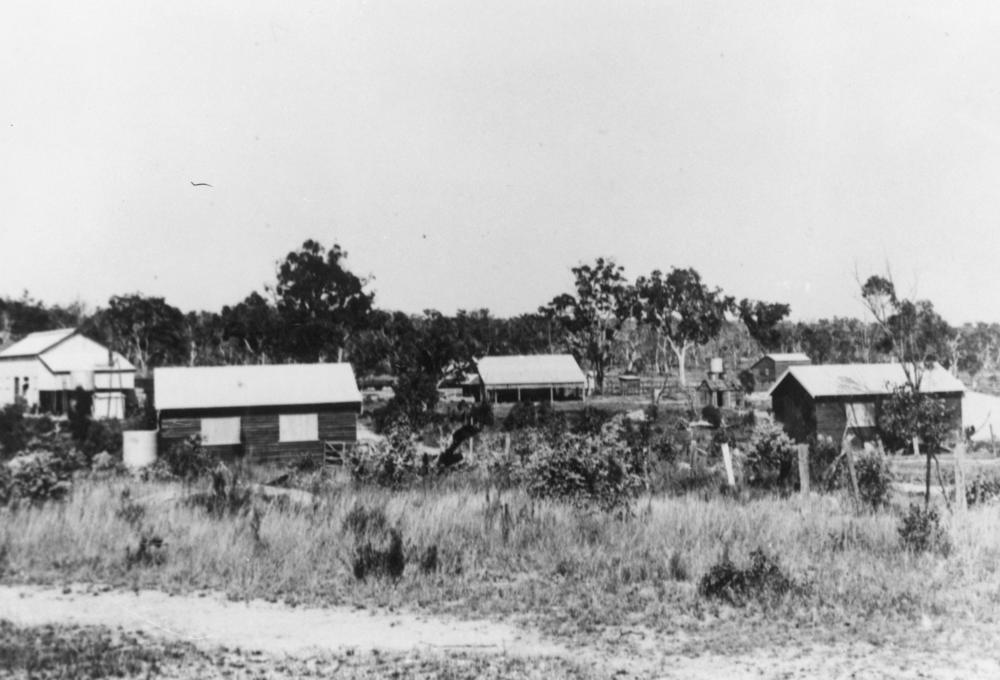
Amiens settlement, 1920

Following World War I, Amiens was one of the Pikedale soldier settlements established in the Granite Belt area of the Darling Downs.

The name Amiens refers to the World War I battlefield in northern France, of special importance to the Australian Imperial Force in March–April 1918. The name was suggested by surveyor George Grant in 1920.

Construction of the Amiens railway line commenced in 1919 and the line was opened on 7 June 1920 with the locality being served by the now-dismantled Amiens railway station (28.5866°S 151.8062°E). Edward, Prince of Wales travelled the length of the Amiens branch in a royal train to officially open the line on 26 July 1920.

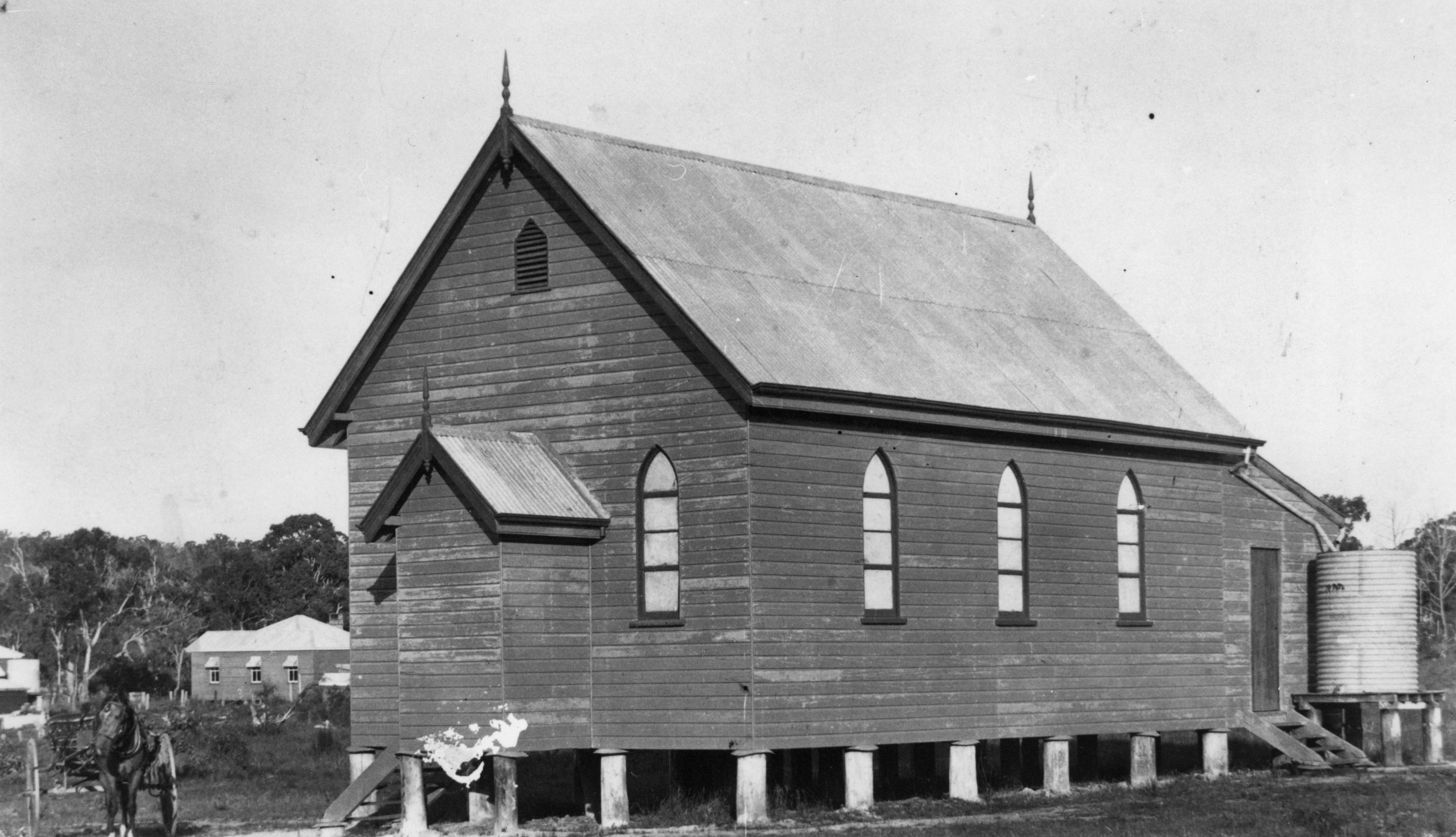
Methodist Church in Amiens, circa 1920

On Saturday 15 October 1921, a Methodist church was officially opened in Amiens by Reverend Edwin George Walker, of Stanthorpe. It had been relocated from Tannymorel (where it had been opened in 1902). In 1945, it was relocated to Severnlea, where it is now operates as the Severnlea Uniting Church.

Although the intention of the soldier settlement farms in the district was fruit growing, the fruit trees required a number of years before they would bear fruit and the government loans on the farms required immediate interest payments. Many soldier settlers turned to vegetable growing, both for their own use and to enable them to sell for a short-term income.

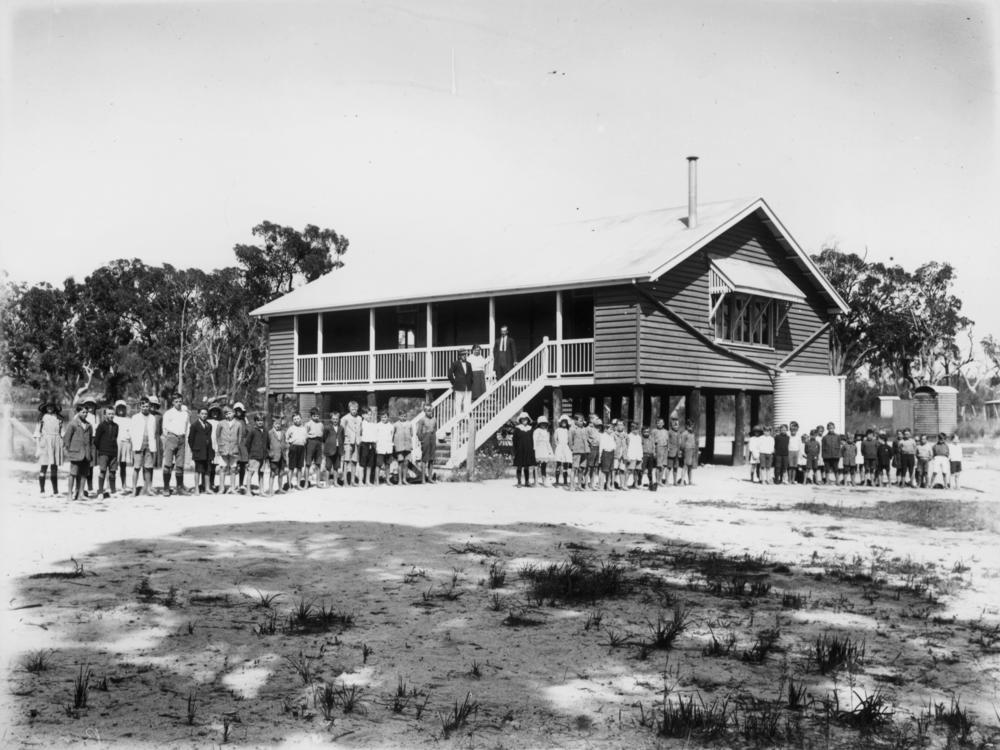
Amiens State School, 1922

Pikedale Soldier's Settlement State School opened on 10 March 1919. In 1920 it was renamed Amiens State School.

On Sunday 1 July 1923, St Denys' Anglican Church was officially opened by Canon David Garland. It was named after St Denys, a patron saint of France.

On Saturday 26 June 1926, the Amiens Memorial School of Arts and Hall was officially opened by Major Edward Costello, the Member of the Queensland Legislative Assembly for Carnarvon. It was used for the annual agricultural show as well as social events such as dances. It was located in Memorial Lane, but was relocated in the 1980s to Storm King Dam to be used as a recreation centre in the youth camp.

St Patrick's Catholic Church was established in 1964, having been relocated from Sugarloaf.

The railway line closed on 28 February 1974. Fruit and vegetables are carried by road to the markets.

== Demographics ==
In the 2016 census, Amiens had a population of 293 people.

In the 2021 census, Amiens had a population of 343 people.

== Heritage listings ==
Amiens has a number of heritage-listed sites, including:

- 17 Trevethan Lane: St Denys Anglican Church

== Economy ==
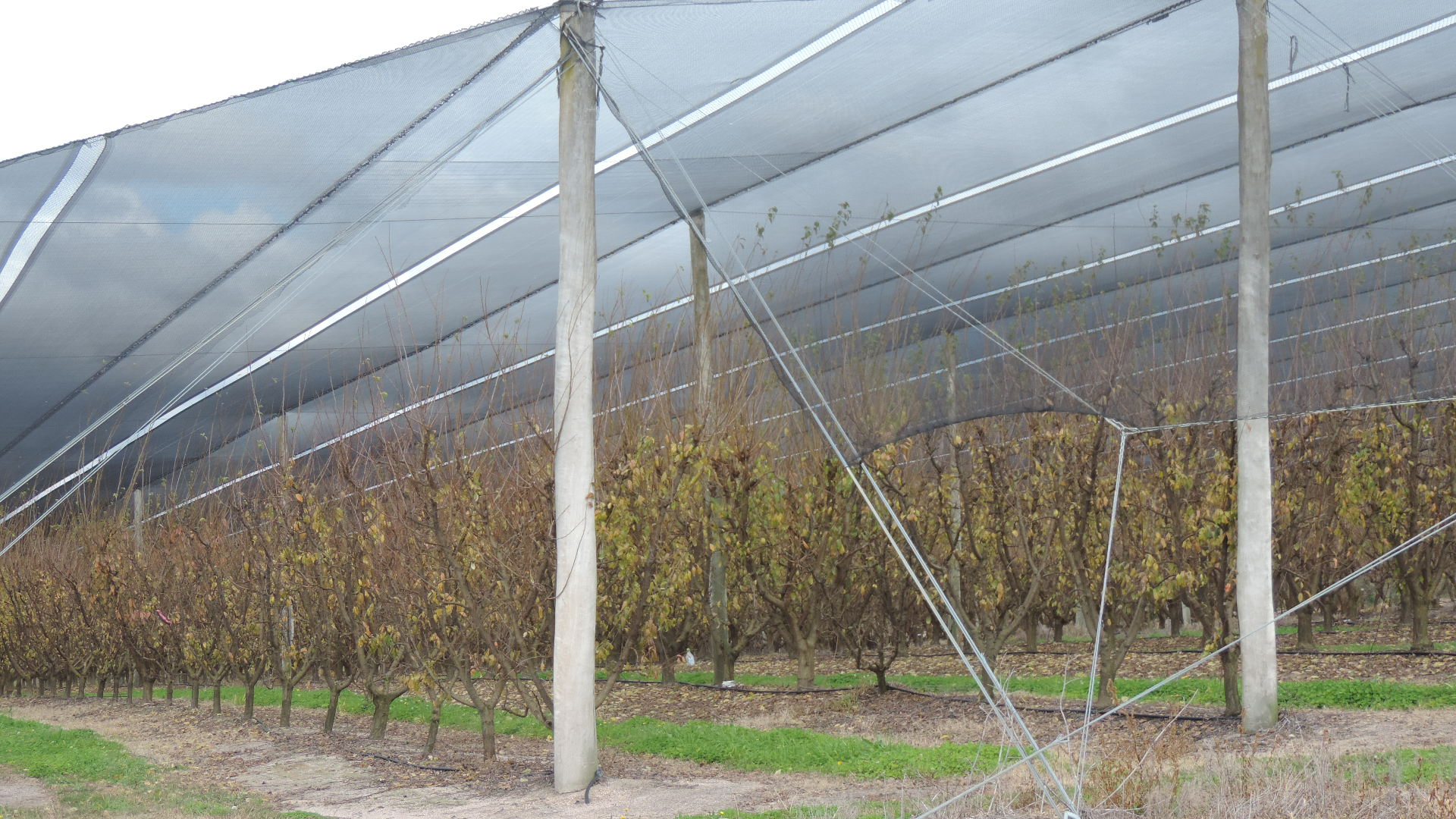
Apple trees under netting to protect them from hail, Amiens, 2015

Amiens is a fruit and vegetable growing district. As the Granite Belt suffers from regular hail, many orchards are protected by hail nets. Traditionally hail nets were intended to prevent the hail from entering the orchard; however, the heavy hail would pool in the nets and break through onto the orchard below. Modern hail nets are designed to have gullies between the rows of the trees which allow the hail to fall into the orchards but avoiding the fruit on the trees.

== Education ==
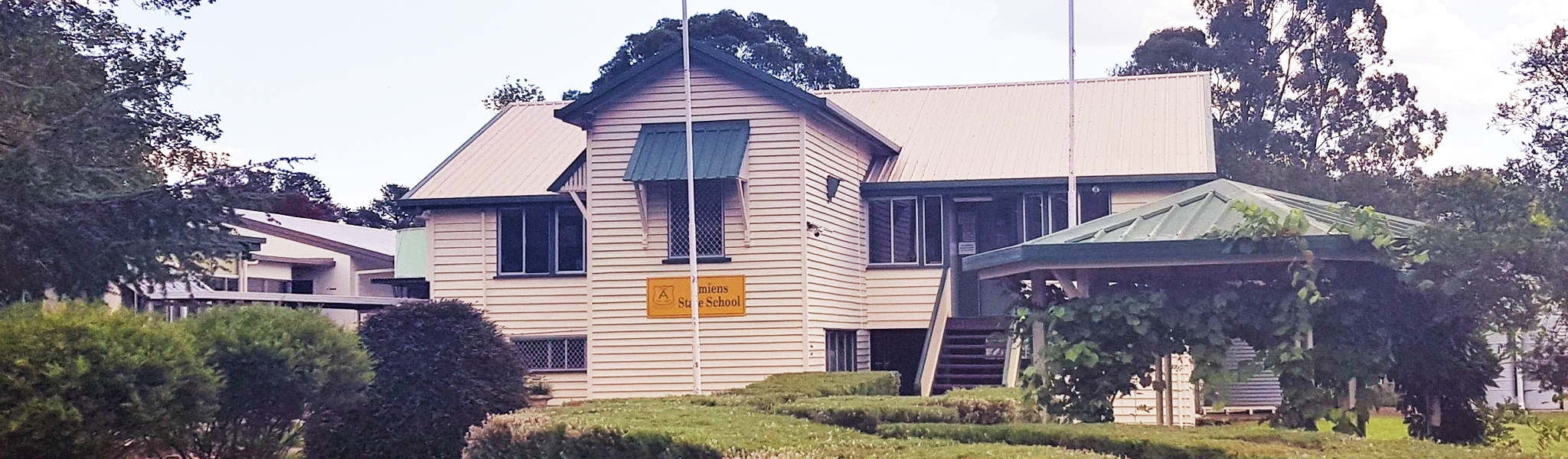
Amiens State School, 2023

Amiens State School is a government primary (Prep-6) school for boys and girls at 1337 Amiens Road (28.5945°S 151.8126°E). In 2018, the school had an enrolment of 39 students with 3 teachers and 6 non-teaching staff (3 full-time equivalent).

There are no secondary schools in Amiens. The nearest government secondary school is Stanthorpe State High School in Stanthorpe to the south-east.

== Amenities ==
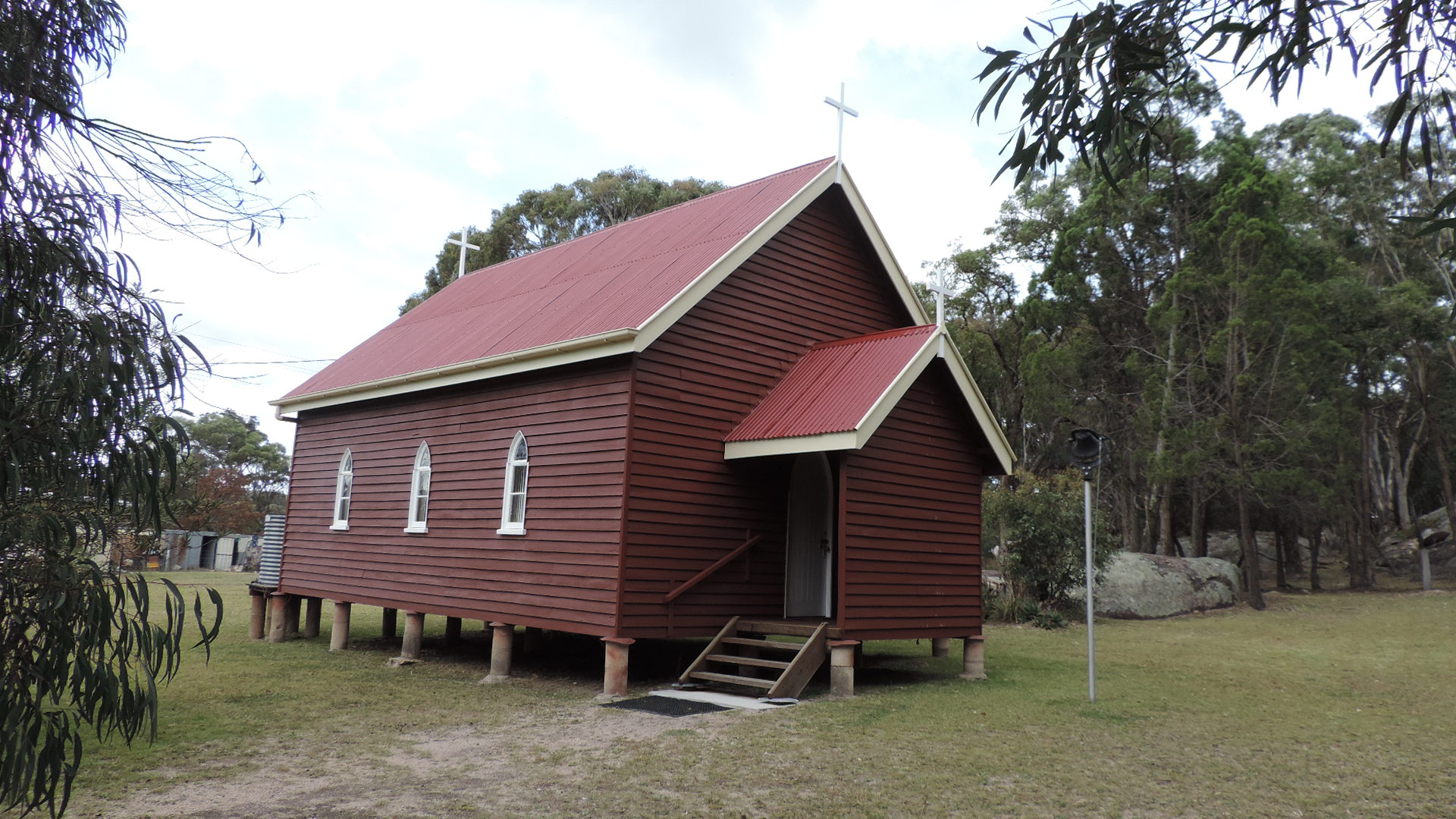
St Denys Anglican Church, Amiens, 2015

St Denys Anglican Church is at 17 Trevethan Lane (28.5906°S 151.8087°E). It is part of the Stanthorpe Parish within the Anglican Diocese of Brisbane.

St Patrick's Catholic Church is at 10 Goldfields Road (28.5860°S 151.8063°E).

== Attractions ==
The Amiens Legacy Centre is at 17 Goldfield Road (28.5865°S 151.8060°E). It is operated by the Amiens History Association. Tours are available.

The Robert Channon Winery hosts musical events in their Swigmore Hall.
