= Passchendaele, Queensland =

Passchendaele
- Suburb
- Interactive map of Passchendaele
- Coordinates: 28.5108°S 151.8436°E
- Country: Australia
- State: Queensland
- LGA: Southern Downs Region
- Location: 21.9 km (13.6 mi) NW of Stanthorpe; 67.5 km (41.9 mi) SW of Warwick; 150 km (93 mi) SSW of Toowoomba; 225 km (140 mi) SW of Brisbane

Government
  - State electorate: Southern Downs
  - Federal division: Maranoa

Area
  - Total: 72.0 km^{2} (27.8 sq mi)

Population
  - Total: 42 (2021 census)
  - Density: 0.583/km^{2} (1.511/sq mi)
- Time zone: UTC+10:00 (AEST)
- Postcode: 4380
Suburbs around Passchendaele
Goldfields	Palgrave	Dalveen
Goldfields	Passchendaele	Pozieres
Goldfields	Amiens	Bapaume

Passchendaele is a rural locality in the Southern Downs Region, Queensland, Australia. In the 2021 census, Passchendaele had a population of 42 people.

The undeveloped town of Messines is located within the locality (28.5667°S 151.8167°E).

Passchendaele's postcode is 4380.

== History ==
The locality takes its name from the former Passchendaele railway station on the Amiens railway line which served the soldier settlement fruit growing areas. It was named by the Queensland Railways Department in 1920, after the famous battleground in World War I.

Similarly, the town of Messines took its name from the Messines railway station on the Amiens line in the soldier settlement area. It was named after the village of Messines in West Flanders, about 15 kilometres south of Ypres, where Australian troops fought in the 1917 Battle of Messines.

== Demographics ==
In the 2016 census, Passchendaele had a population of 30 people.

In the 2021 census, Passchendaele had a population of 42 people.

== Education ==
There are no schools in Passchendaele. The nearest government primary schools are Pozieres State School in neighbouring Pozieres to the east and Amiens State School in neighbouring Amiens to the south. The nearest government secondary school is Stanthorpe State High School in Stanthorpe to the south-east.
