= Applethorpe, Queensland =

Applethorpe
- Town
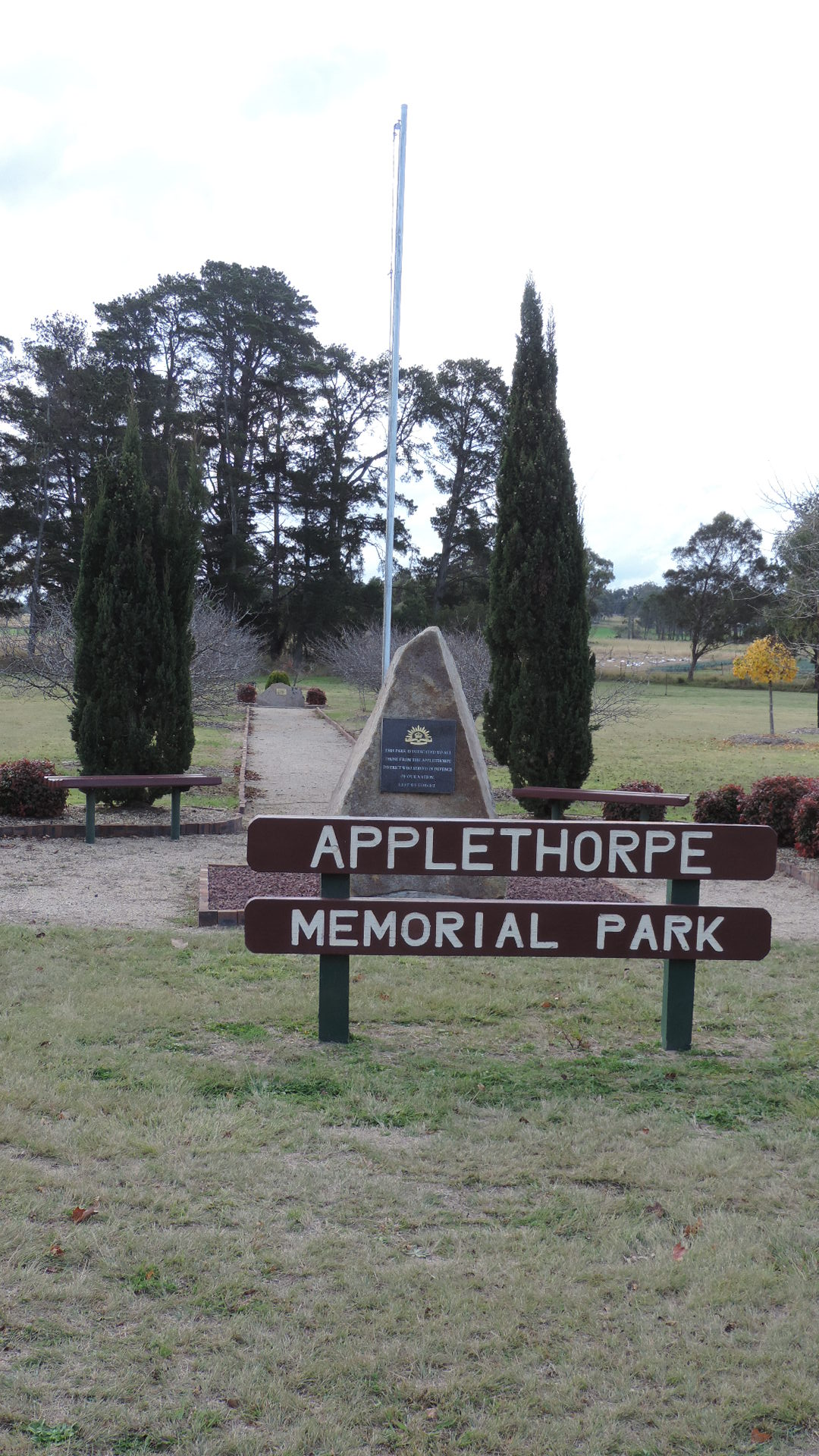
- The Applethorpe Memorial Park

- Interactive map of Applethorpe
- Coordinates: 28.6175°S 151.9552°E
- Country: Australia
- State: Queensland
- LGA: Southern Downs Region
- Location: 5.1 km (3.2 mi) NNE of Stanthorpe; 55.6 km (34.5 mi) S of Warwick; 161 km (100 mi) S of Toowoomba; 213 km (132 mi) SW of Brisbane

Government
  - State electorate: Southern Downs
  - Federal division: Maranoa

Area
  - Total: 46.7 km^{2} (18.0 sq mi)
- Elevation: 872 m (2,861 ft)

Population
  - Total: 571 (2021 census)
  - Density: 12.227/km^{2} (31.67/sq mi)
- Time zone: UTC+10:00 (AEST)
- Postcode: 4378
Localities around Applethorpe
Cannon Creek	The Summit	Glen Niven
Cannon Creek	Applethorpe	Ruby Creek (NSW)
Broadwater	Stanthorpe	Dalcouth

Applethorpe, formerly known as Roessler or Rössler (German: [ˈʁœslɐ] RESS-ler), is a rural town and locality in the Southern Downs Region, Queensland, Australia. It is on Queensland's border with New South Wales. It is well known for the production of apples. It often records the lowest temperatures in Queensland.

In the 2021 census, the locality of Applethorpe had a population of 571 people.

== Geography ==
The town is positioned on the New England Highway just north of Stanthorpe in the Granite Belt region at an elevation of 872 meters (2,861 ft).

The Southern railway line passes through the locality from north (The Summit & Glen Niven) to south (Stanthorpe). The town was served by the now-abandoned Applethorpe railway station (28.6179°S 151.9561°E).

== History ==
The area was originally called Roessler after an early German settler, but the name was changed to Applethorpe (reflecting the apple orchards in the district) in 1915, as part of the anti-German sentiment during World War I.

In 1910, approval for establishment of the Four Mile Stanthorpe School was given and the school was opened on 14 September 1911. However, from November 1911 to November 1916, it was called Roesseller State School. However, like the town itself, in 1917 the school name was changed to Applethorpe State School due to anti-German sentiment.

In December 1910, the Roessler railway station was established at the 200 miles (320 km) point between Thulimbah and Stanthorpe. In September 1916, it was renamed Applethorpe railway station due to anti-German sentiment.

Applethorpe Post Office opened around 1919 (a receiving office had been open since 1916) and closed in 1991.

== Demographics ==
In the 2006 census, the locality of Applethorpe had a population of 748 people; of whom, 20% worked in the farming or produce industries.

In the 2016 census, the locality of Applethorpe had a population of 511 people.

In the 2021 census, the locality of Applethorpe had a population of 571 people.

== Climate ==
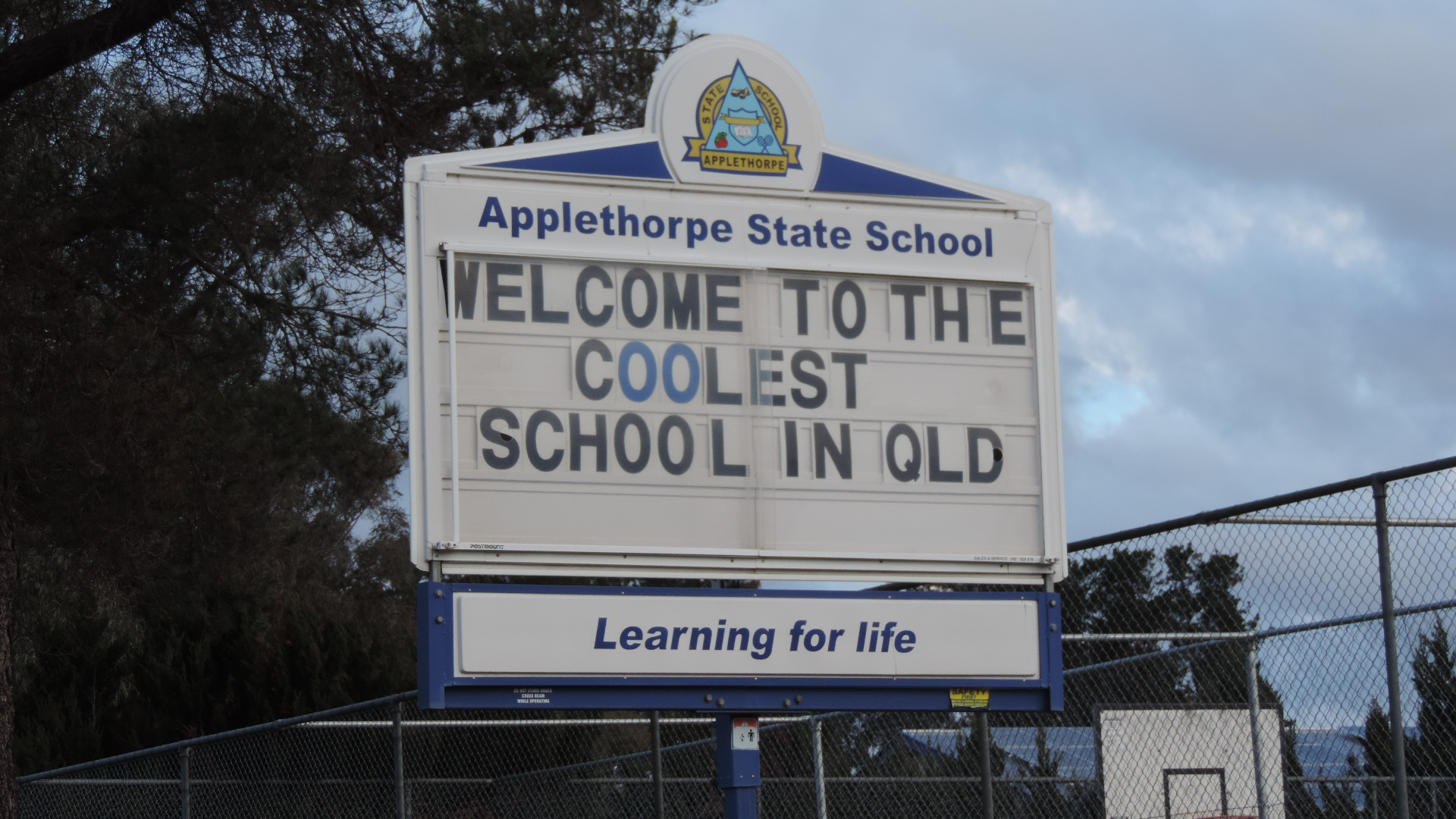
Coolest school in Queensland sign, Applethorpe State School, 2015

During a cold snap in 2007, the town recorded a minimum temperature of −7.7 °C (18.1 °F). In July 2010, Applethorpe recorded a minimum of 13.6 °C (56.5 °F) which was the highest minimum on record ever for that month.

Climate data for Applethorpe (1991–2020 normals, extremes 1966–present)
Month	Jan	Feb	Mar	Apr	May	Jun	Jul	Aug	Sep	Oct	Nov	Dec	Year
Record high °C (°F)	37.8 (100.0)	39.7 (103.5)	35.0 (95.0)	30.1 (86.2)	26.3 (79.3)	22.5 (72.5)	22.3 (72.1)	29.9 (85.8)	31.7 (89.1)	34.7 (94.5)	35.4 (95.7)	37.5 (99.5)	39.7 (103.5)
Mean maximum °C (°F)	33.7 (92.7)	32.5 (90.5)	29.8 (85.6)	26.3 (79.3)	22.5 (72.5)	19.6 (67.3)	19.5 (67.1)	21.9 (71.4)	26.6 (79.9)	29.2 (84.6)	30.9 (87.6)	32.4 (90.3)	35.0 (95.0)
Mean daily maximum °C (°F)	27.5 (81.5)	26.1 (79.0)	24.7 (76.5)	21.6 (70.9)	18.1 (64.6)	15.2 (59.4)	14.8 (58.6)	16.6 (61.9)	20.2 (68.4)	22.8 (73.0)	24.9 (76.8)	26.3 (79.3)	21.6 (70.9)
Daily mean °C (°F)	21.5 (70.7)	20.7 (69.3)	19.1 (66.4)	15.7 (60.3)	11.9 (53.4)	9.3 (48.7)	8.5 (47.3)	9.6 (49.3)	13.1 (55.6)	16.0 (60.8)	18.4 (65.1)	20.2 (68.4)	15.3 (59.5)
Mean daily minimum °C (°F)	15.4 (59.7)	15.3 (59.5)	13.6 (56.5)	9.7 (49.5)	5.7 (42.3)	3.4 (38.1)	2.3 (36.1)	2.6 (36.7)	6.1 (43.0)	9.1 (48.4)	11.9 (53.4)	14.1 (57.4)	9.1 (48.4)
Mean minimum °C (°F)	9.9 (49.8)	10.8 (51.4)	7.5 (45.5)	2.9 (37.2)	−1.7 (28.9)	−3.9 (25.0)	−4.2 (24.4)	−4.0 (24.8)	−0.8 (30.6)	2.1 (35.8)	5.3 (41.5)	8.4 (47.1)	−5.3 (22.5)
Record low °C (°F)	5.4 (41.7)	4.3 (39.7)	0.3 (32.5)	−3.5 (25.7)	−6.1 (21.0)	−7.8 (18.0)	−8.4 (16.9)	−6.6 (20.1)	−5.1 (22.8)	−2.2 (28.0)	0.0 (32.0)	2.9 (37.2)	−8.4 (16.9)
Average precipitation mm (inches)	92.6 (3.65)	81.9 (3.22)	65.0 (2.56)	29.8 (1.17)	37.4 (1.47)	39.6 (1.56)	35.8 (1.41)	34.9 (1.37)	34.2 (1.35)	74.5 (2.93)	69.9 (2.75)	102.6 (4.04)	698.1 (27.48)
Average precipitation days (≥ 1 mm)	7.9	7.7	6.8	4.2	4.6	6.0	4.7	4.0	4.3	7.4	8.1	8.1	73.8
Average dew point °C (°F)	14.7 (58.5)	14.8 (58.6)	13.7 (56.7)	10.5 (50.9)	6.9 (44.4)	5.2 (41.4)	3.6 (38.5)	2.4 (36.3)	4.8 (40.6)	8.1 (46.6)	10.9 (51.6)	13.0 (55.4)	9.1 (48.4)
Source 1: National Oceanic and Atmospheric Administration
Source 2: Bureau of Meteorology

== Transport ==
Applethorpe is accessible by the New England Highway Crisps Coaches also runs regular services to Applethorpe from Brisbane, Toowoomba, and other cities in the area.

Despite the name, Stanthorpe Airport is on Aerodrome Road in the east of Applethorpe (28.6223°S 151.9829°E). It is a public airport operated by the Southern Downs Regional Council. There are no regular scheduled services to this airport.

== Education ==
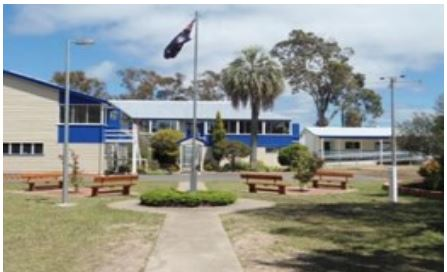
Applethorpe State School, 2023

Applethorpe State School is a government primary (Prep-6) school for boys and girls at 25576 New England Highway (28.6125°S 151.9553°E). In 2017, the school had an enrolment of 38 students with 4 teachers (3 full-time equivalent) and 5 non-teaching staff (3 full-time equivalent).

There are no secondary schools in Applethorpe. The nearest government secondary school is Stanthorpe State High School in neighbouring Stanthorpe to the south.

== Attractions ==
The Applethorpe Memorial Park on Ann Street commemorates those who served in defence of Australia.

Granite Mountain Disc Golf course is also located in Applethorpe. It is a privately owned frisbee golf course, that hosted both the 2018 and 2019 Queensland state championships of the sport.

The "Summit Fruit Run" (Tourist Drive 3) is a 12-kilometre (7.5 mi) tourist drive from Applethorpe to Dalveen, passing through fruit-growing areas with opportunities to purchase fruit.
