= St Denys Anglican Church =

St Denys Anglican Church, Amiens
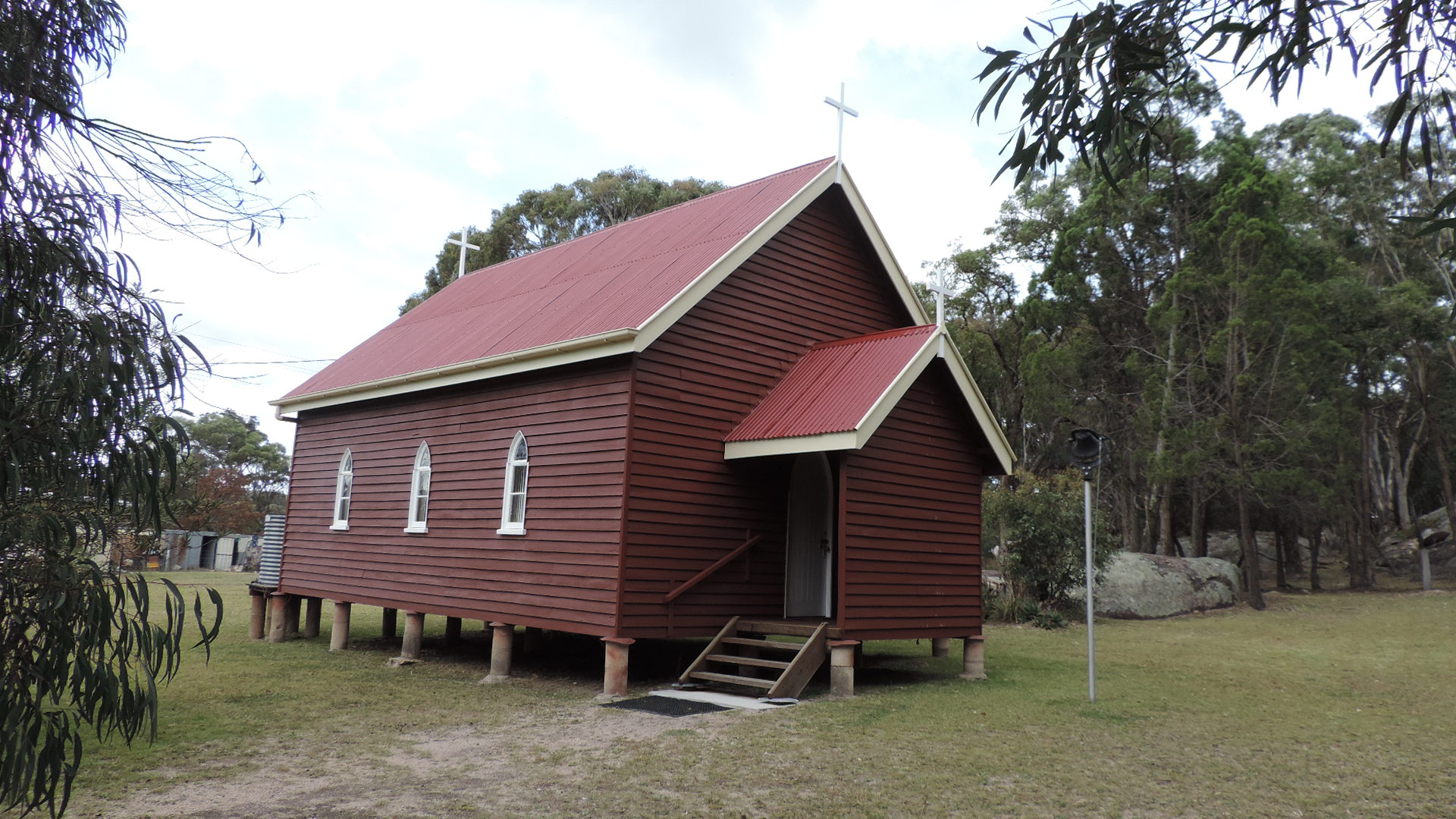
- St Denys Anglican Church, Amiens, 2015

- Location within Queensland Location within Australia
- 28.5906°S 151.8087°E
- Location: 17 Trevethan Lane, Amiens, Southern Downs Region, Queensland, Australia

History
- Design period: 1919 - 1930s (interwar period)
- Built: 1923

Site notes
- Architectural style: Gothic

Queensland Heritage Register
- Official name: St Denys Anglican Church, Church of St Denys
- Type: state heritage (built)
- Designated: 3 August 2005
- Reference no.: 602530
- Significant period: 1920s (historical) ongoing (social)
- Significant components: church, furniture/fittings, views to

St Denys Anglican Church is a heritage-listed church at 17 Trevethan Lane, Amiens, Southern Downs Region, Queensland, Australia. It was built in 1923. It is also known as Church of St Denys. It was added to the Queensland Heritage Register on 3 August 2005.

== History ==
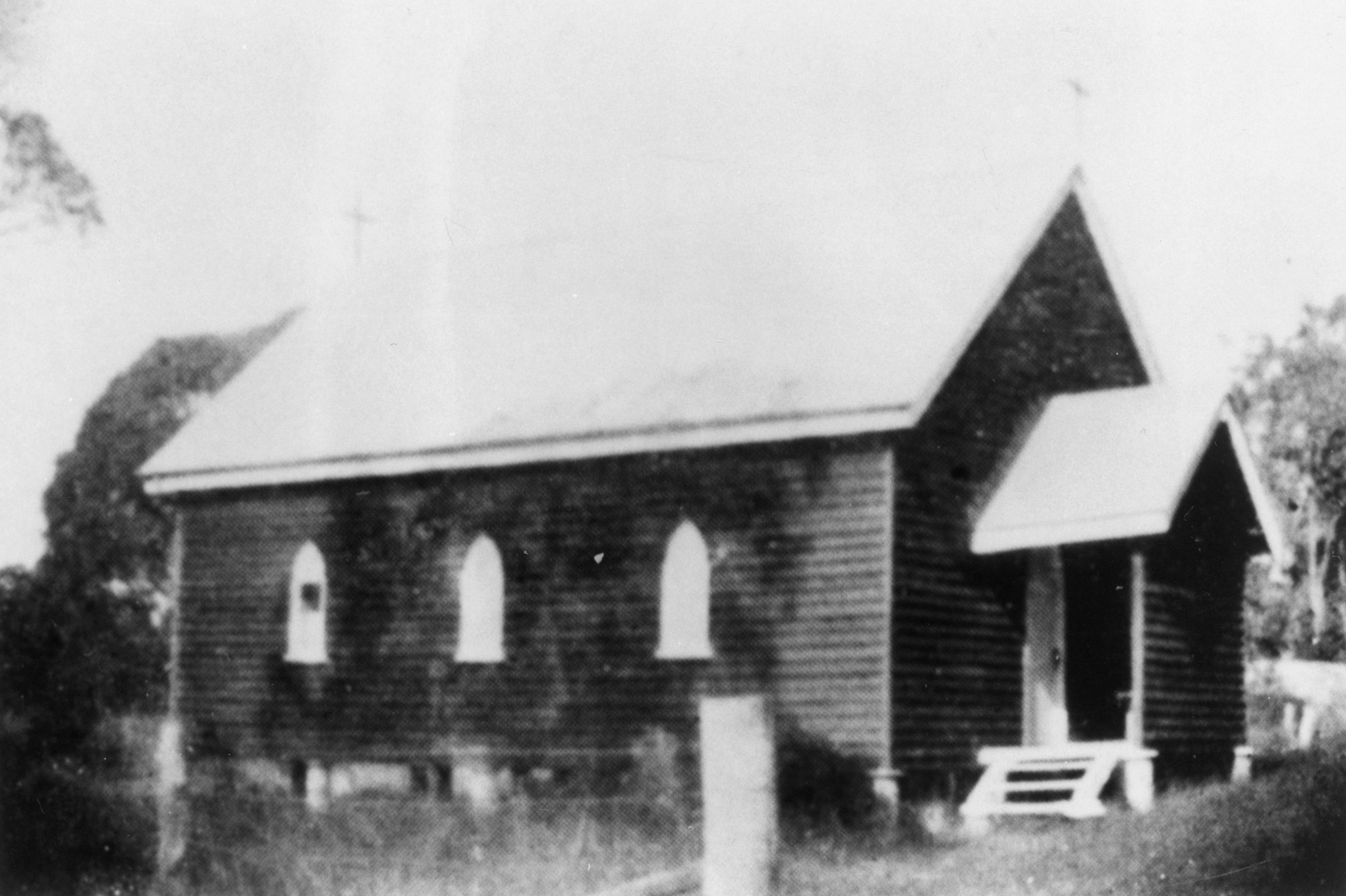
St. Denys Church of England, Amiens

The Church of St Denys is a small timber church built in 1923 to serve a soldier settlement at Amiens.

Under the provisions of The Discharged Soldiers' Settlement Act 1917 land was resumed or set aside for returned soldiers. The intent of the act was to create a "land fit for heroes" and promote a yeomen farming class to aid in the more intensive farming and closer settlement of regional Australia. The schemes, while well intentioned, failed on the most part because blocks were too small to be economically viable. In the Stanthorpe Shire about 17400 acres was set aside for this purpose in the parishes of Pikedale and Marsh. Over 700 returned soldiers were allocated blocks in what become the Pikedale Soldier Settlement area. At the time the area consisted mostly of a number of small railway sidings with a store and/or post office.

In 1922 the Church of England Diocesan and the Soldiers' Church of England Help Society provided a grant to assist the Reverend C D Gillman, a returned soldier, residing in Amiens to work on the soldier settlements. A church was built in 1923 from £335 sourced from the Soldiers' Church of England Help Society. The altar ornaments and frontal cloth came from the Australian base at Le Havre and are believed to originate from the Cathedral in Amiens, presented to the Church at Amiens, Queensland as a token of gratitude for the part played by Australian soldiers in France during the 1914-18 war, such as the Battle of Amiens. Additionally both the altar and credence table were donated to the church by the Ladies Guild, Palmer Green, London in 1923.

The modest nature of the church matches the modest means of the area and the fortunes of those soldier settlers who moved to Amiens. The church in this respect reflects the community it serves. The link between the church in Queensland and the wartime service in France of many of the congregation is reflected in the dedication of the building to the patron saint of France, Saint Denys. This link is further reflected in the gifts made to the church and demonstrates the lasting effects of this experience on those who returned.

Maintenance of the church has been undertaken by the St Denys guild, volunteers, many of which are descendants of the original soldier settlers. Currently the church does not have a resident priest, but is serviced as part of the Stanthorpe parish. Church services are irregularly held via public notice in the local Stanthorpe Border Post newspaper.

The church is very intact with only a new set of steps to the entry porch recently added approximately 10 years ago.

== Description ==
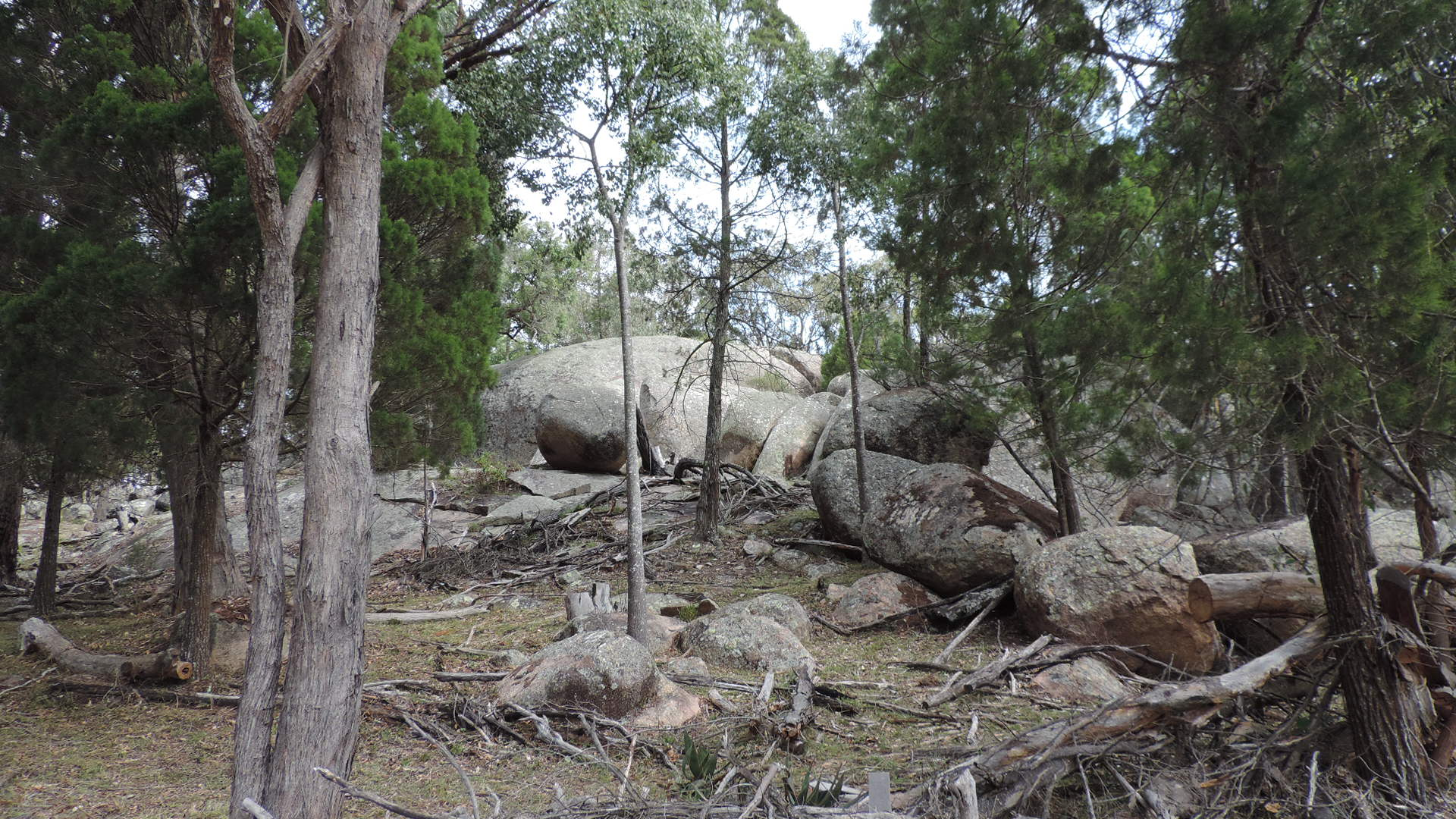
Granite boulder strewn hill, beside St Denys Anglican Church, 2015

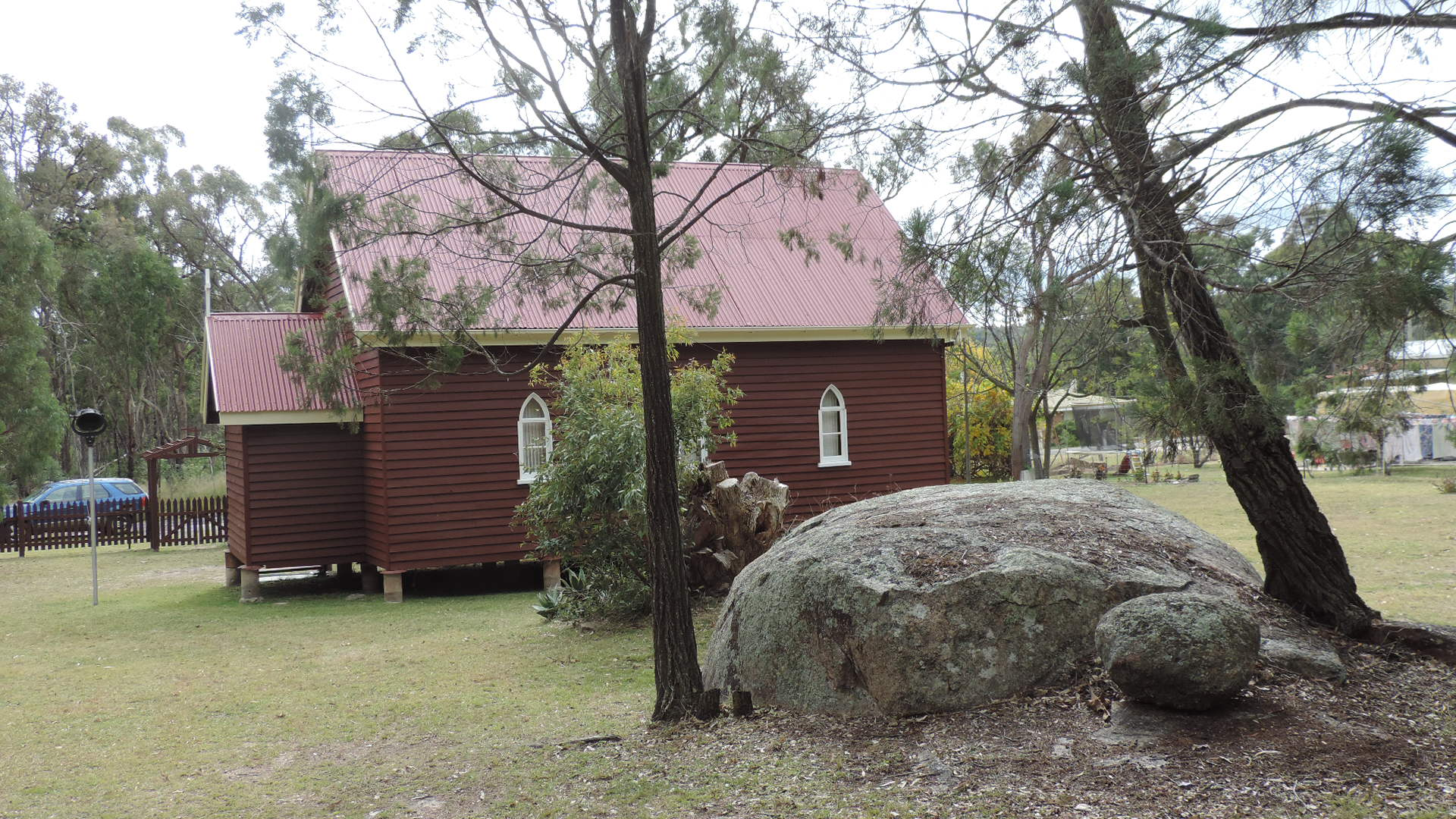
Granite outcrop in churchyard, 2015

St Denys Anglican Church is located on a level block that backs on to a low granite boulder strewn hill, immediately east of the church is another outcropping of bounders with some local eucalypts. Amiens is within the area known as the Granite Belt of Queensland.

The church is a small single-stored timber building, rectangular in plan, set on low, circular sectioned concrete posts. It has a steeply pitched gable roof clad in short lengths of corrugated iron. The entry porch is located at the rear of the building and has a small steeply pitched gabled roof, accessed by recently added timber steps set into a steel staircase on the left-hand side of the entry porch. The building has three small lancet windows along both sides of the building.

A single arched door way connects the entry to the church. The interior is simple and austere with the ceiling and floor lined with stained cypress pine. The altar is on a low platform and holds a brass cross, two candlesticks and a lectern. The sanctuary also contains a wooden cabinet and a bench seat and desk. The altar cloth is considered a significant component of the altar furnishings for its connection between St Denys Anglican Church and the battlefield Church of Le Harve.

== Heritage listing ==
St Denys Anglican Church was listed on the Queensland Heritage Register on 3 August 2005 having satisfied the following criteria.

The place is important in demonstrating the evolution or pattern of Queensland's history.

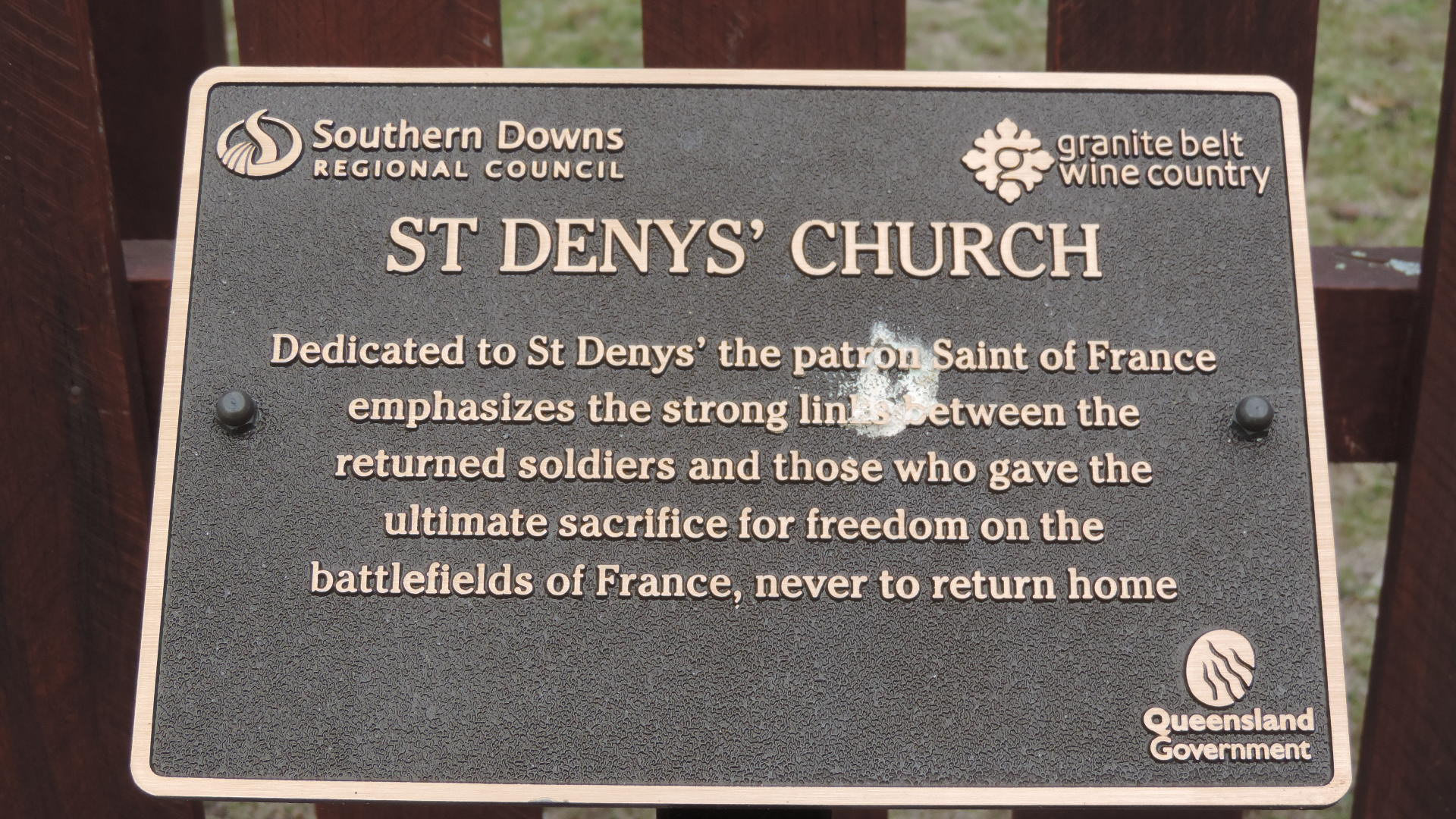
Plaque, St Denys Anglican Church, Amiens, 2015

As a soldier settlement church with direct links to France, St Denys Anglican Church is important as evidence for the soldier settlement movement following the First World War and for the closer settlement of the Pikedale area.

The church is significant for its association with those who took up property under this scheme and their descendants. It is directly linked to Australian war service in France through the dedication of the Church to St Denys, the Patron Saint of France, but also through the frontal cloth and altar ornaments, which originate from the Cathedral in Amiens, France and used in the military church at the Australian base at Le Harve [sic].

The place has a strong or special association with a particular community or cultural group for social, cultural or spiritual reasons.

St Denys Church has a strong association with the people of Amiens and the surrounding area for spiritual and cultural reasons having provided pastoral care and social contacts in the region for over eighty years.
