= Stanthorpe Airport =

Airport in Queensland, Australia

- IATA: SNH; ICAO: YSPE

Summary
- Airport type: Public
- Operator: Southern Downs Regional Council
- Serves: Stanthorpe, Queensland
- Elevation AMSL: 2,934 ft / 894 m
- Coordinates: 28°37′06.0″S 151°59′24.0″E

Map
- Location in Queensland

Runways
Direction	Length		Surface
Direction	m	ft	Surface
08/26	1,711	5,614
- Sources: Australian AIP and aerodrome chart

Stanthorpe Airport (IATA: SNH, ICAO: YSPE) is located at Applethorpe to the immediate north of Stanthorpe, Southern Downs Region, Queensland, Australia.

== See also ==
- List of airports in Queensland
