= Bapaume, Queensland =

Bapaume
- Suburb
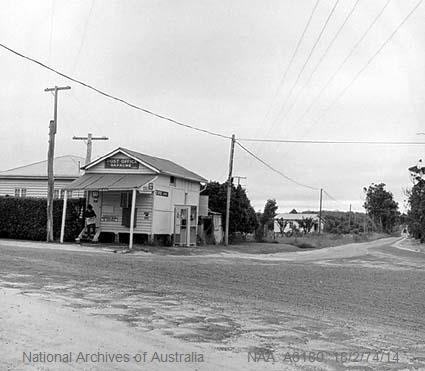
- Bapaume Post Office, 1974

- Interactive map of Bapaume
- Coordinates: 28.5752°S 151.8408°E
- Country: Australia
- State: Queensland
- LGA: Southern Downs Region
- Location: 15.6 km (9.7 mi) NW of Stanthorpe; 64.8 km (40.3 mi) SSW of Warwick; 147 km (91 mi) S of Toowoomba; 223 km (139 mi) SW of Brisbane

Government
  - State electorate: Southern Downs
  - Federal division: Maranoa

Area
  - Total: 13.5 km^{2} (5.2 sq mi)

Population
  - Total: 123 (2021 census)
  - Density: 9.11/km^{2} (23.60/sq mi)
- Time zone: UTC+10:00 (AEST)
- Postcode: 4352
Suburbs around Bapaume
Passchendaele	Passchendaele	Pozieres
Amiens	Bapaume	Pozieres
Amiens	Amiens	Cannon Creek

Bapaume is a rural locality in the Southern Downs Region, Queensland, Australia. In the 2021 census, Bapaume had a population of 123 people.

== Geography ==
Bapaume railway siding point was on the Southern railway line, but the siding is now dismantled (28.5645°S 151.8312°E).

The land use is a mixture of grazing on native vegetation and irrigated horticulture, mostly temperate fruit orchards, including apples, pears, berries, and stonefruits.

== History ==
Bapaume takes its name from the Bapaume railway station, named by the Queensland Railways Department in 1920, after a World War I battlefield in France, involving the Australian Imperial Force. The area was opened as soldier settlements after 1919.

Bapaume Provisional School opened on 28 January 1925. In 1948 it became Bapaume State School. It closed on 10 December 1982. The school was on a 5-acre (2.0 ha) site at 843-853 Cannon Creek Road (28.57637°S 151.84539°E). As at December 2020, the school building was still on the site.

== Demographics ==
In the 2016 census, Bapaume had a population of 130 people.

In the 2021 census, Bapaume had a population of 123 people.

== Education ==
There are no schools in Bapaume. The nearest government primary schools are Pozieres State School in neighbouring Pozieres to the north-east and Amiens State School in neighbouring Amiens to the south-west. The nearest government secondary school is Stanthorpe State High School in Stanthorpe to the south-east.
