= Pozieres, Queensland =

Pozieres
- Suburb
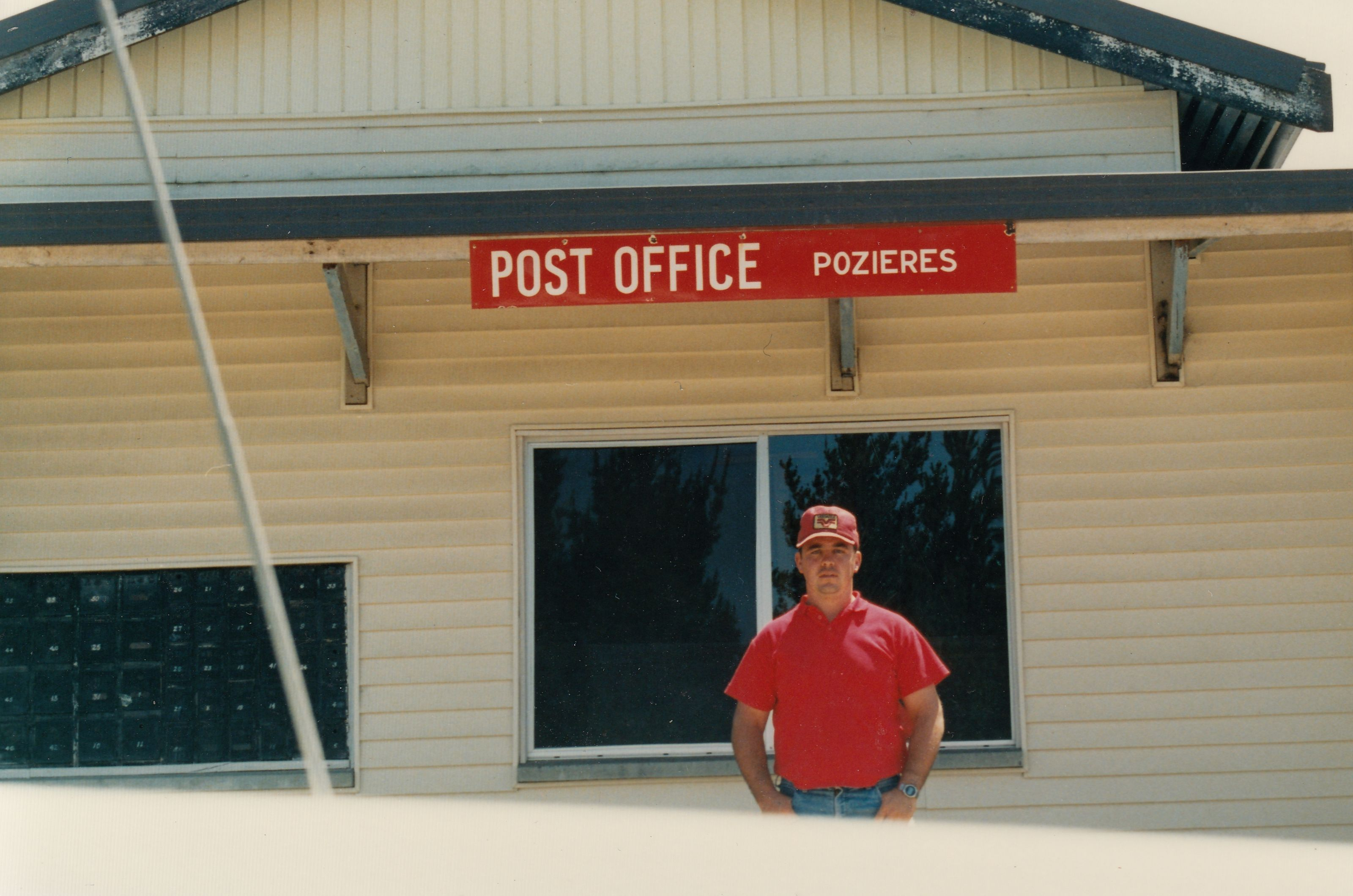
- Post office, Pozieres, 1980s

- Interactive map of Pozieres
- Coordinates: 28.5275°S 151.8658°E
- Country: Australia
- State: Queensland
- LGA: Southern Downs Region
- Location: 20.2 km (12.6 mi) NNW of Stanthorpe; 55.6 km (34.5 mi) SSW of Warwick; 175 km (109 mi) SW of Ipswich; 214 km (133 mi) SW of Brisbane

Government
  - State electorate: Southern Downs
  - Federal division: Maranoa

Area
  - Total: 47.0 km^{2} (18.1 sq mi)

Population
  - Total: 208 (2021 census)
  - Density: 4.426/km^{2} (11.46/sq mi)
- Time zone: UTC+10:00 (AEST)
- Postcode: 4352
Suburbs around Pozieres
Dalveen	Dalveen	Fleurbaix
Passchendaele	Pozieres	Thulimbah
Bapaume	Cannon Creek	The Summit

Pozieres is a rural locality in the Southern Downs Region, Queensland, Australia. In the 2021 census, Pozieres had a population of 208 people.

== Geography ==
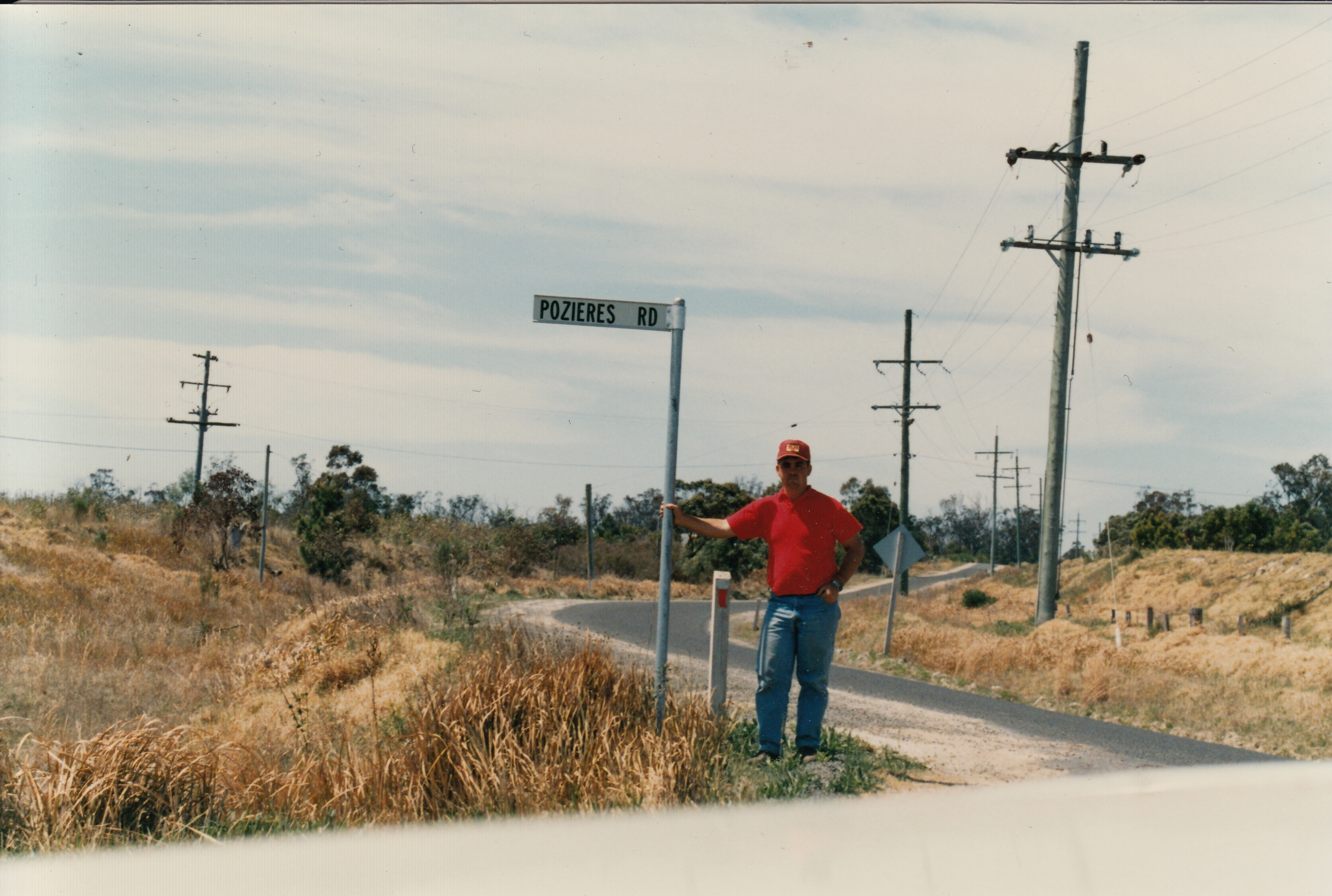
Landscape, Pozieres, 1980s

Pozieres railway station is an abandoned railway station (28.5286°S 151.8856°E) on the now-closed Amiens branch railway of the Southern railway line.

== History ==
Following World War I, Pozieres was one of the Pikedale soldier settlements established in the Granite Belt area of the Darling Downs. As part of this initiative, the Amiens branch railway was constructed west of Cottonvale. The line was not built to convey passengers but rather to transport fruit from the soldiers' orchards to markets in Brisbane and Sydney. The line was opened on 7 June 1920 and it closed on 28 February 1974.

The name Pozieres comes from the Pozieres railway station, named by the Queensland Railways Department in 1920, which in turn was suggested by surveyor George Grant and the Returned Soldiers and Sailors Imperial League of Australia, commemorating the famous World War I Battle of Pozières. The grave accent in Pozières is omitted as Queensland Government policy on place naming restricts names to the "standard alphabet".

A postal receiving office was opened at Pozieres on 1 May 1921, upgraded to a post office about March 1924.

Pozieres State School opened on 16 June 1921.

In November 1921, an Anglican minister, Reverend Alan Thompson, was appointed to the soldier settlement towns but at June 1922, the parishioners were lobbying for a church as services were being held in private homes.

Pozieres Anglican Church Centre opened circa 1929. It is now closed.

== Demographics ==
In the 2016 census, Pozieres had a population of 145 people.

In the 2021 census, Pozieres had a population of 208 people.

== Education ==
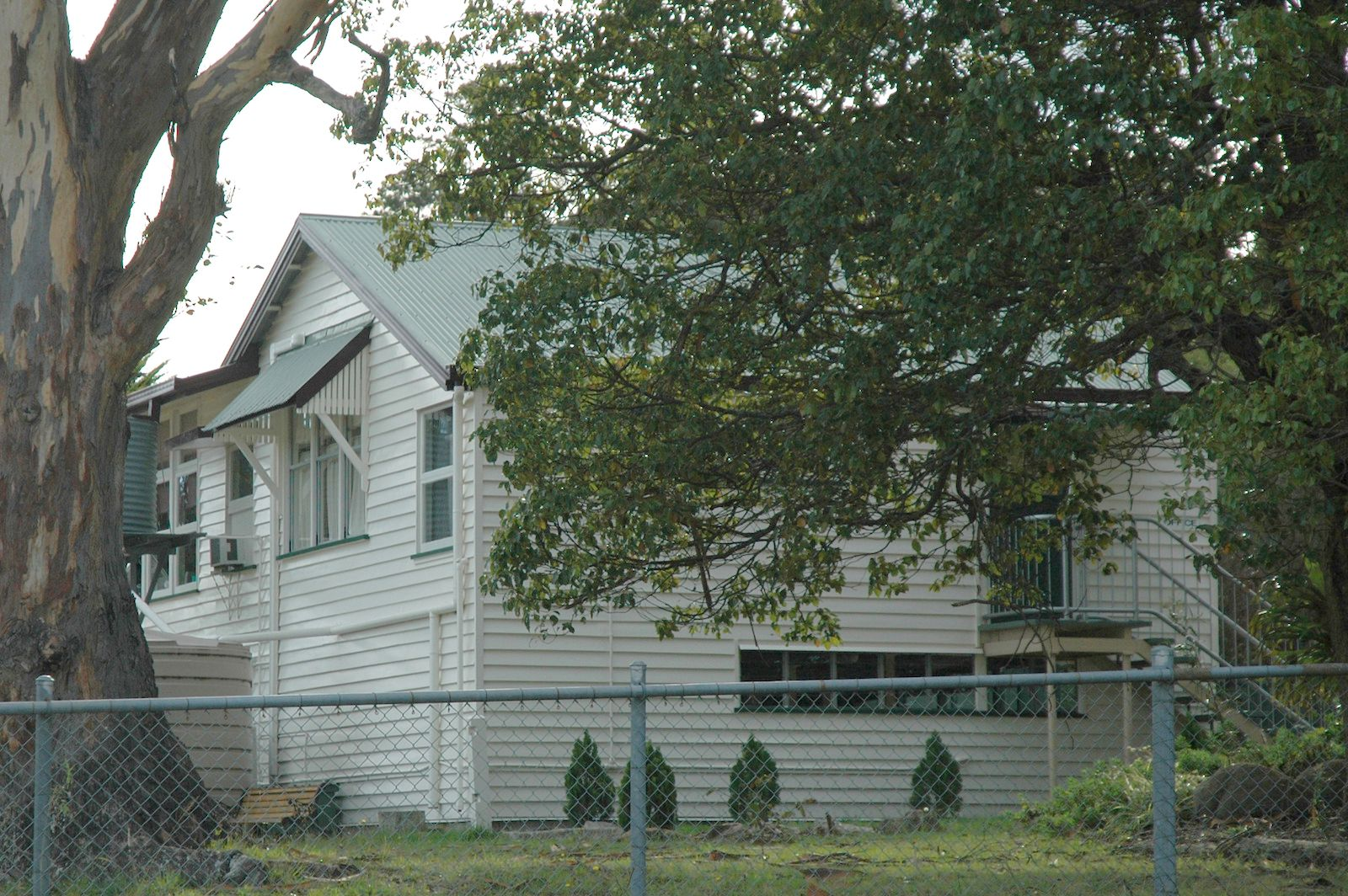
Pozieres State School, 2009

Pozieres State School is a government primary (Prep-6) school for boys and girls at 45-47 Pozieres School Road (28.5248°S 151.8847°E). In 2016, the school had an enrolment of 7 students with 2 teachers (1 full-time equivalent) and 3 non-teaching staff (1 full-time equivalent). In 2018, the school had an enrolment of 8 students with 2 teachers (1 full-time equivalent) and 3 non-teaching staff (1 full-time equivalent).

There are no secondary schools in Pozieres. The nearest government secondary school is Stanthorpe State High School in Stanthorpe to the south.

There is also a Catholic primary-and-secondary school in Stanthorpe.
