= Maryland, New South Wales =

Maryland
- Suburb
- Interactive map of Maryland
- Coordinates: 32°51′54″S 151°40′5″E
- Country: Australia
- State: New South Wales
- City: Newcastle
- LGA: City of Newcastle
- Location: 14 km (8.7 mi) WNW of Newcastle

Government
  - State electorate: Wallsend
  - Federal division: Newcastle

Area
  - Total: 4.0 km^{2} (1.5 sq mi)

Population
  - Total: 7,714 (SAL 2021)
- Postcode: 2287
- Parish: Hexham
Suburbs around Maryland
	Hexham
Fletcher	Maryland	Shortland
Wallsend	Wallsend	Shortland

Maryland is a suburb of Newcastle, New South Wales, Australia, located 14 kilometres (9 mi) from Newcastle's central business district. It is part of the City of Newcastle local government area.

Maryland has two public and one private school, a Baptist church, a skate-park and a shopping complex. Originally an agricultural area since the 1970s started to become more developed which has an outlook of the wetlands.

== History ==
The name of the suburb comes from the first name of Mary Stephena Cowper, who married George Brooks in 1828, for which they received a land grant of 1280 acres. This land came to be known as Maryland (originally called Merrylands). There was a separate settlement in the area called Glendor, which was acquired by the Thomas family in 1835.

Farm lands in Maryland were initially worked by convict labor. There was once an Aboriginal burying ground in the vicinity of the area.

== Education ==
- Located at 51 T Bell Maryland Primary is a government co ed primary school
- Located at 295 Maryland Drive Glendore Public is a government co ed primary school, established in 1996

== Heritage listings ==
Maryland has a number of heritage-listed sites, including:

- 79 Callan Avenue: Thomas Family Grave
