= Amiens railway line =

Branch railway line in the Granite Belt region of Queensland, Australia

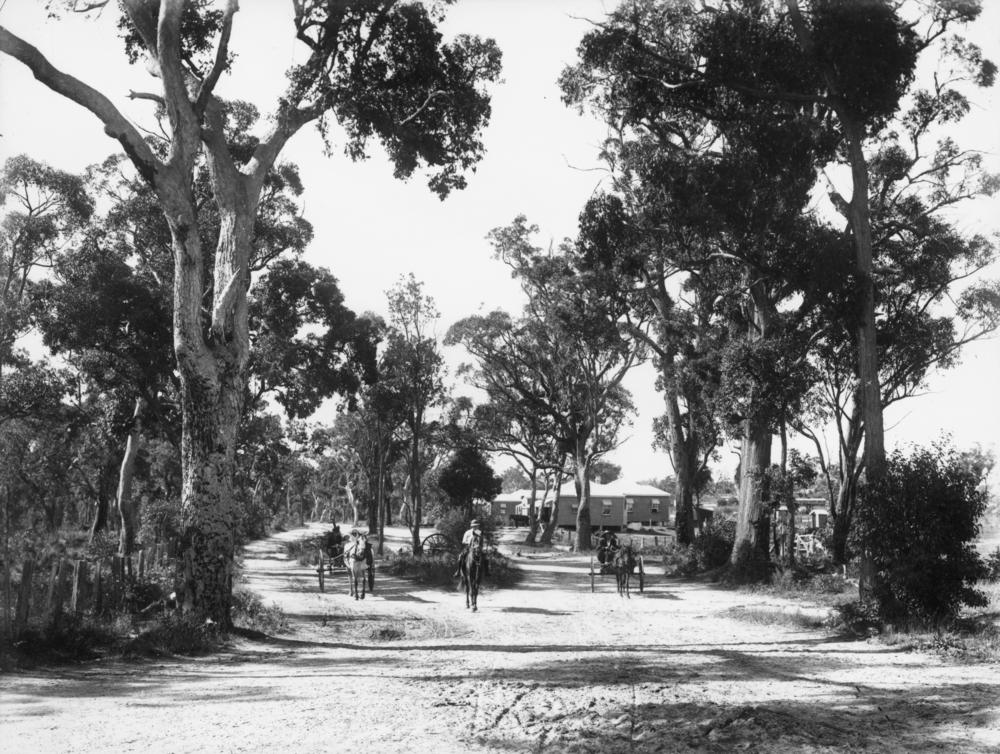
Amiens, 1922

The Amiens railway line was a branch railway in the Granite Belt region of Queensland, Australia, branching from the Southern Line at Cottonvale between Warwick and Stanthorpe. The Amiens line was the highest in southern Queensland, with the railway reaching an elevation of 946 metres above sea level at Pozieres.

== History ==
Construction of a 20-kilometre railway line west of Cottonvale to the village of Amiens was authorised in 1919 to assist returned soldiers who had been granted land in the region. The Amiens branch was designed to serve an agricultural area developed for the settlement of returned servicemen after the First World War. For this reason, all the stations along the line were named after battlegrounds on the Western Front – Fleurbaix, Pozieres, Bullecourt, Passchendaele, Bapaume and Messines. The line was not built to convey passengers but rather to transport fruit from the soldiers' orchards to markets in Brisbane and Sydney.

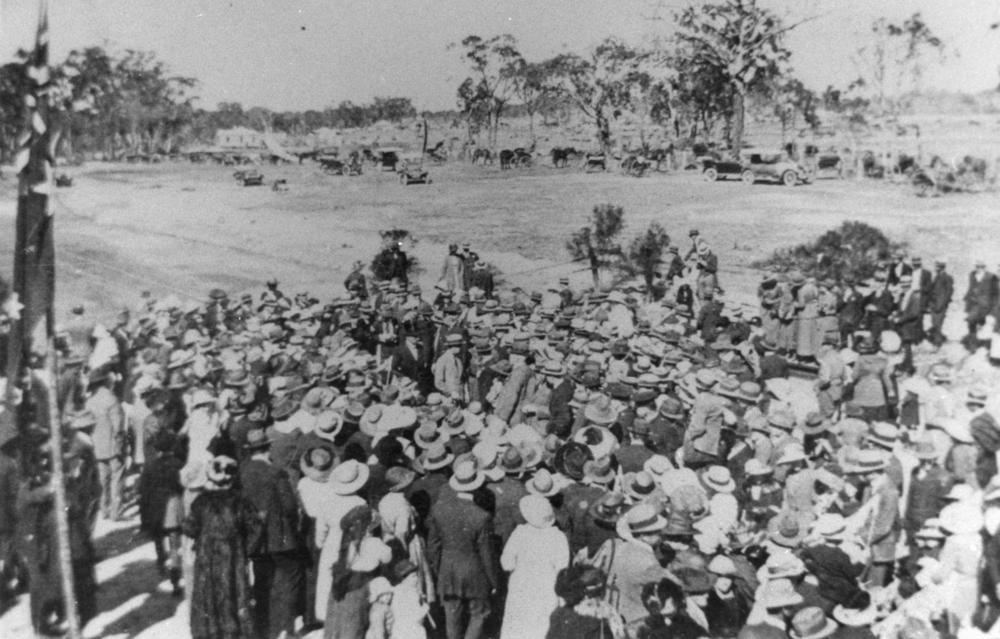
Large crowd gathered for the royal visit, Amiens, 1920

Construction commenced in 1919 and the line was opened on 7 June 1920. Edward, Prince of Wales travelled the length of the Amiens branch in a royal train to officially open the line on 26 July 1920.

The line closed on 28 February 1974.

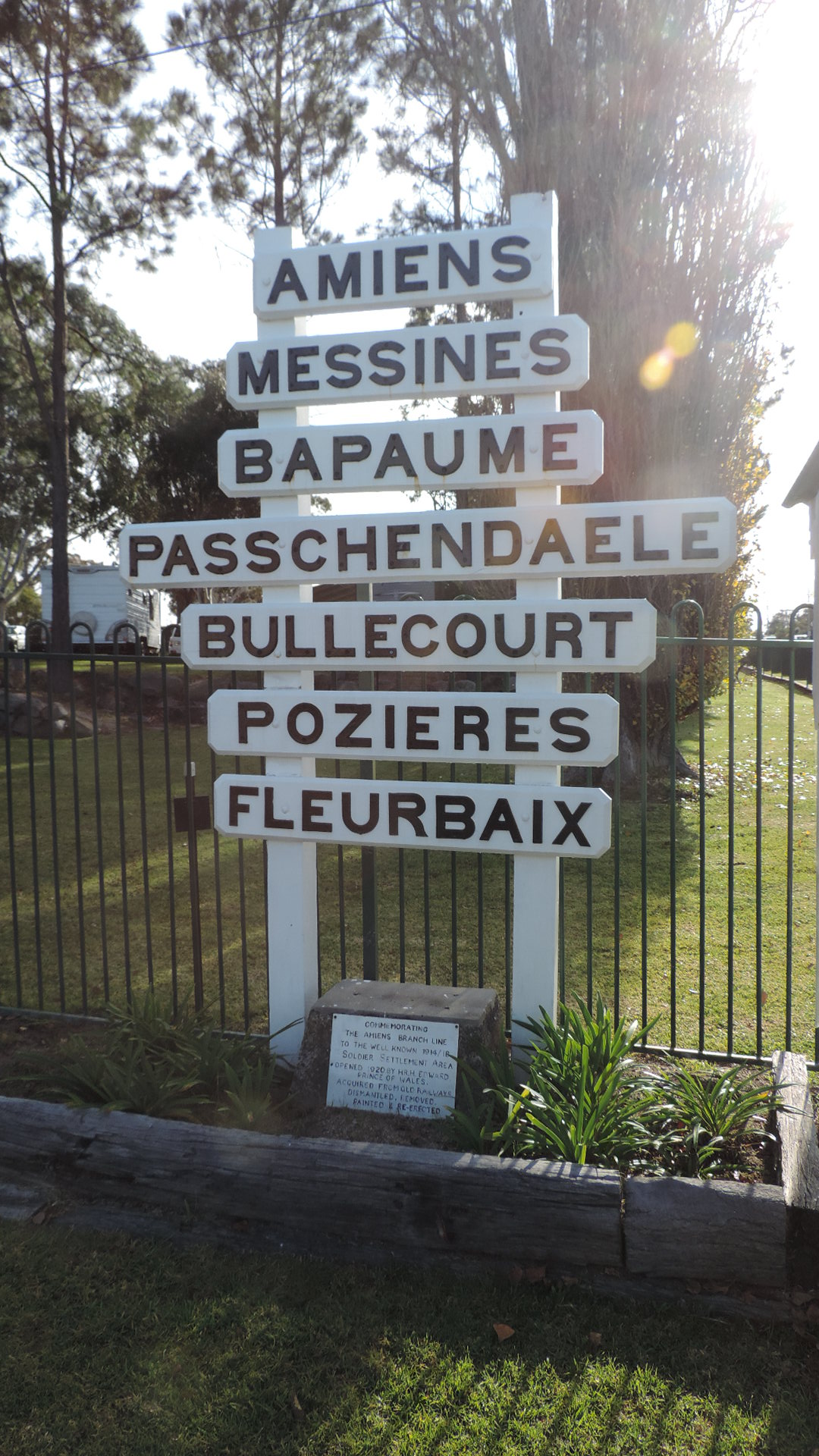
Railway station signs for the Amiens railway line serving the Pikedale soldier settlement towns of Amiens, Messines, Bapaume, Passchendaele, Bullecourt, Pozieres, Fleurbaix, now on display at the Stanthorpe Heritage Museum

The railway station signs from the Amiens railway line are now on display at the Stanthorpe Heritage Museum.

== See also ==
- Rail transport in Queensland
