= Song (Chinese surname) =

- Song character in ancient script on top, modern script at bottom
- Pronunciation: Sòng (Mandarin)
- Language: Chinese

Other names
- Variant forms: Sung, Soong, Tống

Song is the pinyin transliteration of the Chinese family name 宋. It is transliterated as Sung in Wade-Giles, and Soong is also a common transliteration. In addition to being a common surname, it is also the name of a Chinese dynasty, the Song dynasty, written with the same character.

In 2019, it was the 24th most common surname in Mainland China.

== Historical origin ==
The first written record of the character 宋 (Sòng) was found on the oracle bones of the Shang dynasty.

=== State of Song ===
In the written records of Chinese history, the first time the character Song was used as a surname appeared in the early stage of the Zhou dynasty. One of the children of the last emperor of the Shang dynasty, Weizi Qi (微子启), was a duke from the state named Song, who descended from his ancestor Xie (契) whose name was derived from the surname Zi (子). Xie was born from Jiandi from the swallow from the blackbird egg, who came from Yousong (有娀), the legendary state, at north of Mount Buzhou. The State of Song, Song's dominion, became part of the Zhou dynasty after the fall of the Shang dynasty, and was inherited from the dynasty formally in 11th century BC. Citizens of the former State of Song commemorated the overthrow of their state in 286 BC by the State of Qi owned by Tian, who began to use the character Song as their surname, which is the authentic branch.

=== Song dynasty ===
- Emperor Huizong of Song's officer changed his name to Song, using the dynasty name as a family name, which was the imperial clan branch of the Song dynasty.
- Charlie Soong changed his family name from Han to Soon, then Soong, which was one of the accepted English spellings of the dynasty name Song, the dynasty from the tenth to the thirteenth century in China.

=== Others ===
- A branch of Miao people located in Guizhou announced that they are descendants of State of Song. Historically called Songjia (宋家), known as Chiefdom of Shuidong afterwards, there was a sub-branch that merged in Luodian Kingdom as Yi-speaking people.
- A clan of Xiqiang (西羌) people submitted to Northern Wei dynasty during the Northern and Southern dynasties period in the year AD 518 using that surname. Previously, there was a person called Song Jian (宋建) from Fuhan, who was one of the leaders of Liang Province rebellion who belonged to the Qiang tribes.
- There is a family clan originally located in Pingyang called Dashila (答失剌) who have used this character since the Ming dynasty.
- Moreover, the surname branched off into a clan derived from an ancestor named Temuer or Timur (帖木儿) with the grant of a seal who used the character since Ming dynasty. From the history records, it may refer to Knight of Fenyang, who is the descendant of Godan Khan.

== Blood type distribution ==
Population of surname Song's ABO blood type distribution is O blood type 31.3%, B blood type 30.6%, A blood type 28.4% and AB blood type 9.7%.

== Variations ==
A less common Chinese family name, Chóng (崇) can also be transliterated to Soong in some Chinese dialects.

The surname Song is also used in Korea.

In Vietnam, the surname is pronounced as Tống.

== Notable people ==
=== Historical figures ===
- Song Wuji, Zhou dynasty fangshi of Fangxian Tao in State of Yan
- Song Yu, Zhou dynasty poet
- Song Yi, died 207 BC, minister of Chu
- Empress Song (Han dynasty), Han dynasty empress
- Song Qian, Eastern Wu military officer in the Three Kingdoms era
- Song Hun, d. 361, regent of the Chinese state Former Liang during the Sixteen Kingdoms era
- Song Bian, Northern Wei official, during the Northern and Southern dynasties period
- Song Zhiwen, b. 656, early Tang dynasty poet
- Song Jingang, d. 620, one of leaders of popular uprising during the late Sui dynasty
- Song Jing, b. 663, Tang dynasty chancellor
- Song Shenxi, d. 833, Tang dynasty chancellor
- Song Wentong, b. 856, Tang dynasty warlord, changed surname to Li since 886
- Song Jingyang, b.911, local chief administrative officer became Tusi chieftain of Chiefdom of Shuidong
- Empress Song (Song dynasty), b. 952, entitled Empress Xiaozhang during the early Song dynasty
- Song Shou, b. 991, Song dynasty assistant administer of political affairs
- Song Di, b. ca. 1015, Song dynasty scholar-official and artist
- Song Ci, b. 1186, Song dynasty writer of Collected Cases of Injustice Rectified
- Song Zhun, Song dynasty scholar
- Song Lian, b. 1310, Ming dynasty historian
- Song Maojin, b. 1368, Ming dynasty landscape painter
- Song Xu, b. 1525, Ming dynasty landscape painter
- Song Maocheng, b. 1570, Ming dynasty writer, changed surname from Zhao family clan
- Song Yingxing, b. 1587, Ming dynasty scientist and encyclopedist
- Song Wan, b. 1614, Qing dynasty Chinese poet and government official
- Song Aimin, b. 1978, discus thrower
- Song Andong, b. 1997, first Chinese-born ice hockey player ever drafted by an NHL pro team (2015)
- Anna Song, b. 1976, Taiwanese American journalist
- Song Dan, b. 1990, female Chinese javelin thrower
- Song Dandan, b. 1961, actress
- Song Defu (politician), b. 1946, Communist Party politician
- Devon Song, b. 1980, Taiwanese singer-songwriter
- Song Hongjuan, b. 1984, Chinese race walker
- Jeannette Song, Chinese and American management scientist
- Song Jian, b. 1931, aerospace engineer, demographer, and politician
- Song Jiaoren, b. 1882, President of the Kuomintang
- Song Lianyong, b. 1965, football player from Hong Kong
- Song Ligang, b. 1967, Chinese basketball player
- Song Lun, b. 1981, figure skater
- Song Nan, b. 1990, figure skater
- Sir Song Ong Siang, b. 1871, Singaporean lawyer and Knight Commander of the Order of the British Empire
- Song Ping, b. 1917, Communist Party official
- Song Qian b. 1987, leader of the female South Korean group f(x)
- Song Qiyun (1904–1949), Chinese Communist Party member executed by the Kuomintang
- Raymond Song, b. 1994, Taiwanese chess player
- Song Renqiong, b. 1909, PLA general
- Sarah Song, b. 1985, Miss Chinese International 2007
- Song Shijie, b. 1873, Chinese revolutionary
- Song Shi-Lun, b. 1899, PLA general
- Song Tao, b. 1965, basketball player
- Song Tao, b. 1955, diplomat and politician
- Song Weilong, b. 1999, Chinese actor and model
- Song Weiping, b. 1967, billionaire
- Song Xi, b. 1920, former President of the Chinese Culture University
- Song Xiaobo, b. 1958, female basketball player and coach
- Song Yaxuan, b. 2004, Chinese singer and actor
- Song Yuqi, b. 1999, Chinese dancer, singer, member of the South Korean group (G)I-dle
- Song Yuren, b. 1857, early period positive reformist philosopher
- Song Zhenyu, b. 1981, football player
- Song Zhenzhong (1941–1949), son of Song Qiyun, known as "Little Radish Head"
- Song Zheyuan, b. 1885, Kuomintang general
- Song Zude, b. 1968, entertainment manager
- Song Zuying, b. 1966, ethnic Miao Chinese singer
- Soong Ai-ling, b. 1890, wife of H. H. Kung
- Soong Ching-ling, b. 1893, wife of Sun Yat Sen and Vice chairman of the People's Republic of China
- Charlie Soong, b. 1863, missionary and businessman, several of whose children were highly influential in early 20th century China:
  - children include (see, chronologically, below): Soong sisters (Soong Ai-ling, Soong Ching-ling and Soong Mei-ling), and their brother T. V. Soong
- James Soong, b. 1942, Republic of China governor
- Soong Mei-ling, b. 1897, wife of Chiang Kai-shek
- T. V. Soong, b. 1894, businessman and Premier of Taiwan
- Sung Chia-Hao, b. 1992, Taiwanese baseball pitcher who plays with Tohoku Rakuten Golden Eagles
- Sung Chi-li, b. 1948, Taiwanese religious leader
- Sung Nien-yu, b. 1983, Taiwanese singer, songwriter, and record producer
- Peter Sung, b. 1940, Singaporean politician
- Sung Yu-hsieh, b. 1956, former Minister of Research, Development and Evaluation Commission of the Republic of China
- Xinyuan Song, Chinese statistician

== Fictional characters ==
- Song Jiang, major character in 14th century novel Water Margin, one of the Four Great Classical Novels of Chinese literature
- Song Ju, fictional character in Hit-Girl In Hong Kong
- Song Qing younger brother of Song Jiang
- Song Wan, fictional character in the Water Margin
- Song Yiren, character featured within the famed Ming dynasty novel Investiture of the Gods
- Song Yuanqiao, b. 1295, character in novel The Heaven Sword and Dragon Saber by Jin Yong
- Song Qingshu, son of Song Yuanqiao
- Noonien Soong, The creator of the android Data in Star Trek
  - Arik Soong, great-grandfather of Noonien Soong

== See also ==
- Song (Korean name)
- Brenda Song, b. 1988, 熊 (original surname Xiong (熊; Xyooj in Hmong), but changed their last name to Song when the family immigrated to the United States
- Xirong, ancient people
- Goumang, ancient mascot
