= List of avian humanoids =

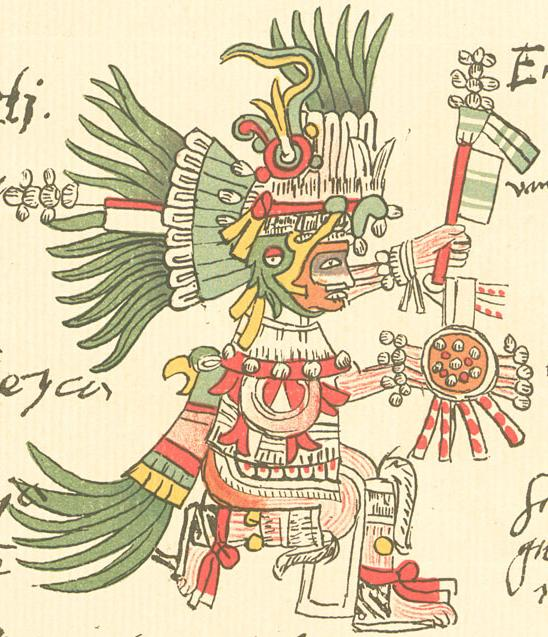
Huitzilopochtli, national god of the Aztecs.

Avian humanoids (people with the characteristics of birds) are a common motif in folklore and popular fiction, mainly found in Greek, Roman, Meitei, Hindu, Persian mythology, etc.

== Folklore ==
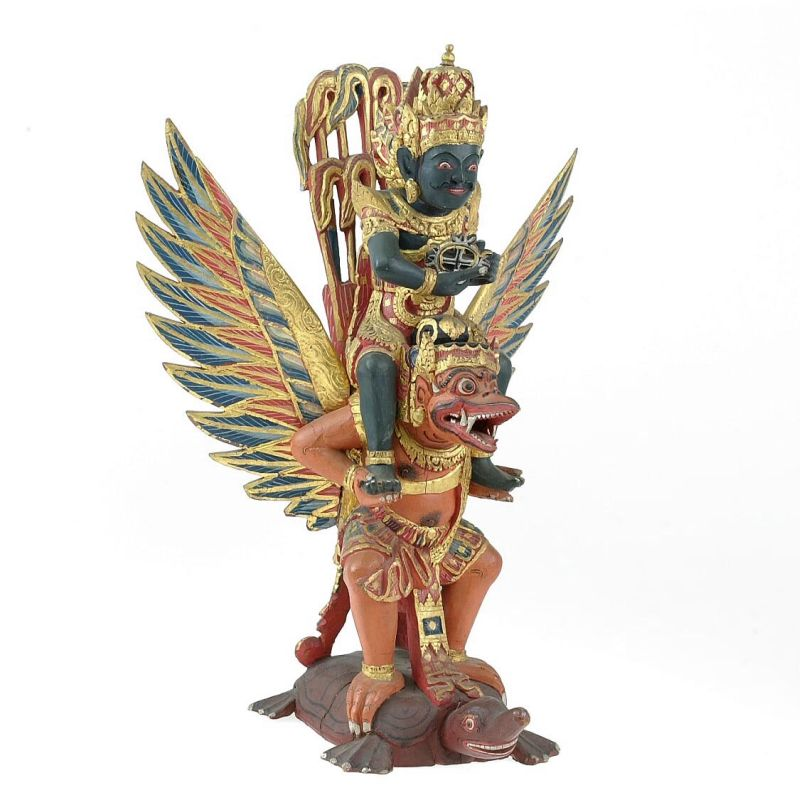
Vishnu riding Garuda

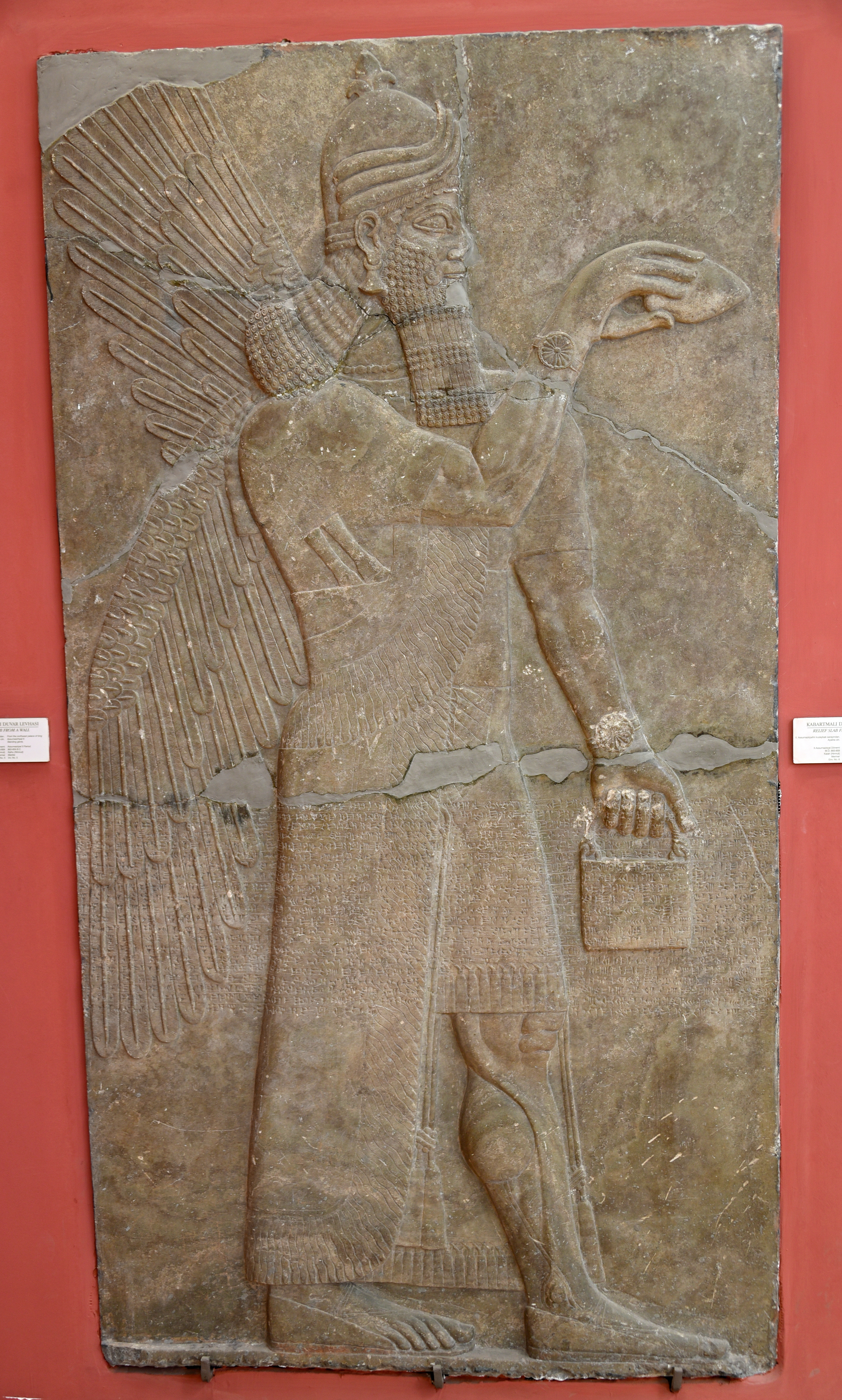
A winged human-headed Apkallu holding a bucket and a pine cone. From Nimrud, Iraq. 883-859 BCE. Ancient Orient Museum, Istanbul

Horus with the head of a falcon

- Alkonost from Russian mythology, a bird with a woman's head.
- Almost all of the Anemoi (Boreas, Eurus, Zephyrus, Notus, etc.), most prominently in their depiction on the Tower of the Winds.
- Angels in all Abrahamic religions, most prominently in artistic depictions.
- Anzû from Mesopotamian mythology, either a lesser divinity or a monster.
- Arke, Iris' sister who had wings said to be iridescent.
- The Ba, the part of a human's soul that roughly represents its personality, depicted as a bird with a human head.
- Calais and Zetes, the sons of the North Wind Boreas.
- Chareng, also called Uchek Langmeidong, a mythical creature from Meitei mythology that is part-human and part-hornbill, having an avian body and a human head.
- Cupid is often depicted as winged.
- The Ekek from Philippine mythology is depicted as a humanoid with bird wings and a beak.
- Eos is often depicted as winged in art.
- Ereshkigal, the goddess of Kur, the land of the dead or underworld in Sumerian mythology.
- Eris was depicted as winged in ancient Greek art.
- The Faravahar of Zoroastrianism.
- Gamayun from Russian mythology, a large bird with a woman's head.
- The Garuda, an eagle-man mount of Vishnu in Hindu mythology who is depicted as a class of bird-like beings in Buddhist mythology.
- Geryon, a giant defeated by Hercules who, in one account, was described as having wings. In addition, some mid-sixth-century Chalcidian vases portray him as winged.
- Harpies, bird-women in Greek mythology associated with storm winds and known for terrorizing mortals.
- Henet an Egyptian goddess sometimes depicted as a woman with the head of a Pelican.
- Horus from ancient Egyptian mythology and several of his various forms were often depicted with body parts of a Falcon.
- Huitzilopochtli ("hummingbird's south" or "hummingbird's left") Aztec god of the sun and war who was often depicted as either a hummingbird or an eagle.
- Inanna, Mesopotamian goddess of war, love, and fertility.
- Iris was said to have golden wings, with "golden-winged" being one of her epithets, and was often depicted in art as having wings.
- Isis and her sister Nephthys were ancient Egyptian goddesses commonly depicted with Kite heads or wings attached to their arms.
- Karura in Japanese folklore, divine creatures with a human torso and a birdlike head.
- Khenti-kheti, an Egyptian god sometimes depicted as a falcon-headed man with Bull horns.
- Khonsu, an Egyptian moon god often depicted as a man with the head of a falcon.
- The Kinnara and Kinnari in southeast Asia are two of the most beloved mythological characters. They are benevolent half-human, half-bird creatures who watch over humanity.
- Kurangaituku is a supernatural being in Māori mythology who is part-woman and part-bird.
- Lamassu from Mesopotamian mythology, a winged tutelary deity with a human head, the body of a bull or a lion, and bird wings.
- Lei Gong, a Chinese thunder god often depicted as a bird man.
- Mandulis, a Nubian God usually depicted as a falcon with the head of a man.
- Morpheus, the son of Hypnos and a god of dreams.
- Montu, an Egyptian war god often depicted as a man with the head of a falcon.
- Neith, an Egyptian goddess sometimes depicted with bird wings attached to her arms.
- Nemesis was described as winged by Mesomedes, and is often portrayed as such in art.
- Nightingale the Robber in Slavic folklore, who is killed by the hero Ilya Muromets.
- Nike in Greek mythology is described as having birdlike wings.
- Pamola, a bird-man from Abenaki mythology.
- Peri, beautiful, winged women from Persian folklore.
- Qebehsenuef one of the "Four sons of Horus" of Egyptian mythology depicted as a mummified man with a falcon head.
- Qebui, Henkhisesui, Shehbui, and Ḥutchai the Egyptian gods of the north, east, south and west winds respectively, all depicted with four bird wings.
- Ra, an ancient Egyptian sun god often depicted with a falcon's head.
- Rekhyt, an ethnic group and later-god from Egyptian mythology was depicted as a lapwing sometimes with human arms or even as a full person with lapwing wings.
- The Second people of the World in Southern Sierra Miwok mythology.
- Sirens from Greek mythology began as women-bird hybrids, but later evolved to become closer to mermaids.
- Sirin, mythological creatures of Rus' legend based on the original depiction of the Greek sirens.
- Sokar an Egyptian death god depicted with the head of a falcon.
- The Soul of Pe from Egyptian mythology was often depicted with the head of a falcon.
- The Swan maidens in the folktales of cultures such as Sweden, Germany, Romania, Serbia, Japan, and Pakistan.
- Suparnas from Hinduism, who can appear as part man and part bird.
- Tangata manu of Easter Island, often depicted as a frigate bird/human hybrid.
- The Tengu of Japanese folklore, monstrous humanoids who dwell in the mountains and forests and possess the wings, claws, and sometimes beak of a bird.
- Thanatos and his brother Hypnos were often portrayed as winged.
- Thoth, an Egyptian god of knowledge, was portrayed as having the head and sometimes the body of an Ibis.
- Wayland the Smith from Germanic mythology; scholars differ on whether he organically grew wings to escape imprisonment or fashioned artificial ones like Daedalus.
- Winged genie, bearded men with birds' wings who are a recurring motif in Assyrian art.

== Fiction ==
- The Aarakocra and the Kenku, two playable avian humanoid races in the Dungeons & Dragons fantasy roleplaying game.
- The Chozo civilization, a highly intelligent and technologically advanced bird-like species in the Metroid series.
- Turians from the Mass Effect series, a warrior race with avian features.
- The winged people of Normnbdsgrsutt in Robert Paltock's utopian fantasy Peter Wilkins (1750), including Youwarkee, whom Peter marries.
- The Flock from James Patterson's Maximum Ride novel series, who are artificial human-avian hybrids and have wings.
- The bird people of Brontitall, led by The Wise Old Bird, in The Hitchhiker's Guide to the Galaxy. They are depicted by Douglas Adams as evolving from humans who were sick of buying shoes and became bird-like creatures, never setting foot on the ground again.
- The Illyrians from A Court of Thorns And Roses series by Sarah J. Maas, a warrior race of faeries who live in the mountains and have bat-like wings.
- A race of garuda appear in fantasy author China Miéville's world Bas-Lag, as featured in Perdido Street Station.
- A race of magical creatures called Veela appear in J.K. Rowling's Harry Potter series, and are beautiful women who become frightening bird-like creatures when angered.
- Vergere in The New Jedi Order book series, part of the Star Wars expanded universe, is of the Fosh species, whose tears can be used as poison or healing.
- The Rito from The Legend of Zelda are a race of avian humanoids with the ability of flight. In The Wind Waker, they are primarily humanoid and depicted as an evolved form of the aquatic Zora. In Breath of the Wild, they are depicted as more bird-like and not connected to the Zora.
- The Tirkin from the Xenoblade series, a type of enemy who are capable of speech and using tools.
- The High Entia from the Xenoblade series, a humanoid race with wings on the sides of their heads. Some can use these wings to fly; however, hybrid High Entia such as Melia, who is half-Homs, have smaller wings.
- The Shi'ar from Marvel Comics, a species of cold-blooded alien humanoids of avian descent; they resemble humans with feathered crests atop their heads in lieu of hair.
- Birdperson, a character from the television series Rick and Morty, is a tall humanoid with eagle wings who is later renamed "Phoenixperson."
- Prince Vultan's hawkmen from the 1980 space opera film Flash Gordon.
- Arakkoas from the World of Warcraft expansions (first appearing in WoW: Burning Crusade), a race of bird humanoids with avian features.
- Papi, a harpy from the manga series Monster Musume.
- Skellig, the titular character in David Almond's work

== See also ==
- List of piscine and amphibian humanoids
- List of reptilian humanoids
- Insectoids in science fiction and fantasy
