= Song Yi =

Song Yi is the name of:

- Song Yi (Qin dynasty), minister of the rebel Chu kingdom during the Qin dynasty
- Song Yi (field hockey), Chinese field hockey player
- Song Yi (actress), Chinese actress
