= Four Symbols =

Mythological creatures in Chinese constellations

- Clockwise from top left: Black Turtle-Snake of the North, Azure Dragon of the East, Vermilion Bird of the South, and White Tiger of the West

Chinese name
- Chinese: 四象
- Literal meaning: Four Images
Transcriptions
Standard Mandarin
- Hanyu Pinyin: Sì xiàng
Yue: Cantonese
- Yale Romanization: Seijeuhng
- Jyutping: Sei3-zoeng6

Vietnamese name
- Vietnamese alphabet: Tứ tượng
- Chữ Hán: 四象

Korean name
- Hangul: 사상
- Hanja: 四象
Transcriptions
- Revised Romanization: Sasang

Japanese name
- Kanji: 四象
- Hiragana: ししょう
Transcriptions
- Revised Hepburn: Shishō
- Kunrei-shiki: Shishō

Four Gods

Chinese name
- Chinese: 四神
Transcriptions

Vietnamese name
- Vietnamese alphabet: Tứ Thánh Thú
- Chữ Hán: 四聖獣

Korean name
- Hangul: 사신
- Hanja: 四神
Transcriptions
- Revised Romanization: Sasin

Japanese name
- Kanji: 四神
- Hiragana: しじん
Transcriptions
- Revised Hepburn: Shijin
- Kunrei-shiki: Shijin

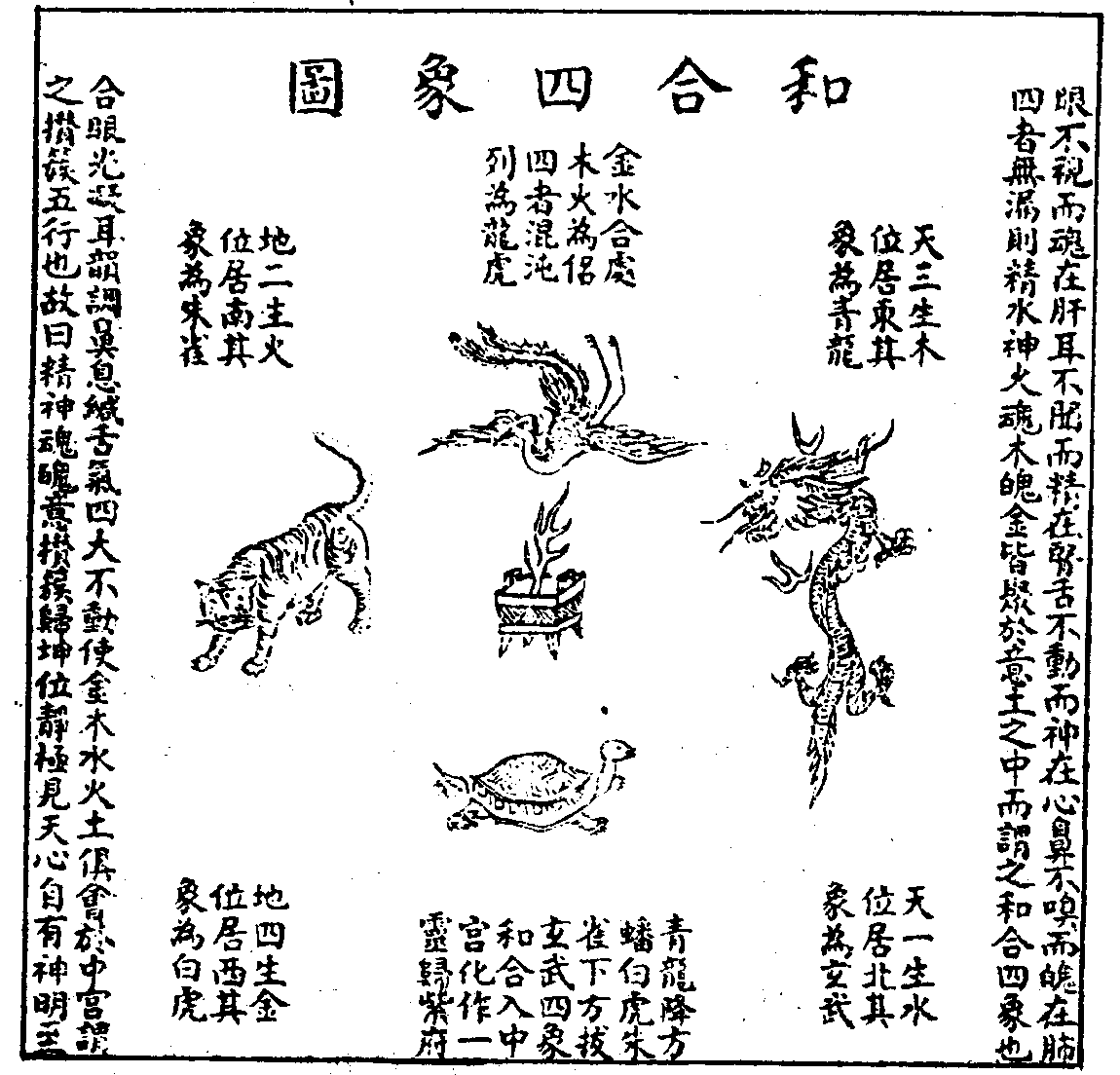
Neidan Illustration of Bringing Together the Four Symbols 和合四象圖, 1615 Xingming guizhi

The Four Symbols are mythological creatures appearing among the Chinese constellations along the ecliptic, and viewed as the guardians of the four cardinal directions. These four creatures are also referred to by a variety of other names, including "Four Guardians", "Four Gods", and "Four Auspicious Beasts".

The members of said group consist of the Azure Dragon of the East, the Vermilion Bird of the South, the White Tiger of the West, and the Black Turtle-Snake (also called "Black Warrior") of the North. Occasionally, they are accompanied by the Yellow Dragon of the Center, but said member is often excluded; in contexts where the Yellow Dragon is included, the groups is referred to as the "Five Symbols", "Five Guardians", "Five Gods", and "Five Auspicious Beasts"

Each of the creatures is most closely associated with a cardinal direction and a color, but also additionally represents other aspects, including a season of the year, an emotion, virtue, and one of the Chinese "five elements" (wood, fire, metal, and water; earth is often represented by the Yellow Dragon instead). Each has been given its own individual traits, origin story and a reason for being. Symbolically, and as part of spiritual and religious belief and meaning, these creatures have been culturally important across countries in the Sinosphere.

== History ==
Depictions of mythological creatures clearly ancestral to the modern set of four creatures have been found throughout China. Currently, the oldest known depiction was found in 1987 in a tomb in Xishuipo in Puyang, Henan, which has been dated to approximately 5300 BC. In the tomb, labeled M45, immediately adjacent to the remains of the main occupant to the east and west were found mosaics made of clam shells and bones forming images closely resembling the Azure Dragon and White Tiger, respectively.

The modern standard configuration was settled much later, with variations appearing throughout Chinese history. For example, the Rong Cheng Shi manuscript recovered in 1994, which dates to the Warring States period (c. 453–221 BCE), gives five directions rather than four and places the animals differently. According to that document, Yu the Great gave directional banners to his people, marked with the following insignia: the north with a bird, the south with a snake, the east with the sun, the west with the moon, and the center with a bear. The Chinese classic Book of Rites mentions the Vermillion Bird, Black Turtle-Snake (Dark Warrior), Azure Dragon, and White Tiger as heraldic animals on war flags; they were the names of asterisms associated with the four cardinal directions: South, North, East, and West, respectively.

In Taoism, the Four Symbols have been assigned human identities and names. The Azure Dragon is named Meng Zhang (孟章), the Vermilion Bird is called Ling Guang (陵光), the White Tiger Jian Bing (監兵), and the Black Turtle-Snake Zhi Ming (執明). Its Japanese equivalent, in corresponding order: Seiryū (east), Suzaku (south), Byakko (west), Genbu (north).

The colours associated with the four creatures can be said to match the colours of soil in the corresponding areas of China: the bluish-grey water-logged soils of the east, the reddish iron-rich soils of the south, the whitish saline soils of the western deserts, the black organic-rich soils of the north, and the yellow soils from the central loess plateau.

== In I Ching ==
The chapter The Great Treatise I (系辞上; 繫辭上; Xì cí shàng) in the I Ching (易经; 易經; 'Classics of Changes') describes the origins of the Four Symbols thus:

易有太極，
是生兩儀，
兩儀生四象，
四象生八卦，

Yì yǒu tàijí，
shì shēng liǎngyí，
liǎngyí shēng sìxiàng
sìxiàng shēng bāguà，

In Change there is the Supreme Polarity (太极; 太極; tàijí; Taiji),
which generates the Two Modes (两仪; 兩儀; liǎngyí; Liangyi).
The Two Modes generate the Four Images (四象; sìxiàng; Sixiang),
and the Four Images generate the Eight Trigrams (八卦; bāguà; Bagua).

== Correspondence with the Five Phases ==
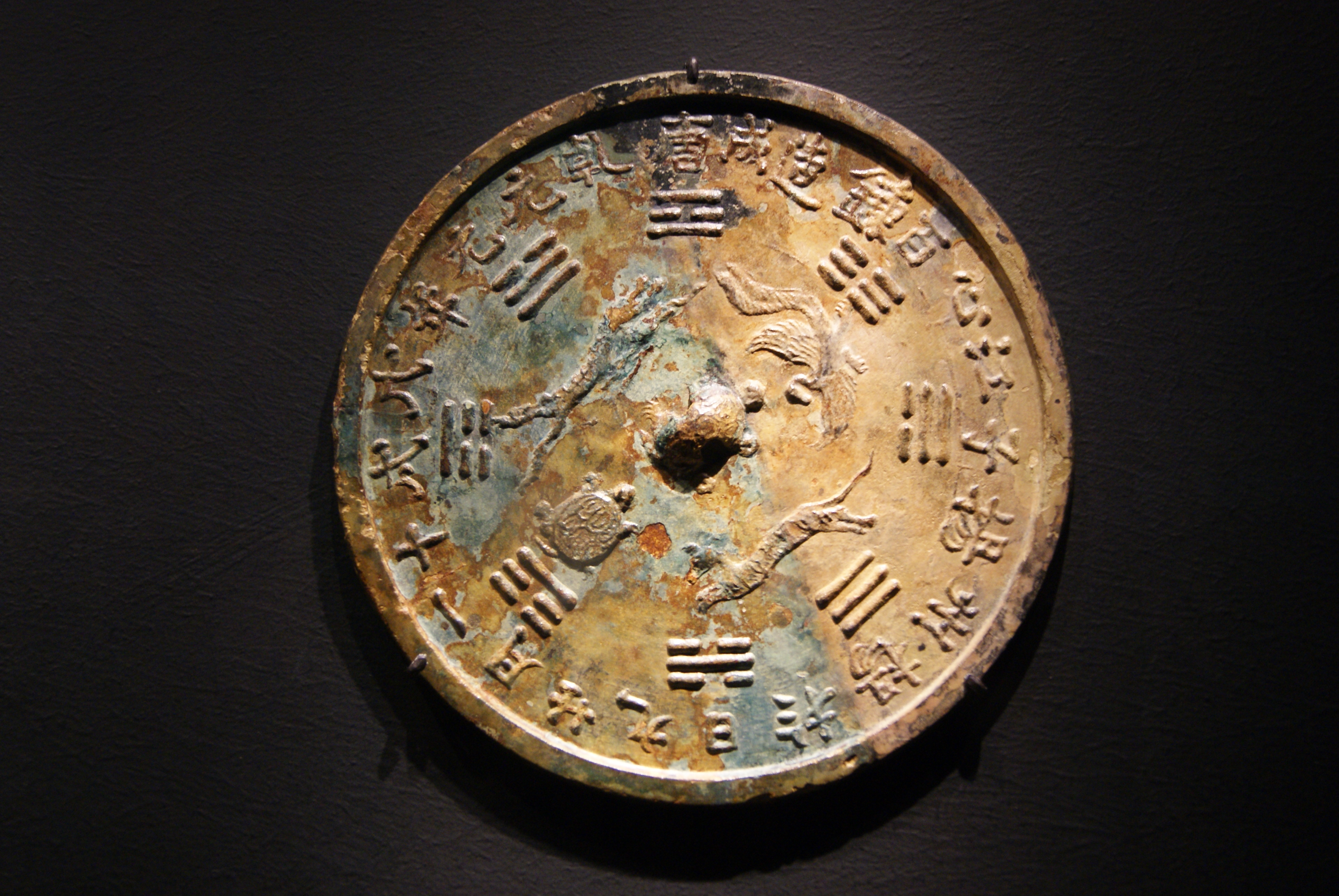
Bronze mirror with cosmological decoration from the Belitung shipwreck, including Bagua and the Four Auspicious Beasts

These mythological creatures have also been syncretized into the Five Phases system (wuxing). The Azure Dragon of the East represents Wood, the Vermilion Bird of the South represents Fire, the White Tiger of the West represents Metal, and the Black Tortoise (or Black Warrior) of the North represents Water. In this system, the fifth principle Earth is represented by the Yellow Dragon of the Center.

Four Auspicious Beasts	Five directions	Four seasons	Times of day	Five colors	Wuxing	Four Symbols	Yao	Five Gods
Azure Dragon	East	Spring	Dawn	Blue (Qing)	Wood	Young yang	少陽 ⚎	Goumang (句芒) / Chong (重)
Vermilion Bird	South	Summer	Midday	Red	Fire	Old yang	老陽 ⚌	Zhurong (祝融) / Li (犁)
White Tiger	West	Autumn	Dusk	White	Metal	Young yin	少陰 ⚍	Rushou (蓐收) / Gai (該)
Black Turtle-Snake	North	Winter	Midnight	Black	Water	Old yin	老陰 ⚏	Xuanming (玄冥) / Xiu & Xi (修 & 熙)
Yellow Dragon or Qilin	Central	Intermediate		Yellow	Earth			Houtu (后土) / Goulong (句龍)

== See also ==
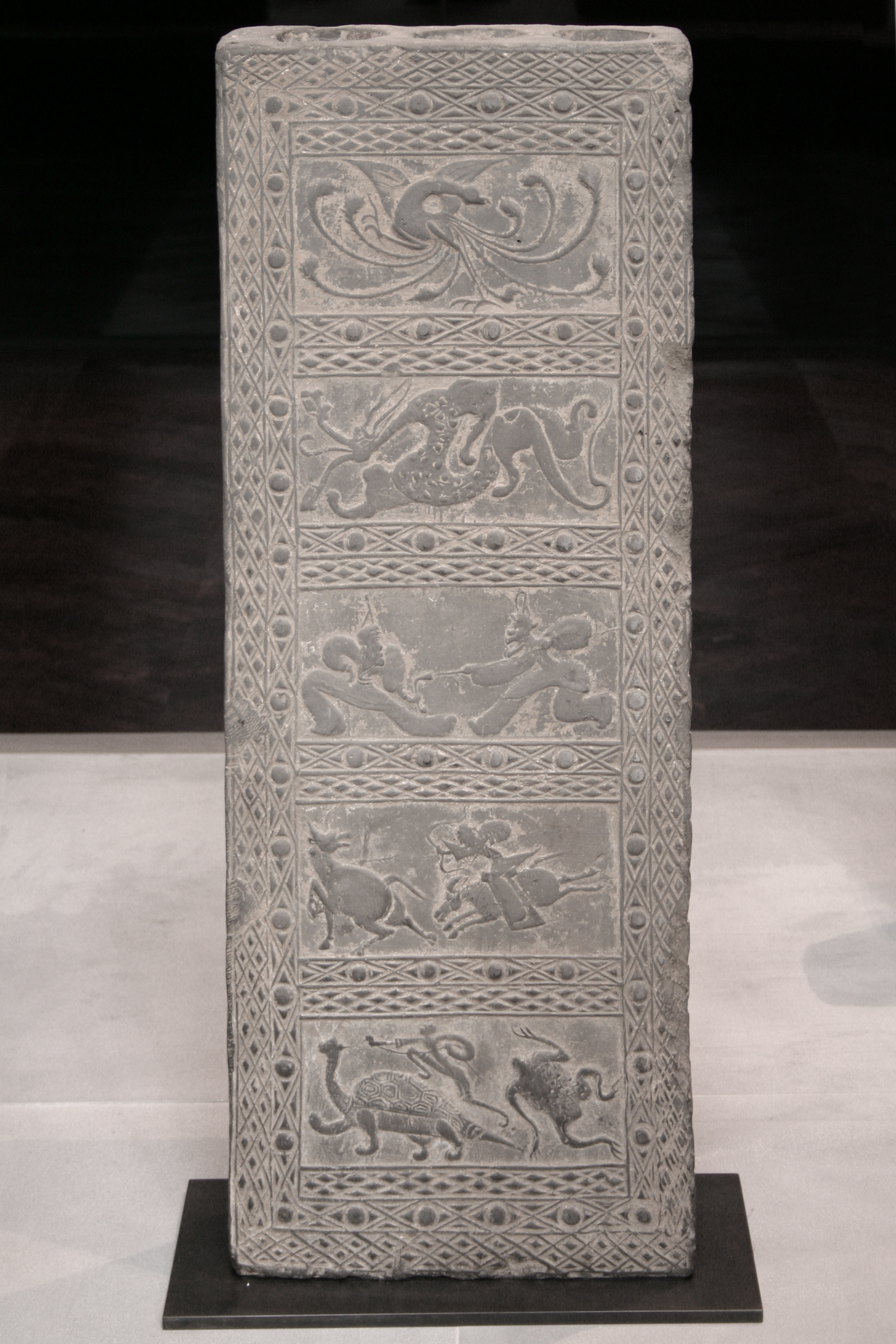
A Han-dynasty pottery tile emblematically representing the five cardinal directions

- Four Heavenly Kings
- Wudaxian
- Guardians of the directions
- Chinese astrology – Astrology based on Chinese astronomy
- Chinese constellations – Celestial groupings used in Chinese astrology
- Color in Chinese culture
- Dragon Kings of the Five Regions – Chinese water and weather deity
- Four Holy Beasts – Four sacred animals in Chinese mythology
- Four Living Creatures – Class of heavenly beings
- Four Mountains – Four deities, heroes or legendary mountains in Chinese mythology
- Four Perils – Four malevolent beings in Chinese mythology
- Four Seas – Metaphorical boundaries of ancient China
- Four temperaments – Proto-psychological theory
- Purple Forbidden enclosure – Chinese historical constellation
- Royal stars – Divine celestial generals commanding the stars in Zoroastrianism
- Tetramorph – Symbolic arrangement of four differing elements
- Wufang Shangdi – Traditional Chinese fivefold deity
