= Li Guyan =

Chinese chancellor

Li Guyan (李固言), courtesy name Zhongshu (仲樞), was an official of the Chinese Tang dynasty, serving two terms as chancellor during the reign of Emperor Wenzong.

== Background and early career ==
It is not clear when Li Guyan was born. His family was from the prominent Li clan of Zhao Commandery (趙郡, in modern Shijiazhuang, Hebei) and traced its ancestry to the Warring States period Zhao general Li Mu. Li Guyan's ancestors later served as officials of the Qin dynasty, Han dynasty, Cao Wei, Jin dynasty (266–420), Former Yan and/or Later Yan, Northern Wei, Northern Qi, Sui dynasty, and the Tang dynasty. His grandfather Li Bing (李并) served as a military officer under a commandant of Yang Prefecture (揚州, in modern Yangzhou, Jiangsu), and his father Li Xian (李峴) served as a county magistrate.

In 812, during the reign of Emperor Xianzong, Li Guyan passed the imperial examinations as the highest scorer in the Jinshi class. Subsequently, he successively served on the staffs of Pei Kan (裴堪) the governor of Jiangxi Circuit (江西, headquartered in modern Nanchang, Jiangxi) and Wang Bo the military governor (Jiedushi) of Xichuan Circuit (西川, headquartered in modern Chengdu, Sichuan). Eventually, he became Hubu Langzhong (戶部郎中), a supervisory official at the ministry of census (戶部, Hubu).

== During Emperor Wenzong's reign ==
Early in the Taihe era (827-835) of Emperor Xianzong's grandson Emperor Wenzong, Li Guyan was, in addition to being Hubu Langzhong, overseeing the miscellaneous affairs at the Office of the Imperial Censors (御史臺, Yushi Tai). In 830, while Li Zongmin — a leader of the Niu Faction in the then-heated Niu-Li Factional Struggles — served as chancellor, Li Zongmin had Li Guyan made an imperial attendant (給事中, Jishizhong).

In 831, when the chancellor Song Shenxi was falsely accused of treason (of wanting to overthrow Emperor Wenzong and replacing him with his brother Li Cou the Prince of Zhang) by the powerful eunuch Wang Shoucheng, Li Guyan was one of the advisory officials who urged that the investigation of the matter be transferred from the eunuch-controlled agencies to the imperial government-controlled agencies. It was said that it was due to the efforts of Li Guyan and his colleagues that Wang finally decided to recommend against death sentences for either Li Cou or Song, to avoid a reinvestigation. Also that year, when the imperial architect Wang Kan (王堪) was delayed in repairing the imperial ancestral temple, Wang Kan was stripped of his salary and set to be made a member of the staff of Emperor Wenzong's son and crown prince, Li Yong. Li Guyan returned the edict to Emperor Wenzong, pointing out that someone who had been guilty should not serve on the crown prince's staff. Wang Kan was thereafter made a teacher to an imperial prince, instead. In 832, Li Guyan was made the deputy minister of public works (工部侍郎, Gongbu Shilang). In 833, he was made Shangshu Zuo Cheng (尚書左丞), one of the secretaries general of the executive bureau of government (尚書省, Shangshu Sheng), and he was put in charge of drafting regulations on meetings between the Pushe (the heads of the executive bureau) and the emperor. In 834, when Li Zongmin's rival and leader of the Li Faction in the Niu-Li Factional struggles, Li Deyu, became chancellor, Li Guyan was sent out of the capital to serve as the prefect of Hua Prefecture (華州, in modern Weinan, Shaanxi).

Later in the year, however, Li Zongmin became chancellor again, and Li Guyan was recalled to serve as the deputy minister of civil service affairs (吏部侍郎, Libu Shilang). In summer 835, he was made chief imperial censor (御史大夫, Yushi Daifu). Soon thereafter, Li Zongmin offended Emperor Wenzong over his attempt to defend the official Yang Yuqing (楊虞卿) against imperial wrath and was demoted and exiled. Li Guyan was made chancellor (with the designation Tong Zhongshu Menxia Pingzhangshi (同中書門下平章事)), as well as Menxia Shilang (門下侍郎), the deputy head of the examination bureau (門下省, Menxia Sheng), to replace Li Zongmin. It was said that Li Guyan was only made chancellor because Emperor Wenzong's close associates Li Xun and Zheng Zhu, whose machinations led to Li Zongmin's exile, wanted to put on a display of fairness. In fall 835, Zheng, as part of a plot he was forming with Emperor Wenzong and Li Xun to slaughter the eunuchs, sought to be the military governor of Fengxiang Circuit (鳳翔, headquartered in modern Baoji, Shaanxi). When Li Guyan opposed, Emperor Wenzong simultaneously commissioned Li Guyan to be the military governor of Shannan West Circuit (山南西道, headquartered in modern Hanzhong, Shaanxi) and Zheng to be the military governor of Fengxiang. Li Xun was made chancellor to replace Li Guyan.

After Emperor Wenzong's plot with Li Xun and Zheng (later known as the Ganlu Incident) failed in late 835, with the eunuchs slaughtering a large number of officials, including Li Xun, Zheng, and Li Xun's fellow chancellors Wang Ya, Jia Su, and Shu Yuanyu, Emperor Wenzong came to miss Li Guyan. In spring 836, he recalled Li Guyan from Shannan West to again serve as chancellor and Menxia Shilang. Soon after becoming chancellor again, he concurred (along with Zheng Tan) in his colleague Li Shi's petition seeking to posthumously restore Song's reputation, and Emperor Wenzong agreed, posthumously restoring Song's titles. In 837, there was a discussion between Emperor Wenzong and the chancellors, in which Li Guyan advocated the merits of commissioning officials according to their abilities, rather than seniority. In 837, Li Guyan was sent out to serve as the military governor of Xichuan Circuit (西川, headquartered in modern Chengdu, Sichuan), continuing to carry the Tong Zhongshu Menxia Pingzhangshi title as an honorary title, as well as the mayor of its capital Chengdu. to replace Yang Sifu, who was named chancellor.

== After Emperor Wenzong's reign ==
After Emperor Wenzong's death and succession by his younger brother Emperor Wuzong in 840, Li Guyan was recalled from Xichuan to serve as You Pushe (右僕射), one of the heads of the executive bureau, but soon thereafter was sent out of the capital Chang'an again to serve the military governor of Hezhong Circuit (河中, headquartered in modern Yuncheng, Shanxi). At that time, the bridge over the Yellow River between the two parts of Hezhong had been damaged by a flood, and the Hezhong Circuit officials were setting up a ferry between the parts of Hezhong but charging tolls for it. When Li Guyan arrived, he ordered that the collection be stopped. When Emperor Wuzong subsequently waged a campaign against the Uyghur Empire and ordered the circuits to submit wealth to support it, Li Guyan advised against it, but Emperor Wuzong did not listen to him. Subsequently, he was, on account of illness, made an advisor to the Crown Prince. He was later made the defender of the eastern capital Luoyang.

Early in the reign of Emperor Wuzong's uncle Emperor Xuānzong, Li Guyan was again made You Pushe. He later was made a senior advisor to the Crown Prince but ordered to have his office at Luoyang. He died sometime thereafter, and was given posthumous honors.

It was said that Li Guyan often stuttered while speaking, and was not good with receiving guests. However, when he spoke on policy matters before the emperor, he was able to analyze the matters well.
