= Li Cou =

Li Cou (Chinese: 李湊; died February 10, 835), formally Crown Prince Huaiyi (懷懿太子), was an imperial prince of the Chinese Tang dynasty who became implicated in an alleged plot that the chancellor Song Shenxi was supporting him to be emperor. He was, as a result, demoted by his brother Emperor Wenzong. After his death, Emperor Wenzong, coming to believe that the allegations were false, posthumously honored him as crown prince.

== Background ==
It is not known when Li Cou was born — but as his youngest known older brother, Li Han (the later Emperor Wenzong), was born in 809, and his eldest known younger brother Li Rong was born in 812, he must have been born between these points. He was the sixth son of Emperor Muzong, although the identity of his mother had been lost to history. He was said to be mild in temperament and appropriate in his behavior in his youth. In 821, when Emperor Muzong created his sons, as well as a number of younger brothers who had not been created titles, imperial princes, Li Cou was created the Prince of Zhang.

== The Song Shenxi incident ==
By 831, an older brother of Li Cou's, Emperor Wenzong, was emperor. Emperor Wenzong, apprehensive of how much control the powerful eunuchs had on his government at the time, had been planning with the chancellor Song Shenxi a way to eliminate the powerful eunuchs. As part of the plan, Song recommended Wang Fan (王璠) to be the mayor of Jingzhao Municipality (京兆, i.e., the region of the capital Chang'an) and informed him of the plan. Wang Fan, instead, leaked the plan, and the powerful eunuch Wang Shoucheng and Wang Shoucheng's strategist Zheng Zhu learned of the plan. Zheng reacted by ordering the Shence Army officer Doulu Zhu (豆盧著) to falsely accuse Song of plotting treason to put Li Cou on the throne. When Wang Shoucheng relayed the accusation to Emperor Wenzong, Emperor Wenzong believed it and was angry. Wang Shoucheng initially wanted to take this opportunity to massacre Song's household, but was stopped by another powerful eunuch, Ma Cunliang (馬存亮). However, during the subsequent investigations by Shence Army officers, after an attendant official to the imperial princes, Yan Jingze (晏敬則), and Song's associate Wang Shiwen (王師文) were tortured and confessed to serving as conduits for messages between Song and Li Cou, Song was found to be guilty and was set to be executed. The advisorial officials Cui Xuanliang (崔玄亮), Li Guyan, Wang Zhi (王質), Lu Jun (盧均), Shu Yuanbao (舒元褒), Jiang Xi (蔣係), Pei Xiu (裴休), and Wei Wen (韋溫) urged caution, however, believed there were substantial questions in the matter and urged a reinvestigation by imperial government officials. The chancellor Niu Sengru also took the same view. Zheng, fearing that a reinvestigation would lead to discovery of the truth, suggested to Wang Shoucheng that he recommend to Emperor Wenzong that neither Song nor Li Cou be executed. Li Cou was thus demoted to the title of Duke of Chao County (巢縣, in modern Chaohu, Anhui) while Song was demoted to be the military advisor to the prefect of Kai Prefecture (開州, in modern Chongqing). (There was suggestion in Li Cou's biography in the Old Book of Tang that Li Cou might have been ordered to report to Chao County and given 10 houses there, although the edict assured that there would be no additional punishment (e.g., forced suicide) coming.)

== Aftermaths ==
In 835, Li Cou died, and was posthumously created the Prince of Qi. In 836, after Emperor Wenzong came to believe that Song Shenxi was innocent of wrongdoing, he ordered Song's posthumous rehabilitation. In 838, he further ordered that Li Cou be posthumously honored Crown Prince Huaiyi.

== Notes and references ==
- Old Book of Tang, vol. 175.
- New Book of Tang, vol. 82.
- Zizhi Tongjian, vols. 241, 244, 245, 246.
