= Yellow Dragon =

Figure in Chinese religion and mythology

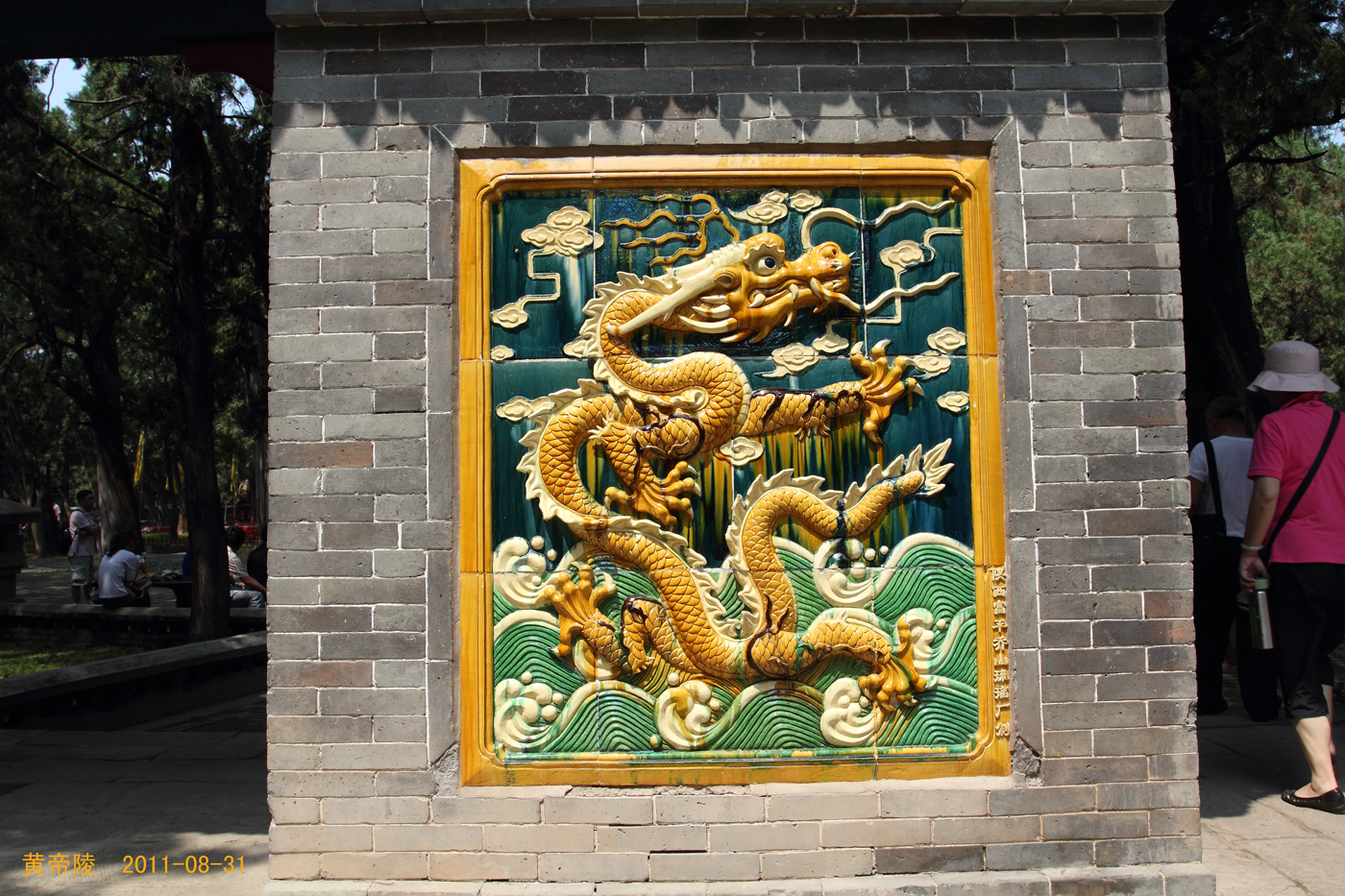
A Yellow Dragon mural on one of the walls at the Mausoleum of the Yellow Emperor.

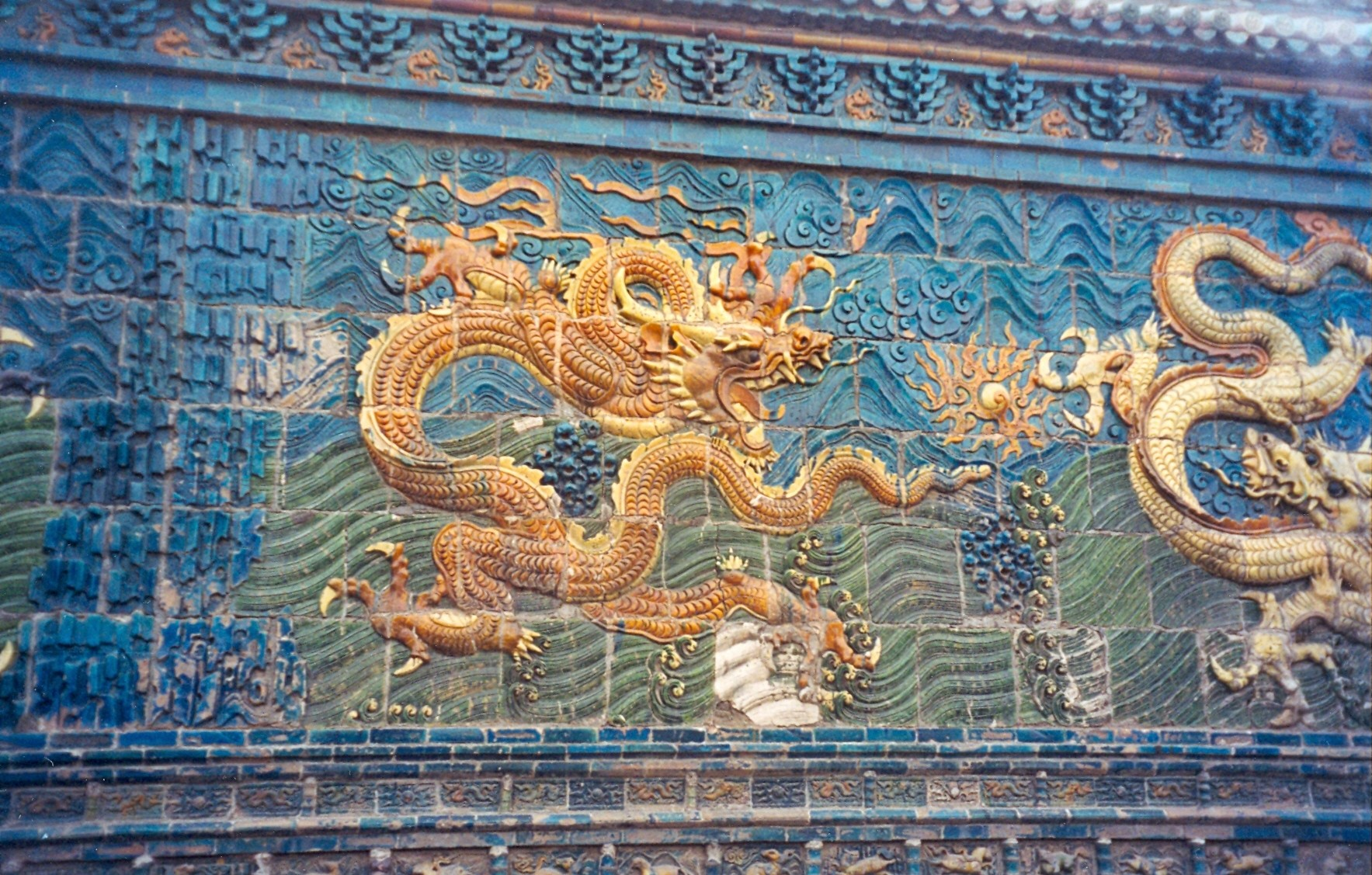
A Yellow Dragon on the Nine Dragon Screen from Datong, Shanxi, China.

The Yellow Dragon (simplified Chinese: 黄龙; traditional Chinese: 黃龍; pinyin: Huánglóng; Cantonese Yale: Wong4 Lung4) is the zoomorphic incarnation of the Yellow Emperor of the center of the universe in Chinese religion and mythology.

The Yellow Emperor or Yellow Deity was conceived by Fubao, who became pregnant after seeing a yellow ray of light turning around the Northern Dipper (in Chinese theology the principal symbol of God). Twenty-four months later, the Yellow Emperor was born and was associated with the color yellow because it is the color of the earth (地; Dì), the material substance in which he incarnated.

The Yellow Dragon is a part of Wuxing and the Four Symbols as the embodiment of the element of earth.

== Myths of Fuxi and Huangdi ==
According to legends, the Yellow Dragon already manifested hornless to Fuxi, emerging from the River Luo, and instructed him with the elements of writing. When he appeared before Fuxi, he filled a hole in the sky made by the monster Gonggong.

The Yellow Emperor was said to have turned into the form of the Yellow Dragon at the end of his life to ascend to Heaven. Since the Chinese consider him to be their ancestor, they sometimes refer to themselves as "children of the dragon" (also see: Nine sons of the dragon). This legend also contributed towards the use of the Chinese dragon as a symbol of imperial power.

The Chinese national flag from 1889 to 1912 is also called the Yellow Dragon Flag (黄龙旗; 黃龍旗; huánglóng qí).

== Other uses ==
In East Asian culture, the Yellow Dragon is the fifth symbol completing the Sixiang (Four Symbols). This deity is the center of the cosmos and it represents the element earth, the Chinese quintessence, as well as the changing of the seasons.

The Yellow Dragon does not appear in native Japanese mythology. The fifth element in the Buddhist elemental system is the void, so there cannot be an animal representing it. However, some consider the Ōryū as the Japanese counterpart of the Yellow Dragon since they share some similarities.

== See also ==
- Four Symbols
- Azure Dragon
- Yinglong
- Dragon Kings of the Five Regions
