= Alkonost =

Mythical bird from Russian folklore

Ivan Bilibin's Alkonost

The Alkonost (Russian: Алконост) is a legendary woman-headed bird in Russian folklore, related to the Sirin.

== Origins and name ==
It possibly originated from Xrafstar in Persian folklore.

== Description ==
The Alkonost is often seen as the foil to another bird woman, the Sirin. They are consistently depicted together. The Alkonost often symbolizes positive things like happiness and paradise, while the Sirin tends to symbolize negative forces like natural disasters and misfortune. Both creatures are associated with foretelling or causing death. The Alkonost, along with many other mythological bird human hybrids, is said to live in Rai, where the dead live.

The Alkonost sings beautiful songs, and those who hear these songs forget everything they know and want nothing more ever again. The Alkonost lays her eggs on a beach and then rolls them into the sea. During the time when the eggs are in the ocean, there are no storms or disasters. However, when the eggs hatch, the hatching causes very violent storms.

The Alkonost became a popular figure when Christianity was introduced in Russia, as the Alkonost was believed to be a messenger from God meant to take away the pain of hardship. Alternately, the Alkonost was used to represent the human soul ascending to Heaven.

According to folk tales, on the morning of the Apple Feast of the Saviour, the Sirin flies into the apple orchard and cries sadly. In the afternoon, the Alkonost flies to this place, beginning to rejoice and laugh. The Alkonost brushes dew from her wings, granting healing powers to all fruits on the tree she is sitting on.

== Gallery ==
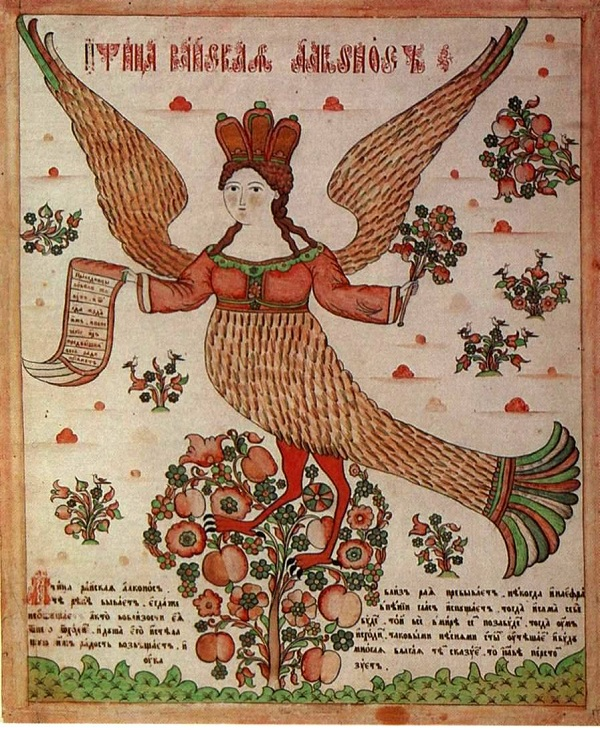
Lubok print, 19th century

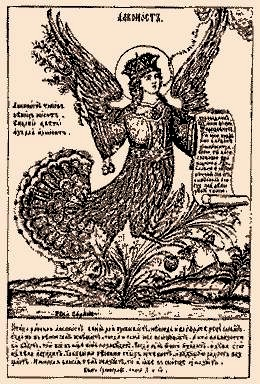
Postcard, 1908

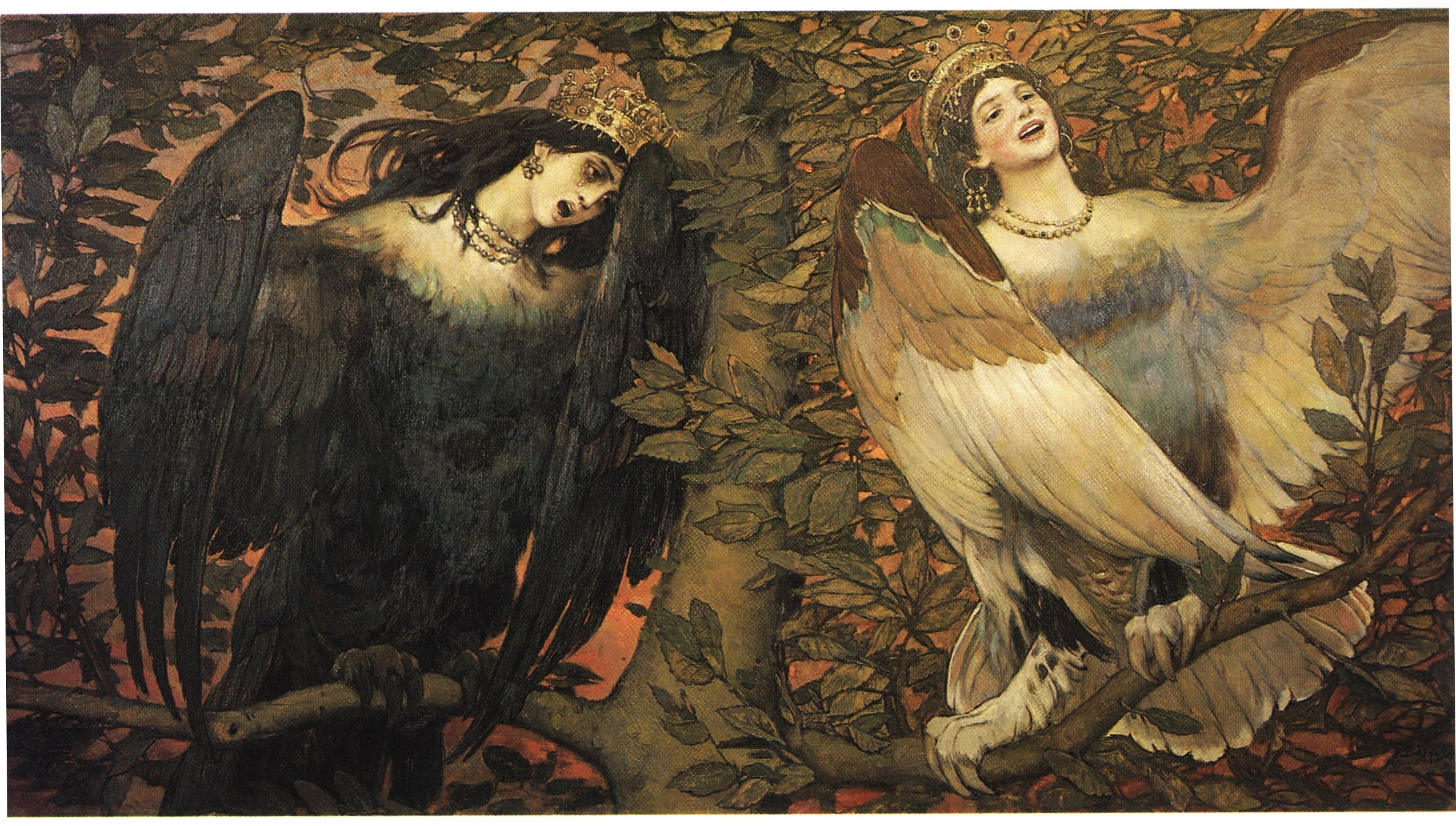
Viktor Vasnetsov's Sirin (left) and Alkonost (right) Birds of Joy and Sorrow, 1896

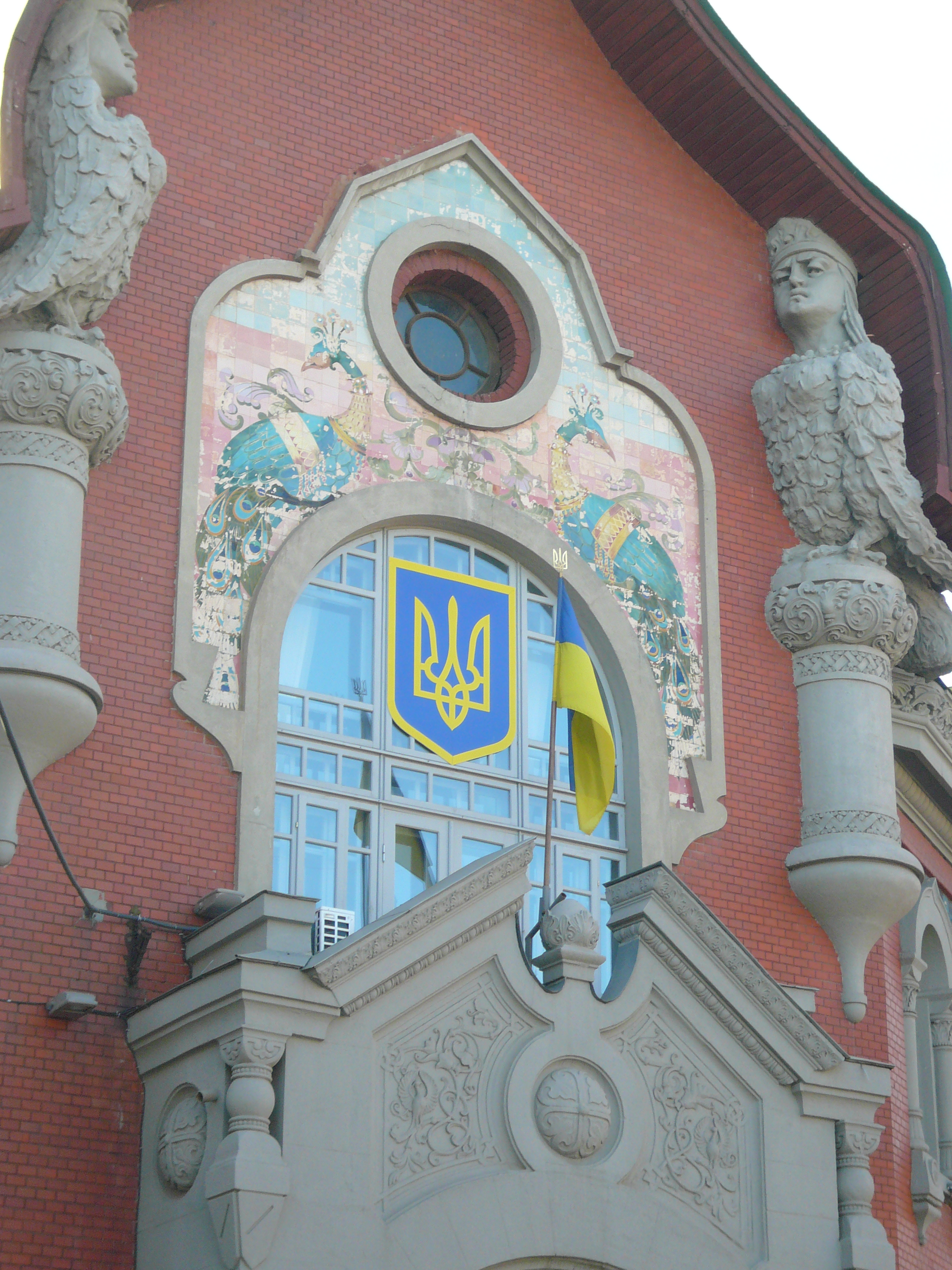
Alkonosts on frontage of the House of Noble and Peasant Bank in Poltava, Ukraine (1906–1909, burned in 1943, restored in 1948)

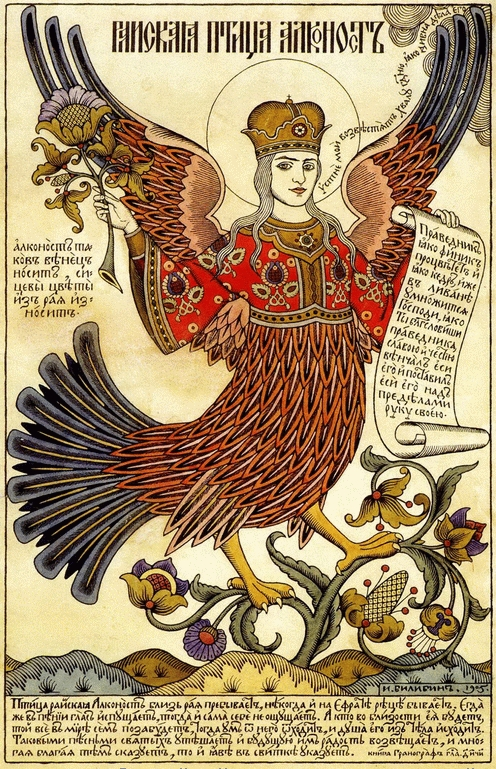
Alkonost by Ivan Bilibin (1905)

== In popular culture ==
- Alkonost is the name of a publishing house founded by Samuil Mironovich Alyansky. It was active in the Silver Age of Russian Poetry between the two world wars. The publishing house published a number of classic avant garde poems and books as well as the literary alminac Zapiski Mechtatelei (dreamers note’s).
- The Alkonost is a minor character from the opera The Legend of the Invisible City of Kitezh and the Maiden Fevroniya
- Alkonost is featured in the digital card game Mythgard (2019) as a rare minion in the Dreni faction.
- Croatian singer Nina Kraljić that performed at the Eurovision Song Contest 2016 sings under the name of Alkonost of Balkan.
- Alkonost is a Russian epic folk metal band formed in Naberezhnye Chelny, Tatarstan, Russia in 1995.

== See also ==
- Gamayun
- Harpy
- Sirin
- Uchek Langmeitong
