= Goumang =

Chinese deity

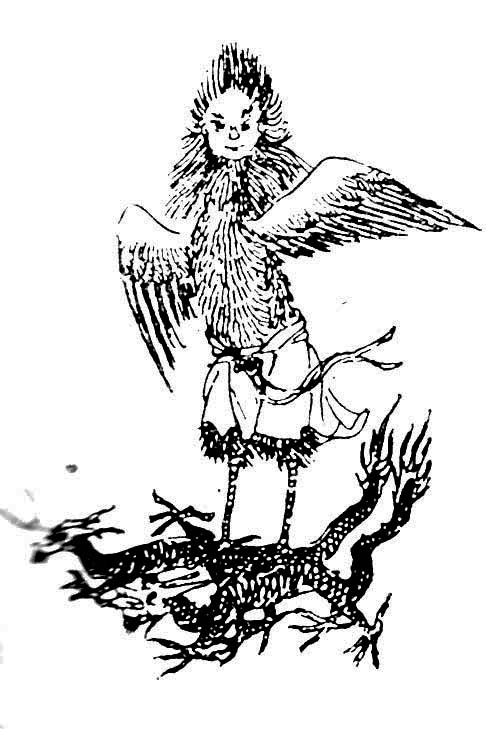
Goumang

Goumang, also known as Jumang (句芒), is an auxiliary god of the Fuxi family. The Classic of Mountains and Seas described his appearance as "having a human face and a bird's body, riding on two dragons". He is the god of wood and spring, in charge of life and health.

== Legend ==
According to myth, he invented the luo, a net for catching birds. Goumang is the descendant of Shaohao (少昊), the god who reigns over the western region, but he assists Fuxi，also known as Taihao to reign over the eastern region and the spring season. However, in some versions, Goumang is a title for the officer of wood, instead of being a special deity. He is said to be the offspring of the god Shaohao (少昊), and his name is Zhong/Chong (different from the god Zhong who separated the heaven from the earth). He assists Fuxi, who takes wood as the emblem of his reign, to rule the eastern region and the season of spring. According to legend, the kingdom of Fuxi and Goumang is in the most east of the world, where the sun rises. Here is an endless green forest with the huge sacred tree, Fusang, growing. The circumference of the kingdom ruled by Taihao and Goumang is 12,000 li (about 6,000 kilometers).

Goumang is also the god in charge of life. There is a story recorded in Mozi. Zheng Mugong, a monarch during the Spring and Autumn period and Warring States period, met a god who had a bird head at noon one day. Zheng Mugong was terrified when he saw this god and wanted to escape. The gods said to him, "don’t be afraid, the emperor of heaven knows that you are a moral monarch", so he ordered me to increase your lifespan by 19 years. As long as the country is strong and there are more and more subjects under your rule, you and your family will not lose the country. Zheng Mugong knelt to the god and asked about the god's name. The god replied, I am Goumang.

Goumang, or Kou Mang, means "Hook sprout", has a bird's body and a human face, and he rides on two dragons. There is the Country of distressed folk who take the name "Hook" as their family name. There is someone a called Wang Hai. He is holding a bird with both hands and is eating its head. Wang Hai is a mythical figure of the early Shang dynasty, known through a list of kings' names as the seventh king of the Shang.

== See also ==
- Gamayun
