= Xrafstar =

Zoroastrianism term for harmful or repulsive animals

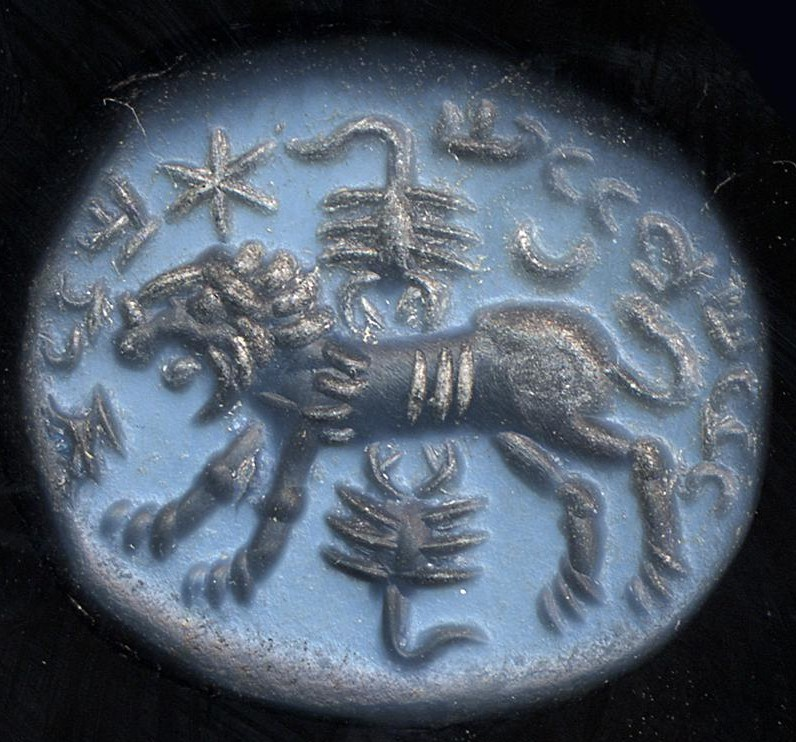
Onyx stamp seal depicting a standing lion attacked by scorpions, with a Middle Persian inscription reading "Reliance on the gods", circa 4th century

Xrafstar or Khrafstra (Avestan: xrafstra-; Middle Persian: xrafstar) is a cover term in Zoroastrianism for the animals that are harmful or repulsive. These animals were not to be sacrificed or eaten. They were considered creations of the Evil Spirit Angra Mainyu and killing them was seen as meritorious. In the Young Avesta and Middle Persian texts, the class of xrafstars includes frogs, reptiles, scorpions and insects like ants or wasps, whereas predators such as the wolf are not referred to as xrafstars, even though they too are considered to be creations of evil.

Herodotus narrates about the practice of killing xrafstars among the Magi: "The Magi are a very peculiar race, different entirely from the Egyptian priests, and indeed from all other men whatsoever. The Egyptian priests make it a point of religion not to kill any live animals except those which they offer in sacrifice. The Magi, on the contrary, kill animals of all kinds with their own hands, excepting dogs and men. They even seem to take a delight in the employment, and kill, as readily as they do other animals, ants and snakes, and such like flying or creeping things". However, it is noteworthy that Greek sources on Persian culture were often biased and slanderous, led by strong Greco-Persian rivalry. Herodotus in particular has gained a reputation for being untrustworthy by scholars, with ancient historian Paul Cartledge going so far as to declare his work "the very denial of official history."

== Bibliography ==
- Boyce, Mary (1979). Zoroastrians. London: Routledge.
- Moazami, Mahnaz (2015). "Mammals iii. The Classification of Mammals and the Other Animal Classes according to Zoroastrian Tradition". Encyclopædia Iranica.
