= Song Shenxi =

Song Shenxi (Chinese: 宋申錫) (died August 18, 833), courtesy name Qingchen (慶臣), was an official of the Chinese Tang dynasty, serving briefly as a chancellor during the reign of Emperor Wenzong. He was most known for planning with Emperor Wenzong to eliminate the power of the eunuchs from the court but then being falsely implicated in a plot to overthrow Emperor Wenzong and replace the emperor with Emperor Wenzong's brother Li Cou, the Prince of Zhang. As a result, Song was exiled and died in exile.

== Background ==
It is not known when Song Shenxi was born, and, while his family was listed as "the Songs of Guangping" (廣平, in modern Handan, Hebei) in the table of the chancellors' family trees in the New Book of Tang, Song's biography in the New Book of Tang indicated that his family's origin had been lost to history. It is known that his grandfather was named Song Su (宋素) and that his father was named Song Shuye (宋叔夜).

== Early career ==
Song Shenxi was said to have lost his father early in life and was poor, but capable in literature. After he passed the imperial examinations in the Jinshi (進士) class, he was made a copyeditor (校書郎, Xiaoshu Lang) at the Palace Library. When the chancellor Wei Guanzhi lost the favor of Emperor Xianzong and was sent out of the capital Chang'an to serve as the governor of Hunan Circuit (湖南, headquartered in modern Changsha, Hunan) in 816 for his opposition to the wars that Emperor Xianzong was waging against warlords, he invited Song to serve as a secretary, and it was said that thereafter Song successively served under regional governors.

== During Emperor Muzong's and Emperor Jingzong's reigns ==
Early in the Changqing era (821-824) of Emperor Xianzong's son Emperor Muzong, Song Shenxi was made Jiancha Yushi (監察御史), a low-level imperial censor. In 822, he was made an imperial chronicler (起居舍人, Qiju Sheren). In 826, by which time Emperor Muzong's son Emperor Jingzong was emperor, he was made Libu Yuanwailang (禮部員外郎), a low-level official at the ministry of rites (禮部, Libu), and was soon given the additional title as an assistant imperial scholar (翰林侍講學士, Hanlin Shijiang Xueshi). It was said that Song was careful and nonpartisan in his actions, contrary to the partisanship that was rampant among the imperial officials at the time, and that it was thought that his promotions would encourage others to follow his example.

== During Emperor Wenzong's reign ==
After Emperor Jingzong was assassinated around the new year 827 and was succeeded by his younger brother Emperor Wenzong, Song Shenxi was made Hubu Langzhong (戶部郎中), a supervisory official at the ministry of census (戶部, Hubu), and was also put in charge of drafting edicts. In 828, he was made Zhongshu Sheren (中書舍人), a mid-level official at the legislative bureau of government (中書省, Zhongshu Sheng), as well as full imperial scholar (翰林學士, Hanlin Xueshi).

At that time, Emperor Wenzong feared the power the eunuchs held, particularly as he believed them to be responsible for the deaths of his grandfather Emperor Xianzong and brother Emperor Jingzong. At that time, Wang Shoucheng was particularly powerful due to his command of the imperial Shence Army (神策軍), and his associate Zheng Zhu was openly accepting bribes in exchange for official commissions, drawing much displeasure from Emperor Wenzong. Emperor Wenzong believed Song to be faithful and careful, and believed he could discuss this matter with Song. On one occasion when Song had a private audience with Emperor Wenzong, Emperor Wenzong discussed the matter of Wang, and told Song to try to form a group of imperial officials who could work together on removing Wang from power, promising to make him chancellor. Soon thereafter in 830, Song was made Shangshu Zuo Cheng (尚書左丞), one of the secretaries general of the executive bureau (尚書省, Shangshu Sheng), and then was made a chancellor de facto with the designation Tong Zhongshu Menxia Pingzhangshi (同中書門下平章事). It was said that because of Song's reputation, there was much public expectation for him as a chancellor, but he was not actually all that capable in his acts.

As part of Emperor Wenzong's and Song's plans to eliminate the eunuchs' power, in 831, Song recommended Wang Fan (王璠) to be the mayor of Jingzhao Municipality (京兆, i.e., the Chang'an region) and secretly informed Wang Fan of Emperor Wenzong's plans. However, Wang Fan then leaked it, and Wang Shoucheng and Zheng became aware of it. In response, Zheng had the Shence Army officer Doulu Zhuo (豆盧著) falsely accuse Song and Emperor Wenzong's brother Li Cou the Prince of Zhang of plotting to overthrow Emperor Wenzong and replace him with Li Cou. When Wang Shoucheng then reported Doulu's accusations to Emperor Wenzong, Emperor Wenzong was shocked and believed it to be true, and immediately ordered investigations. Wang Shoucheng wanted to send Shence Army soldiers to immediately slaughter Song's household, but at the urging of the eunuch Ma Cunliang (馬存亮), this immediate slaughter was not carried out. Rather, Emperor Wenzong ordered that the chancellors immediately be summoned. When the chancellors — Song, Lu Sui, Li Zongmin, and Niu Sengru — arrived at the palace gate, a eunuch announced, "Song Shenxi is not summoned!" Song realized that he was being accused of a crime, and, after knocking his writing board on his head, withdrew back to his household to await punishment. When he arrived at his mansion, his wife asked him, "You, Lord, are a chancellor, the pinnacle of what a subject can reach. Why do you wrong the Son of Heaven and rebel?" He responded, "My entire life I have received the emperor's grace, and I was promoted to be chancellor. I could not remove the wicked and was instead accused by them. You, Lady, should know that I, Song Shenxi, am no rebel." They wept together.

Meanwhile, the other chancellors entered Yanying Hall (延英殿), where Emperor Wenzong showed them Wang Shoucheng's report. The chancellors, shocked, stood there without words. Meanwhile, Emperor Wenzong ordered Wang Shoucheng to arrest the other alleged plotters listed by Doulu's accusation — Li Cou's eunuch Yan Jingze (晏敬則) and Song's attendant Wang Shiwen (王師文), for interrogation inside the palace. Yan was arrested, but Wang Shiwen initially fled.

Two days later, Song was demoted to be a staff member of the crown prince. No one dared to openly state that Song was falsely accused, although the mayor of Jingzhao, Cui Guan (崔琯), and the chief judge of the supreme court Wang Zhengya (王正雅) both submitted petitions that the arrested individuals be transferred to the jurisdiction of the proper governmental authorities rather than be held inside the palace — and it was said that it was because of this that the situation did not escalate. Meanwhile, under interrogation, Yan stated that Song had sent Wang Shiwen to meet with Li Cou to form the plot.

Two days later, Emperor Wenzong summoned the senior officials, including the heads of the various key agencies of the imperial government, to inquire them as to what they opined. A number of advisory officials, including Cui Xuanliang (崔玄亮), Li Guyan, Wang Zhi (王質), Lu Jun (盧均), Shu Yuanbao (舒元褒), Jiang Xi (蔣係), Pei Xiu (裴休), and Wei Wen (韋溫), begged Emperor Wenzong to reopen the discussions with chancellors and move the entire investigations to the proper governmental authorities. Emperor Wenzong told them that he had already discussed with the high-level officials and ordered them to withdraw. Cui bowed and wept, stating, "One should be careful even when executing a commoner, and even more care should be paid when killing a chancellor." Emperor Wenzong's anger somewhat subsided, and he summoned the chancellors again. Niu then stated, "The highest that a subject can reach is chancellor, and Song Shenxi is already a chancellor. If the accusations were true, he could still only be chancellor, and why would he pursue that? Surely that was not what he was planning." Meanwhile, Zheng, fearing that the officials would win out and that a second round of investigations would show the truth, suggested to Wang Shoucheng that no executions be carried out, and instead Song should be exiled.

The next day, Li Cou was demoted in title to be the Duke of Chao County, while Song was exiled to be the military advisor to the prefect of Kai Prefecture (開州, in modern Chongqing). It was said that Song, while chancellor, was refusing bribes from all around the empire, and when his mansion was seized and searched, all that were found were documents relating to his receiving and rejecting the bribes that were sent to him, and there was much mourning over his exile.

Song would never be allowed to return to Chang'an while alive, and he died in 833 while still serving as Kai Prefecture. Emperor Wenzong ordered that his body be allowed to be returned to Chang'an for burial. In 836 — after a plot that Emperor Wenzong had with Zheng Zhu (who had, by that point, turned against the eunuchs) and Li Xun to slaughter the eunuchs (known as the Ganlu Incident) failed, leading to Zheng's and Li Xun's deaths — Song's reputation and offices were posthumously restored, and he was given further posthumous honors. His son Song Shenwei (宋慎微) was made a county sheriff.

== Family ==
According to New Book of Tang, volume 75, Song Shenwei was the second son of Shenxi. The eldest son of Shenxi was named Song Qiu (宋球) and had a son named Song Xuan (宋絢) with the courtesy name Taowen (韜文).

== Notes and references ==
- Old Book of Tang, vol. 167.
- New Book of Tang, vol. 152.
- Zizhi Tongjian, vols. 243, 244.
