= Jeannette Song =

Jing-Sheng Jeannette Song (Chinese: 宋京生) is a management scientist specializing in operations management and supply chain management. She is the R. David Thomas Professor of Business Administration and Professor of Operations Management in the Fuqua School of Business of Duke University.

== Education and career ==
Song earned a bachelor's degree in mathematics from Beijing Normal University in 1982, and a master's degree in operations research from the Institute of Applied Mathematics of the Chinese Academy of Sciences in 1984. After continuing to work at the Institute of Applied Mathematics until 1986, she went to Columbia University for doctoral study, and completed her Ph.D. in management science at Columbia Business School in 1991.

She joined the Graduate School of Management at the University of California, Irvine in 1991. She took a leave from UC Irvine from 1996 to 1998 to become an assistant professor of industrial engineering and operations research at Columbia University, but returned to Irvine with tenure. In 2003 she moved to Duke University as the R. David Thomas Professor. In 2018 Duke University named her as a distinguished professor.

Song was president of the Institute for Operations Research and the Management Sciences Manufacturing and Service Operations Management Society (INFORMS MSOM) for 2009–2010.

== Recognition ==
Song was elected to the 2017 class of Fellows of the Institute for Operations Research and the Management Sciences (INFORMS) and separately, in the same year, as a fellow of the INFORMS Manufacturing and Service Operations Management Society.

The Chinese Ministry of Education named Song as a Chang Jiang Chaired Professor in 2009. In 2015 she was a winner of the Chinese Thousand Talents Program.
