= Sirin =

Legendary creature in Russian folklore

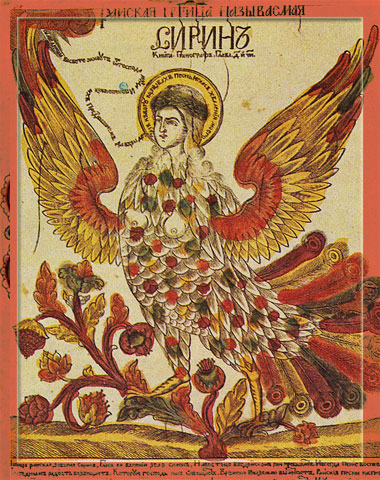
Sirin lubok print, 18th century

The Sirin (Russian: Сирин) is a legendary creature in Russian folklore, with the head of a beautiful woman and the body of a bird (usually an owl), often equated with sirens in Greek mythology. According to myth, the Sirin lived in Iriy or around the Euphrates River. The Sirin is considered the bird of sorrow; it is related to the Alkonost, the bird of joy.

== History ==
The legend of the Sirin may have a Persian origin.

The Pomors often depicted the Sirin on illustrations in the Book of Genesis as birds sitting in paradise trees.

Later, in the 17th–18th centuries, the image of the Sirin changed and she started to symbolize world harmony (as she lives near paradise). People in those times believed only happy people could hear the Sirin, while only very few could see one because she is as fast and difficult to catch as human happiness. She symbolizes eternal joy and heavenly happiness.

== Folklore ==
The Sirin may be directly equated with sirens in Greek mythology. However, instead of using its voice to lure sailors to their deaths, the Sirin uses it to reward the virtuous.

She was usually portrayed wearing a crown or with a nimbus. The Sirin sang beautiful songs to the saints, foretelling future blisses. The bird was dangerous. Men who heard her would forget everything on earth, follow her, and ultimately die. People would attempt to save themselves from the Sirin by shooting cannons, ringing bells and making other loud noises to scare the bird off.

According to folk tales, on the morning of the Apple Feast of the Saviour, the Sirin flies into the apple orchard and cries sadly. In the afternoon, the Alkonost flies to this place, beginning to rejoice and laugh. The Alkonost brushes dew from her wings, granting healing powers to all fruits on the tree she is sitting on.

The Sirin is sometimes seen as a metaphor for God's word going into the soul of a man. Sometimes she is seen as a metaphor of heretics tempting the weak. In Russian folklore, Sirin was mixed with the revered religious writer, Ephrem the Syrian. Thus, peasant lyrists such as Nikolay Klyuev often used the Sirin as a synonym for poet. The Sirin has been glossed equivalent to the vila in an old text. (Note: In a 14th century Old Slavic transcription of the writings of the Byzantine George Hamartolos, there is mention of "двъ животни яже и сирины наричутся рекше вилы [two creatures known as sirins—that is, vilas]".)

== Gallery ==
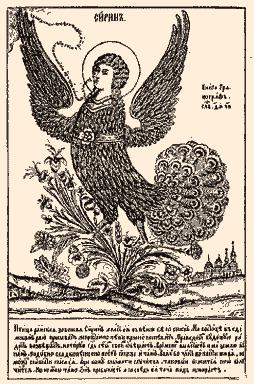
Sirin (postcard), 1908

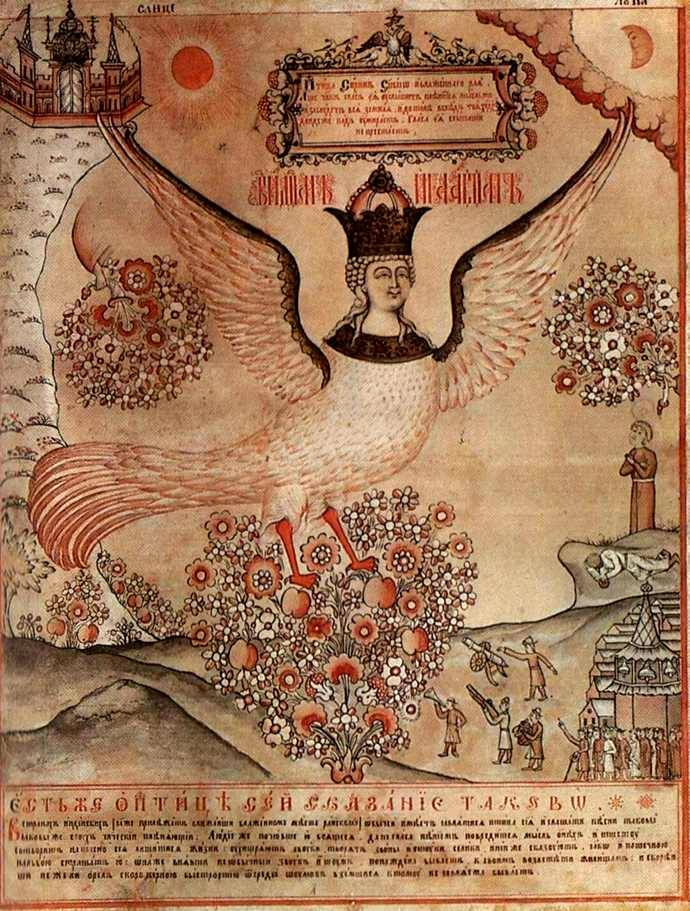
Russian lubok print, 19th century

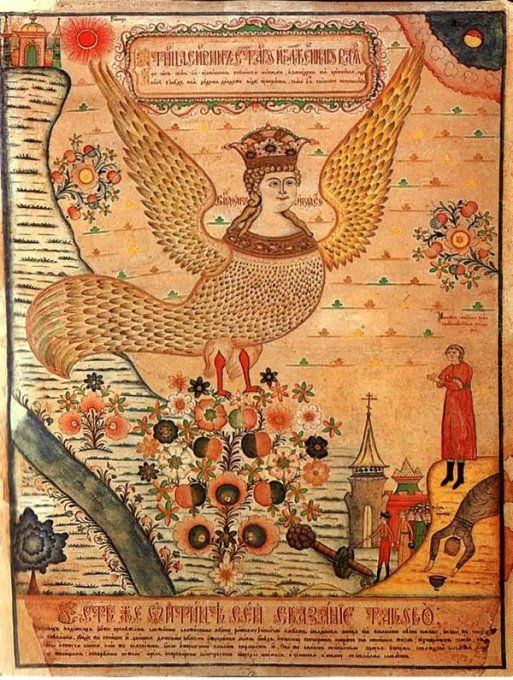
Russian lubok print, 19th century

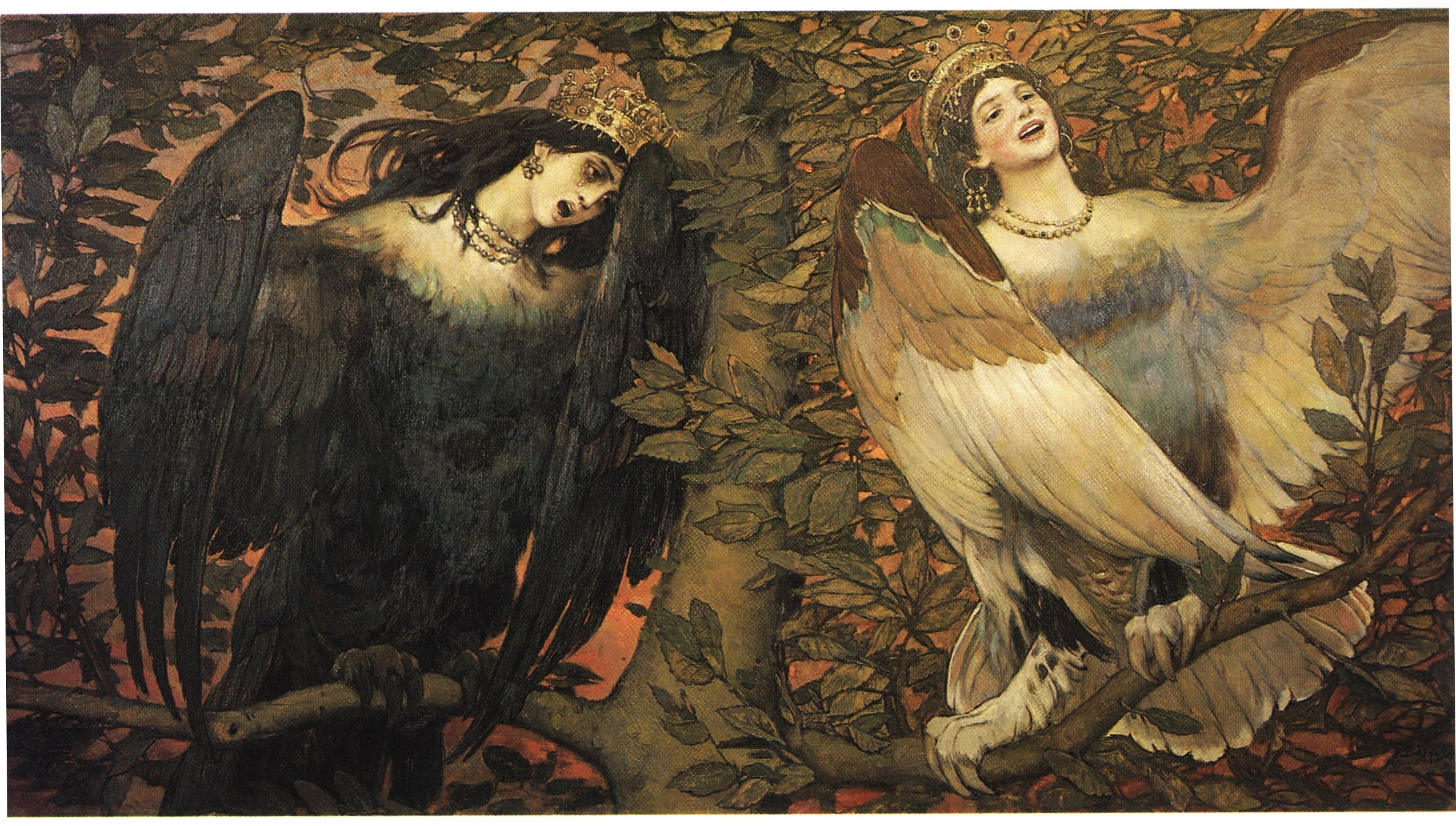
Sirin (left) and Alkonost (right) in Viktor Vasnetsov's Birds of Joy and Sorrow, 1896

== In popular culture ==
- Alternative band Birds of Tokyo have a track named "Sirin" on their March Fires Album.
- Author Vladimir Nabokov published under the pseudonym Sirin.
- A Moog synthesizer uses the name "Sirin: Analog Messenger of Joy".
- The Chinese Mobile game Honkai Impact 3rd features a Slavic girl from Belarus named Sirin, as one of the game's major antagonists.
- "Songbird" Sirin is a female companion in the game Tyranny, who enchants people's minds with her singing.
- The progressive folk artist Marjana Semkina, lead singer of the duo iamthemorning released her second solo album "Sirin" in 2024, describing the mythical bird as a "harbinger of bad luck and death."

== See also ==
- Alkonost
- Gamayun
- Harpy

== Sources ==
- Bane, Theresa (9 May 2016). "Sirin". Encyclopedia of Beasts and Monsters in Myth, Legend and Folklore. McFarland. p. 293. ISBN 978-0-7864-9505-4.
- Dixon-Kennedy, Mike (8 December 1998). "Sirin". Encyclopedia of Russian and Slavic Myth and Legend. Bloomsbury Publishing USA. p. 258. ISBN 978-1-57607-487-9.
- Tokarev, S. A., ed. (2008) [1980]. "Сирин". Мифы народов мира: Энциклопедия. Электронное издание (in Russian). Moscow: Советская Энциклопедия. p. 919.
