= Gamayun =

Russian mythical bird

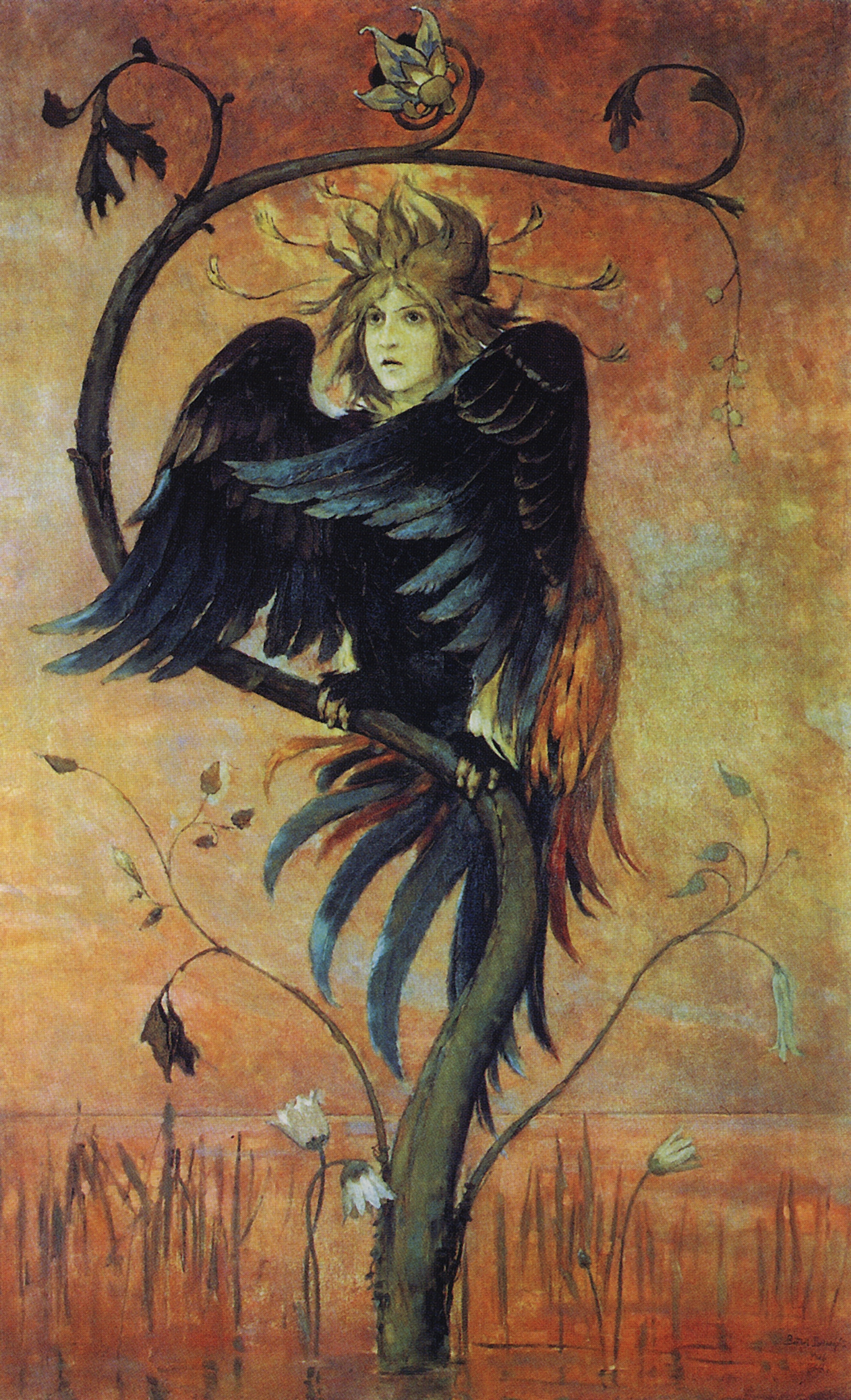
Gamayun, the Prophetic Bird, by Viktor Vasnetsov (1897).

The Gamayun (Russian: Гамаю́н) is a prophetic bird in Russian folklore. It is a symbol of wisdom and knowledge and lives on an island in the mythical east, close to paradise.

== Etymology ==
The name may have a Persian origin as the Huma bird appears in Persian mythology. According to Oleg Trubachyov, the name comes from the "young Avestan hu-māiia".

== Description ==
The Gamayun is normally depicted as a large black bird with a woman's head. She is said to spread divine messages and prophecies, which she imparts through her songs, but like the Sirin, this can be used to lure men to follow it for the rest of their lives: "Its prophecies are available to a selected group of people, and its appearance can cause deadly elements".

== History ==
Medieval Russian literature distinguished the Gamayun, a bird of paradise that spends its entire life in the air, from other mythological birds, including the phoenix (a regenerating bird without anthropomorphic features), the Alkonost (a bird that calms sea storms), and the Sirin (a bird with a female face that is capable of enchanting people with its voice). The bird was defined by appearance and voice.

In books dating to the 17th–19th centuries, the Gamayun is described as a legless and wingless bird, ever-flying with the help of a tail, foreshadowing the death of statesmen by her fall. During the Silver Age of Russian Poetry, it often appeared as the source of tragic prophecies, such as in Alexander Blok's Gamayun, the Prophetic Bird.

The Gamayun is depicted on the coat of arms of Smolensk.

== Sources ==
- Bane, Theresa (9 May 2016). "Gamayun". Encyclopedia of Beasts and Monsters in Myth, Legend and Folklore. McFarland. p. 132. ISBN 978-0-7864-9505-4.
- DeMello, Margo (22 February 2024). "Gamayun". Bigfoot to Mothman: A Global Encyclopedia of Legendary Beasts and Monsters. Bloomsbury Academic. pp. 223–224. ISBN 978-1-4408-7725-4.
- Kuznetsova, Olga (23 December 2021). "Птичий Рай: о судьбе райских птиц на Руси в Новое время" [Birds' Eden: Birds of Paradise in Early Modern Russian Culture]. Acta Universitatis Lodziensis. Folia Litteraria Rossica (in Russian) (14): 9–16. doi:10.18778/1427-9681.14.02.
- Mahbobzadh, Sara; Nasrutdinova, Liliya Harisovna; Yahyapour, Marzieh (2020). "Reception of Mythological Image of the Bird at Bunin Cycle «The Bird's Shadow»". Utopía y Praxis Latinoamericana. 25 (Esp.7): 417–423.
- Trubachyov, Oleg (2005) [1992]. В поисках единства: взгляд филолога на проблему истоков Руси. Наука. ISBN 5-02-033259-3.
