= Cornelia Wulkopf =

German opera singer (born 1952)

- Born: 1952 (age 73–74); Braunschweig, Germany
- Education: Hochschule für Musik Detmold
- Occupation: Operatic mezzo-soprano
- Organizations: Bavarian State Opera
- Website: www.corneliawulkopf.de

Cornelia Wulkopf (born 1952) is a German operatic mezzo-soprano and contralto. A long-time member of the Bavarian State Opera, she has performed leading parts at international opera houses and festivals. She made her debut at the Bayreuth Festival in the Jahrhundertring and sang in Franz Schmidt's oratorio Das Buch mit sieben Siegeln at the Salzburg Festival.

== Career ==
Born in Braunschweig, Wulkopf trained after school to be a nurse for children, from 1968 to 1971. She studied voice at the Hochschule für Musik Detmold with Helmut Kretschmar, Günther Weißenborn and Rainer Weber. In 1976, she was awarded first prize in the competition for German music colleges (Wettbewerb der deutschen Musikhochschulen) and won first prizes at the Bundeswettbewerb Gesang in Berlin, in the categories of Opera and Concert.

She made her stage debut in 1977 at the Bayreuth Festival as Floßhilde and Siegrune in the Jahrhundertring, the centenary production of Wagner's Der Ring des Nibelungen, conducted by Pierre Boulez and staged by Patrice Chéreau.

From the 1977/78 season, she was a member of the Bavarian State Opera in Munich, where she performed first as Erda in the Ring, then as Schwertleite and Waltraute, as Magdalene in Wagner's Die Meistersinger von Nürnberg, and Brangäne in his Tristan und Isolde. Leading roles included Orpheus in Gluck's Orpheus und Euridice, Ulrica" in Verdi's Ein Maskenball, Azucena in his Der Troubadour, and the Witch in Humperdinck's Hänsel und Gretel. In 1988, she was named a Bavarian Kammersängerin. From 1990, she has worked freelance. She performed as a guest at the house in roles such as the mother in Berg's Lulu in the 2015/16 season, conducted by Kirill Petrenko, alongside Marlis Petersen in the title role.

Beginning in 1980, she appeared as a guest at major opera houses in Germany, such as the Hamburg State Opera, the Staatsoper Hannover where she also appeared as the Nurse in Die Frau ohne Schatten by Richard Strauss, in Karlsruhe and Berlin. In Europe, she sang at the Vienna State Opera, at La Scala, the Liceu in Barcelona and the Zürich Opera House, among others. She appeared at more international festivals, including the Bregenzer Festspiele, Bergen International Festival, Festival de Radio France et Montpellier and Ravello Festival. In 2005, she appeared as Baronin Grünwiesel in Henze's Der junge Lord in a production of the Theater Klagenfurt. She sang the role of Filipjewna in Tschaikovky's Eugen Onegin at the Staatsoper Stuttgart in 2008, conducted by Marc Soustrot. She appeared as the Old Baroness in Barber's Vanessa at the Theater Gießen in 2009, and as Aunti in Britten's Peter Grimes at the Teatro Regio Turino in 2010, alongside Neil Shicoff in the title role.

In concert, she performed the Salzburg Festival in 1981, singing the alto part of Das Buch mit sieben Siegeln by Franz Schmidt. She has collaborated with conductors Karl Richter, Wolfgang Sawallisch, Seiji Ozawa, Václav Neumann, Eugen Jochum, Leif Segerstam, Marek Janowski, Carlos Kleiber, Marc Albrecht, Christian Thielemann, in Germany and abroad. She gave recitals with pianists Sawallisch, Helmut Deutsch, Rainer Weber and Klaus Schilde. She has appeared on radio and television.

== Recordings ==
Wulkopf recorded the role of Apollo in Mozart's Apollo et Hyacinthus in 1981, conducted by Leopold Hager, of Marzelline in his Le nozze di Figaro in 1987, conducted by Colin Davis, and of Gertrude in Marschner's Hans Heiling in 2004, conducted by Renato Palumbo.

In 1982, she recorded Beethoven's Mass in C major and Mozart's Litany, K. 243, conducted by Günter Wand. She recorded the alto part in Bach's Mass in B minor, conducted by Sergiu Celibidache, in a live concert at the Munich Gasteig in 1990.

Her recordings also include:

- Max Reger: An die Hoffnung, Da Camera
- F. und R. Strauss: Kammermusik für Horn, Alt und Klavier, DuG
- Sakrale Waldhornmusik, Ars Produktion
- Brahms, Dvořák: Lieder, Ars Produktion
- Verdi: Requiem, ambitus
- Mozart: Apollo et Hyacinthus, DGG
- Egk: Peer Gynt, Orfeo
- Rossini: Mosè, Orfeo
- Schubert: Lazarus, Orfeo
- Lortzing: Zar und Zimmermann, HMV-Electrola
- Puccini: La fanciulla del West, RCA
- J. S. Bach: Mass in B minor, Electrola
- Mozart: Die Zauberflöte, Philipps
- Marschner: Hans Heiling
- Beethoven: Mass in C major and Mozart, Litaniae de Venerabili, K. 243, Hännsler, Günter Wand Edition
- P. Cornelius: Der Barbier von Bagdad, Bavarian State Opera, 1987
