= Yumiko Urabe =

Japanese pianist (born 1959)

Yumiko Urabe (占部 由美子, Urabe Yumiko; born 1959) is a Japanese pianist who started playing when she was five years old. Later on, she enrolled in the Tokyo University of the Arts in Tokyo and then studied with Klaus Schilde before graduating from the Hochschule für Musik und Theater München with a master's degree. By 1988 became a teacher there before being promoted to professor in 2006. She was a prizewinner at the José Iturbi Competition in Valencia and the GPA International Piano Competition in Dublin. She has performed such musicians as András Adorján, Lisa Batiaschvili, Ana Chumachenco, Veronika Eberle, Walter Nothas, Tatjana Vassiljeva and Wen-Sinn Yang and played at various festivals including the European Kilkenny Music Festival and Schleswig-Holstein Musik Festival. She has performed in Japan, Korea, Taiwan, and throughout North America except Mexico. Her CDs were published by Naxos Records and other popular labels.
