= Apollo et Hyacinthus =

1767 opera by Wolfgang Amadeus Mozart

- Opera by W. A. Mozart
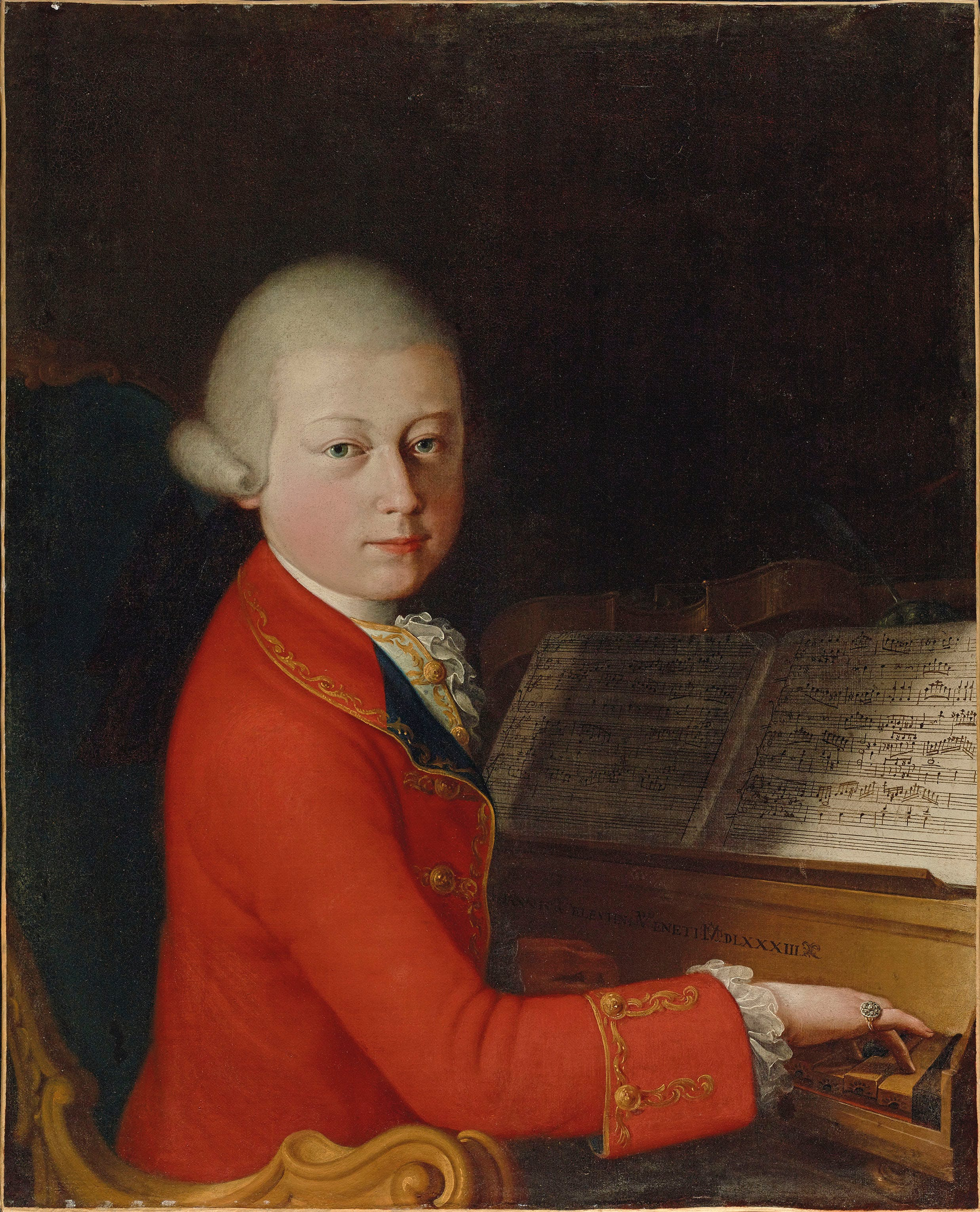
- 1770 Verona portrait of Mozart
- Librettist: Rufinus Widl
- Language: Latin
- Based on: Ovid's Metamorphoses
- Premiere: 13 May 1767; Benedictine University, Salzburg

Apollo et Hyacinthus seu Hyacinthi metamorphosis (Latin for Apollo and Hyacinth or The Metamorphosis of Hyacinth), K. 38, is an opera in three acts written in 1767 by Wolfgang Amadeus Mozart, who was 11 years old at the time. It is Mozart's first true opera, as Die Schuldigkeit des ersten Gebots is generally considered to be a sacred drama. As is suggested by the name, the opera is based upon the Greek myth of Hyacinth and Apollo as told by Roman poet Ovid in his Metamorphoses. Interpreting this work, Rufinus Widl wrote the libretto in Latin.

== History ==
After notable success in other areas of Europe, Mozart was commissioned to compose a piece for the Benedictine University in his hometown of Salzburg where it was first performed on 13 May 1767. Mozart's father, Leopold, was a notable name at the university, as many of his pupils were enrolled in the university high school, where theatre played a large role in the curriculum.

Mozart's first encounter with the university was at the age of five on September 1 and 3, 1761, when he appeared as an extra in Jakob Anton Wimmer and Johann Ernst Eberlin's Latin Drama Sigismundes Hungariae Rex. Though Mozart was often involved at the university, he was never enrolled as a student.

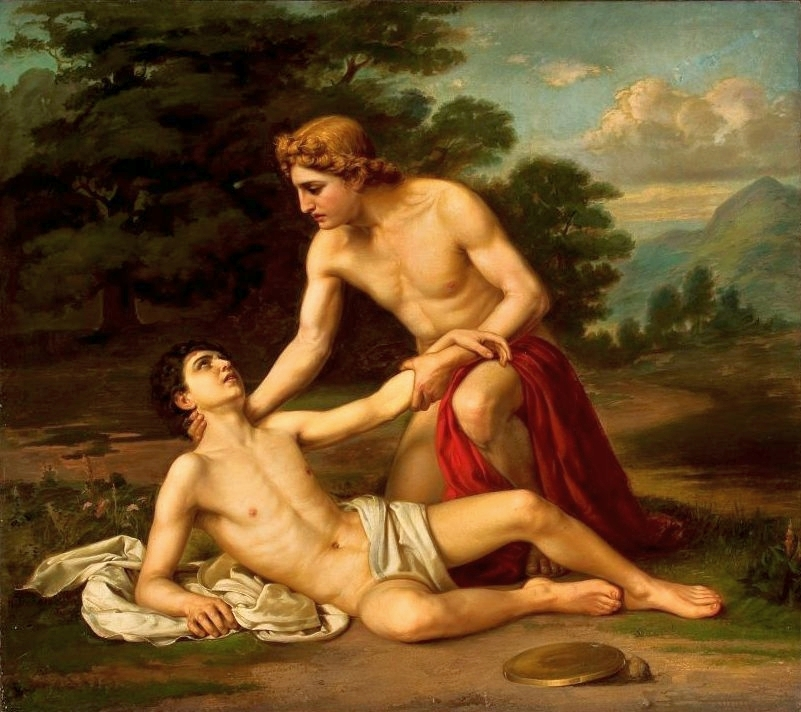
Death of Hyacinth, by Alexander Kiselyov

Apollo et Hyacinthus was part of a much larger work, which has caused debate as to whether this work can be considered Mozart's first 'operatic work'. Many historians consider it to be operatic because it is a secular drama composed of five arias, two duets, a chorus and a trio, connected with recitative. However, it was part of the annual end-of-term 'final comoedia' and did not even receive a distinguishing name until Mozart's sister Nannerl entered it into Leopold's catalogue of his son's early works with the name Apollo und Hyacinth after the composer's death. The custom at the university was to perform short musical dramas or 'intermedia' interspersed between acts of the larger play. This particular performance was of the five-act tragedy Clementia Croesi, written by the university's philosophy professor Rufinus Widl. The main work and Mozart's intermedia were designed by Widl to share general motifs and themes. Widl's tragedy dealt with the accidental death of the son of the King of Lydia by a misplaced spear throw. Mozart's work paralleled this theme by mounting a story first told by Euripides. In the original story, Apollo accidentally kills his lover, a boy named Hyacinth, with one of his stray discus throws. The discus throw was encouraged by Apollo's rival, Zephyrus, jealous of his affair with Hyacinth. A grief-stricken Apollo then causes a gorgeous flower to bloom from Hyacinth's grave. Father Rufinus retained the outlined of this plot but removed the controversial themes of a homosexual love triangle by adding in two new characters: Hyacinth's father Oebalus and his sister Melia, the new source of Apollo's love and the jealousy of Zephyr. The performance was a great success but was only performed once during the composer's lifetime.

== Roles ==
Roles, voice types, premiere cast
Role	Voice type	Premiere cast (Note: Original cast according to libretto by the Salzburg University printer and bookseller, Joseph Mair.)
Oebalus, King of Lacedaemonia	tenor	The excellent and erudite Herr Mattias Stadler (c. 1744–1827), student of moral theology and law
Melia, Oebalus's daughter	boy soprano (en travesti)	Felix Fuchs (1752–1778), chapel chorister and first-year student
Hyacinthus, Oebalus's son	boy soprano	Christian Enzinger (1747–1779), chapel chorister and first-year student
Apollo, entertained by Oebalus as his guest	boy contralto	Johann Ernst (1755 – after 1770), chapel chorister
Zephyrus, Hyacinthus's confidant	boy contralto	Joseph Vonderthon (1749–1797), fourth-year pupil
First Priest of Apollo	bass	Joseph Bründl (1747–1808), poetry-class pupil
Second Priest of Apollo	bass	Jakob Moser (1751 – after 1770), fourth-year pupil

== Plot summary ==
Act 1 – Following the short intrada in D major, the work opens with the prologue where Hyacinth confides in Zephyr of the youth's attachment to Apollo and of Zephyr's jealousy. Next, King Oebalus and Melia appear at an altar where they are preparing a sacrifice to Apollo. A storm soon begins to brew and destroys the altar with lightning. Oebalus's son assures him that they have done nothing to conjure the wrath of Apollo. Towards the end of the prologue, Apollo appears, disguised as a shepherd. He announces that Jupiter has banished him and he asks for Oebalus's friendship, which he is quickly given. Soon, a mutual attraction is aroused between Melia and Apollo and he asks of evidence of her love for him.

Act 2 – Oebalus tells Melia that Apollo has requested her hand and Melia is overjoyed. However, Zephyr soon enters with the terrible news that, while sporting in the woods, Apollo threw a discus and fatally struck Hyacinth in the head. Oebalus, in a rage, orders Apollo to be banished from his kingdom. Zephyr, in an aside to the audience, confesses his guilt but eagerly obeys Oebalus's order and then proceeds to make advances on Melia in Apollo's absence. Melia refuses to consider Zephyr's advances. While he is making these inappropriate advances on Melia, Apollo appears, professes his innocence and turns Zephyr into a wind. Melia still believes Apollo to be the murderer of her brother and now begins to deny Apollo's advances.

Act 3 – The final act begins with the final breaths of Hyacinth where he describes the real cause of his murder to his father. Oebalus realizes Zephyr's guilt while he watches his own son die. Melia then enters and tells her father that she has denied Apollo before she learns of Zephyr's guilt as well. Oebalus and Melia wallow in their misfortune and the loss of the favor of their protecting god before Apollo again appears, claiming that love has compelled him to return to Melia. Beautiful flowers then rise from Hyacinth's grave, Apollo and Melia are engaged and Apollo ensures that the kingdom will flourish forever under his protection.

== Musical characteristics ==
The work is orchestrated for 2 oboes, two natural horns, and a string section. Most of the arias in this work embody emotional states, set up in the recitatives. The majority of these are da capo arias that repeat the text and music of the A-section, directly after a contrasting B-section. Sometimes, however Mozart removes the repeat; for example, Apollo's short E major aria which concludes the prologue ends with the instrumental ritornello but no text repeat from the singer. The most impressive writings in this work, though, may be the ones featuring multiple characters. These pieces display a firm grasp of the techniques of 18th-century dramatic composition from the eleven-year old Mozart. The moving C major duet between Oebalus and Melia is an extraordinary composition featuring a through-composed style with enticing orchestral effects – such as muted violins, under which the rest of the strings play pizzicato. The scene that opens the second chorus is when Hyacinth dies in the presence of his father. This piece is a brilliant example of music's dramatic function and is also the first example of accompanied recitative in all of Mozart's music.

== Recordings ==
- 1982 – Anthony Rolfe Johnson (Oebalus), Arleen Auger (Melia), Edith Mathis (Hyacinthus), Cornelia Wulkopf (Apollo), Hanna Schwarz (Zephyrus) – Salzburger Kammerchoor, Mozarteum Orchestra Salzburg, Leopold Hager – 2 CDs Philips Records
- 1990 – John Dickie (Oebalus), Věnceslava Hrubá-Freiberger (Melia), Arno Raunig (Hyacinthus), Ralf Popken (Apollo), Axel Köhler (Zephyrus) – Rundfunkchor Leipzig, Rundfunk-Sinfonieorchester Leipzig, Max Pommer – 2 CDs Edel Records
- 2006 – Robert Morvai (Oebalus), Antonia Bouervé (Melia), Anna Haase (Hyacinthus), Daniel Lager (Apollo), Alon Harari (Zephyrus) – European Chamber Soloists, Nicol Matt – 2 CDs Brilliant Classics
- 2011 – Andrew Kennedy (Oebalus), Klara Ek (Melia), Sophie Bevan (Hyacinthus), Lawrence Zazzo (Apollo), Christopher Ainslie (Zephyrus) – The Orchestra of Classical Opera, Ian Page – 2 SACDs Linn Records
