= Peer Gynt (opera) =

1938 opera by Werner Egk

- Opera by Werner Egk
- Librettist: Werner Egk
- Language: German
- Based on: Peer Gynt by Henrik Ibsen
- Premiere: 24 November 1938; Berlin State Opera

Peer Gynt is a 1938 opera by Werner Egk to a libretto after the play Peer Gynt by Henrik Ibsen. The premiere took place on 24 November 1938 at the Berlin State Opera where Egk was the conductor at the time.

The opera was controversial in the Nazi press. This criticism was quashed when Adolf Hitler, an attendee at the performance, allegedly approved of the work. Despite Stravinsky-like music, the premiere met the approval of Joseph Goebbels and Adolf Hitler, although Hermann Göring raged against it, and that approval has since tainted both the opera and composer. The opera was performed in seven German cities until 1944 and even in Czech in Prague and in Paris.

== Roles ==
- Peer Gynt (baritone)
- Solveig (soprano)
- Aase, Peer Gynt's mother (contralto)
- Ingrid (soprano)
- Mads, Ingrid's fiancé (tenor)
- The Old Man (king of the trolls) (tenor)
- Redhaired Woman (his daughter) (soprano)
- The President (bass)
- Three Merchants (tenor, baritone, bass)
- Three Black Birds (sopranos)
- An Stranger (bass)
- Farmer Haegstad (bass)
- The Blacksmith (baritone)
- The Vogt (tenor)
- The Vogt's Wife (mezzo-soprano)
- An Old Man (tenor)
- A Court Troll (soprano)
- A Little Troll (soprano)
- A Waiter (tenor)
- Six Officials at the Troll Court
- Wedding Guests, Trolls, Ship Crew, Negroes, Whores, et al.

== Recording ==
- Peer Gynt, Wilfried Vorwold (bass), Kari Løvaas (soprano), Norma Sharp (soprano), Cornelia Wulkopf (alto), Janet Perry (soprano), Waldemar Wild (bass). Bavarian Radio Symphony Orchestra, Heinz Wallberg, Orfeo Classics 1982
