= Henri-Joseph Ruxthiel =

French sculptor

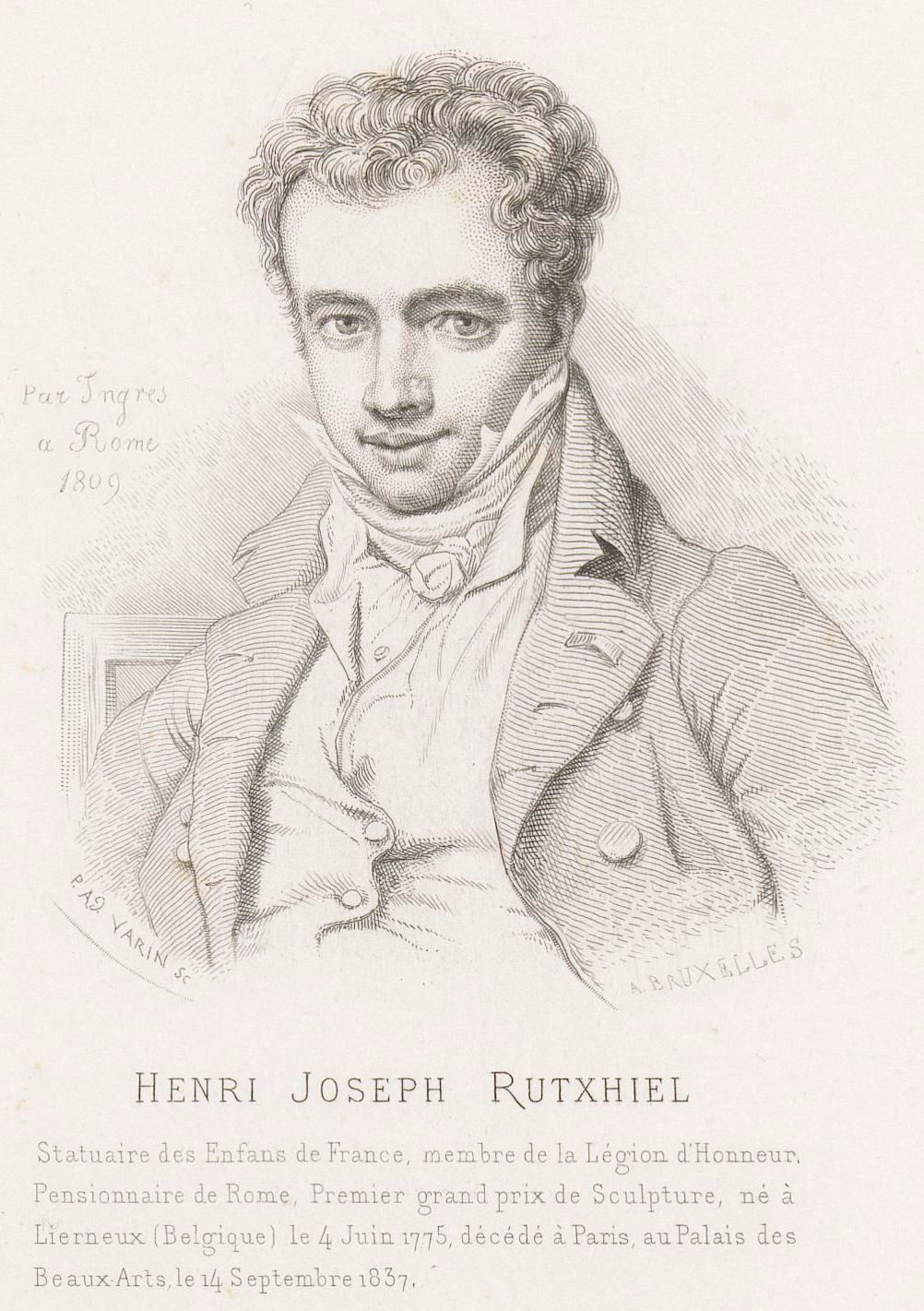
- Gravure d'Adolphe Varin.
- Born: 1775
- Died: 15 September 1837 (aged 61–62)
- Alma mater: French Academy in Rome
- Occupation: Sculptor

Henri-Joseph Rutxhiel (1775 in Lierneux, Holy Roman Empire – 1837 in Paris, France) was a Belgian sculptor. He belonged to the neoclassicism movement.

He was first a shepherd, then a sculptor in his late life. In 1800, he became the pupil of Jean-Antoine Houdon, then that of sculptor Philippe-Laurent Roland and the painter Jacques-Louis David. In 1809, he won the Prix de Rome for sculpture with a relief Dédale attachant des ailes à son fils Icare and then went to the Villa Medici.

== Main works ==
- Zéphyr enlevant Psyché 1814, group, marble, Paris, musée du Louvre
- Le Roi de Rome (1811), bust, marble, château de Chimay
- Portrait d'Elfriede Clarke de Feltre, bust, marble, Nantes, Musée des Beaux-Arts
- Buste du Duc de Berry (Duke of Berry) en costume militaire, bronze, Paris, musée du Louvre
Works

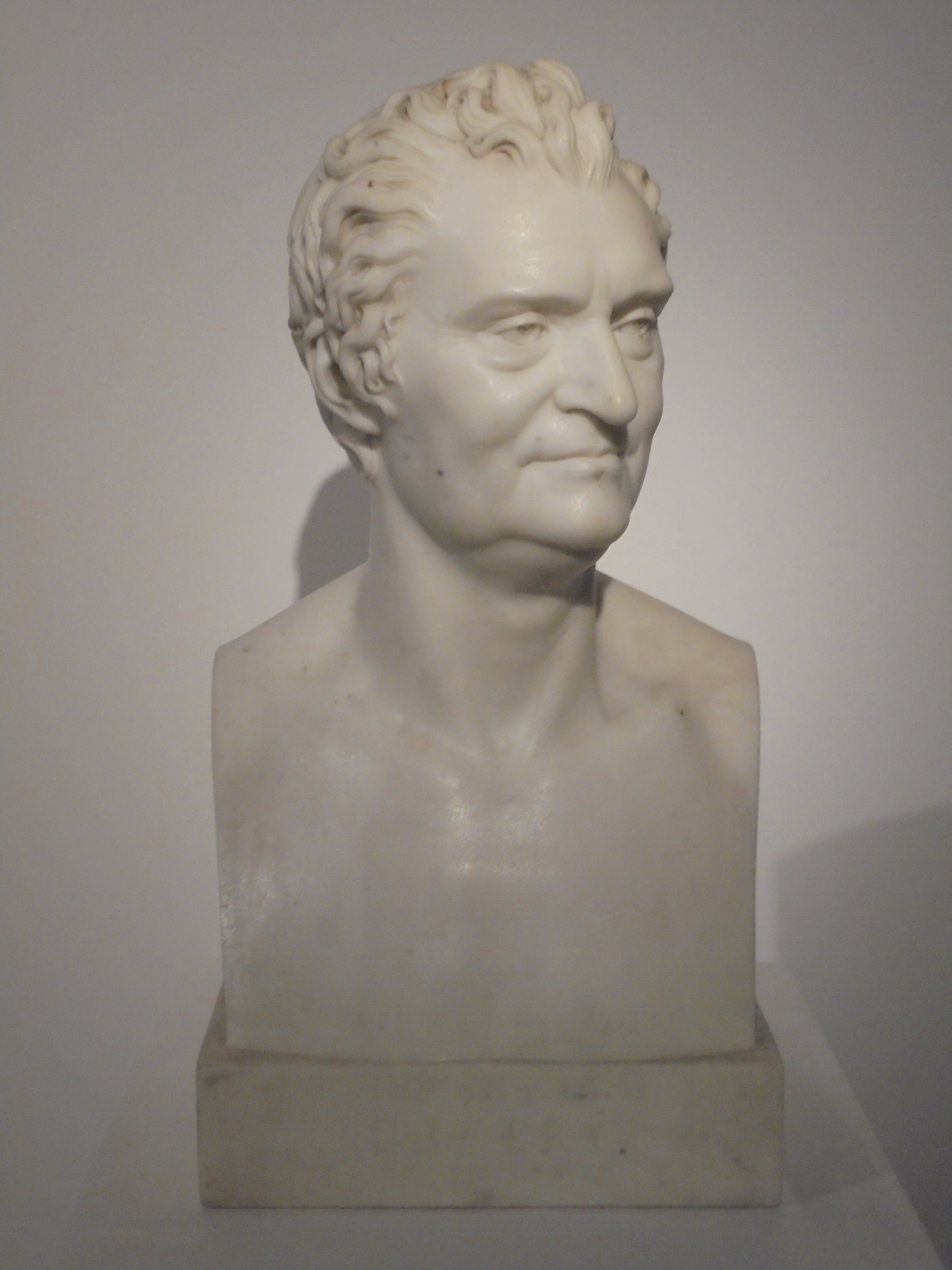
Bust of Gréty, 1804–1805.

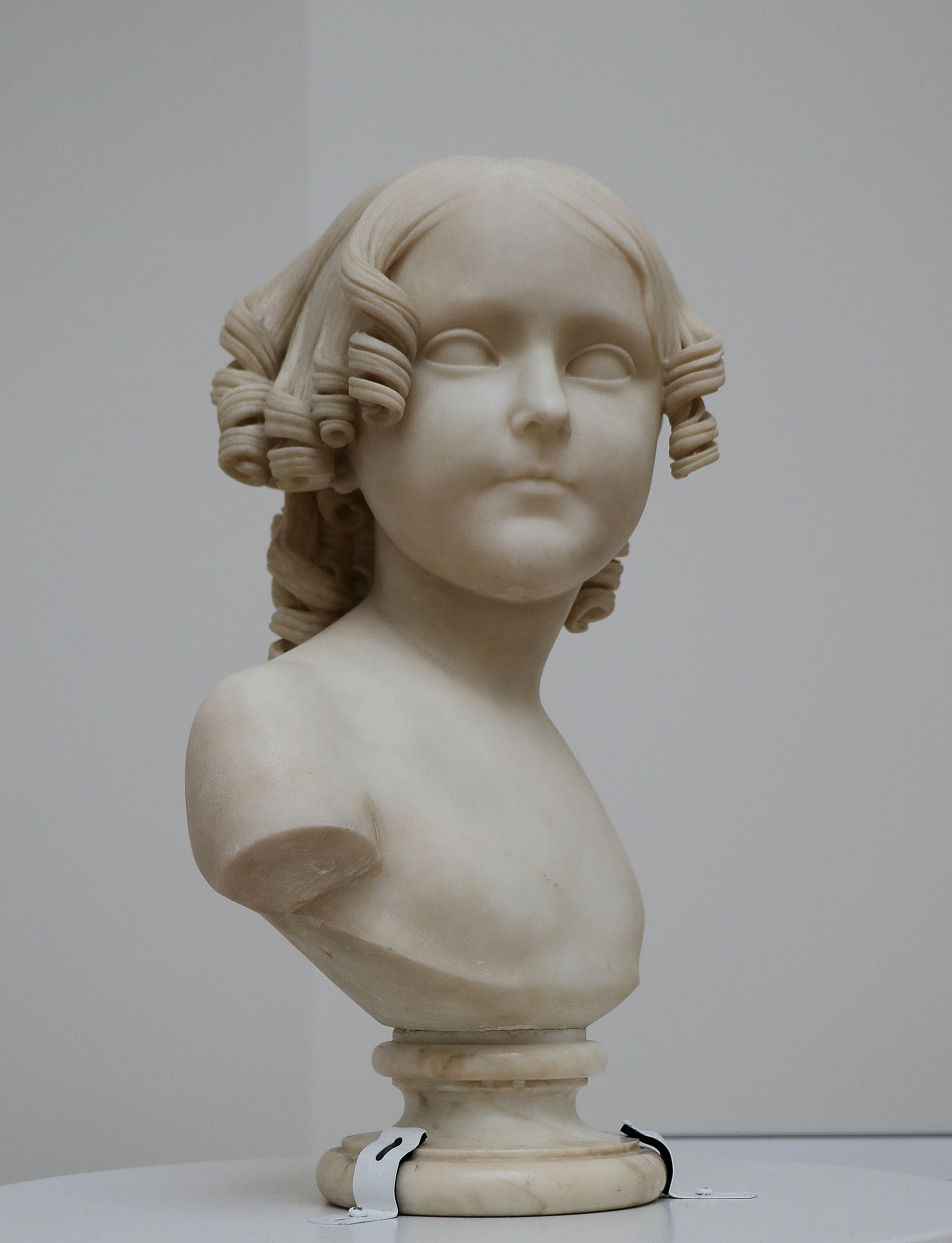
Bust of Elfride Clarke de Feltre, 1813.

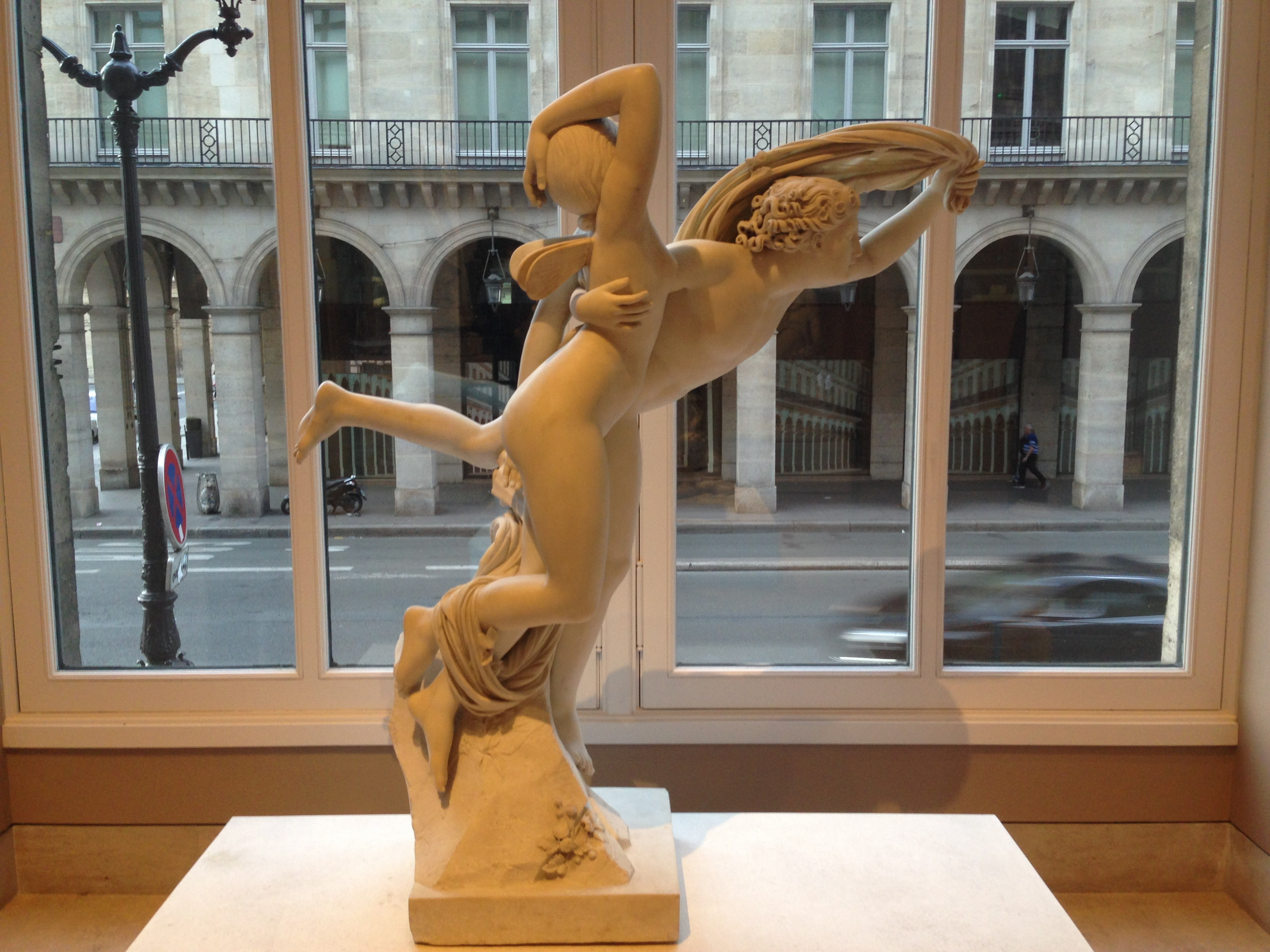
Zéphyr rapting Psyché, 1814.

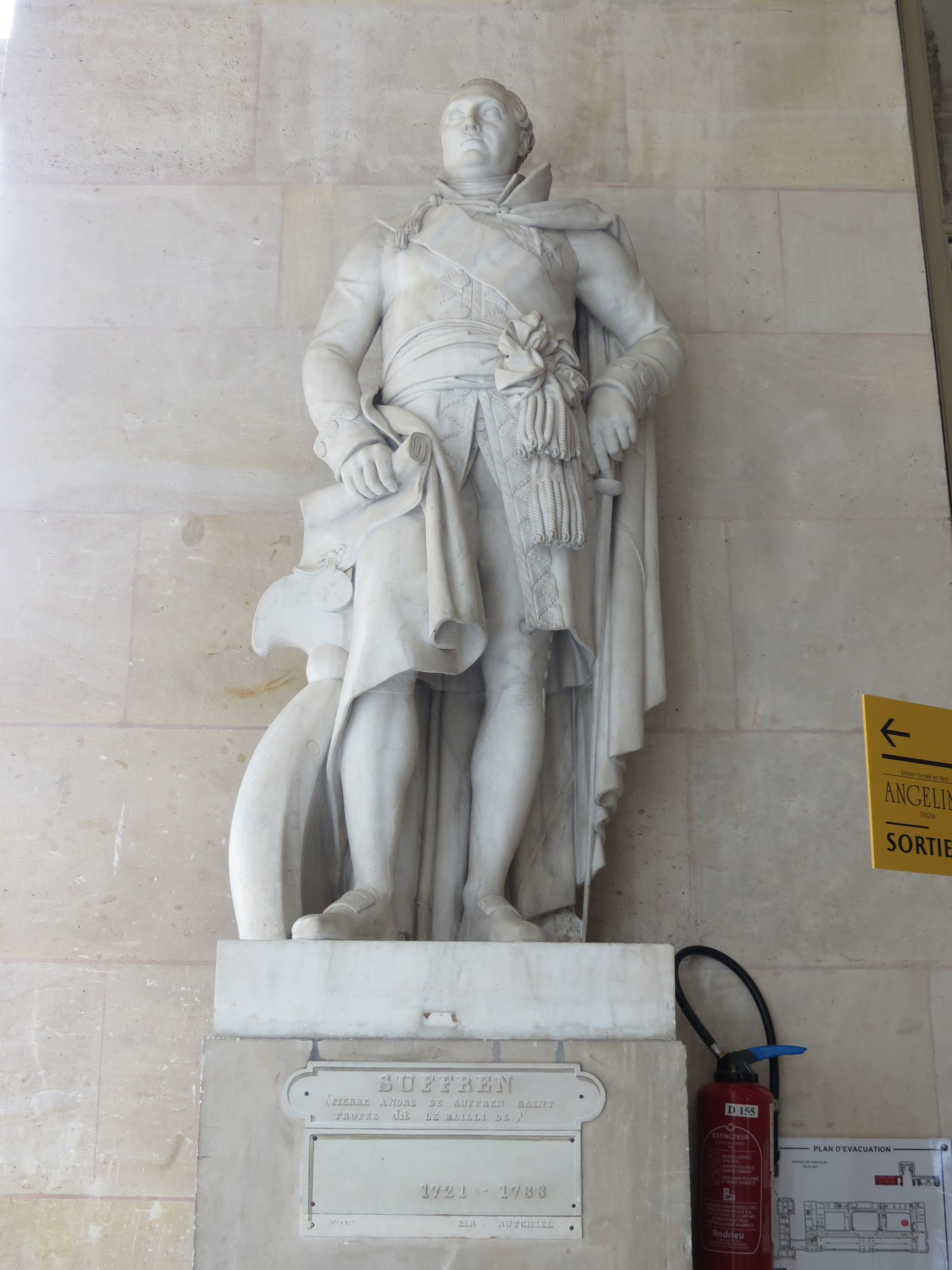
Statue of Suffren, 1819.
