= Rufinus Widl =

Bavarian priest and professor in University of Salzburg

Rufinus Widl (26 September 1731 – 12 March 1798) was a Bavarian Benedictine monk and a lecturer at Salzburg University from 1767 until his death.

Widl was born in Frauenwörth, Frauenchiemsee, Bavaria. He wrote a dissertation on Elementibus logicae in 1751. His most famous work today is the opera Apollo et Hyacinthus to music by Mozart; it was an entr'acte to a play performed by students at the university, Clementia Croesi, which was also written by Father Widl, and first performed in 1767. Another opera, Filii in parentum amor, was performed at Salzburg University in 1765 with music by Joseph Meissner. Widl died in Obing, Bavaria.
