= Oppian =

2nd-century Greco-Roman poet

Oppian (Ancient Greek: Ὀππιανός, Oppianós; Latin: Oppianus), also known as Oppian of Anazarbus, of Corycus, or of Cilicia, was a 2nd-century Greco-Roman poet during the reign of the emperors Marcus Aurelius and Commodus, who composed the Halieutica, a five-book didactic epic on fishing.

== Biography ==
Oppian states that he is from 'the city of Hermes' and the 'city at the promontory of Sarpedon'. This has been supplemented by information from the biographies attached to medieval manuscripts, which state that his birthplace was Caesarea (now known as Anazarbus) or Corycus in Cilicia, or Corycus according to the Suda. All these cities were in the Roman province of Cilicia, in what is now southern Turkey.

He composed a didactic poem in Greek hexameter on fishing: the Halieutica (Ἁλιευτικά, Halieutiká). It is about 3500 lines and bears a dedication to Marcus Aurelius and his son Commodus, placing it to the time of their joint rule (176-180 AD).

A later didactic poem on hunting, the Cynegetica (Κυνηγετικά, Kynēgetiká), was also attributed to Oppian. For that reason, its anonymous poet is generally referred to as Pseudo-Oppian or Oppian of Apamea. Furthermore, a didactic poem on bird catching, Ixeutica (Ἰξευτικά, Ixeutiká), which now only survives in a prose paraphrase, was also attributed to Oppian in the manuscript tradition. The Ixeutica is now thought to describe a work composed by the Dionysus mentioned by the Suda as the author of a treatise on rocks, Lithiaca (Λιθιακά, Lithiaká). A likely explanation for the attribution of all these works to Oppian is that the three didactic poems on hunting, fishing, and fowling were at some point circulated as a complementary trio.

According to the anonymous biographies attached to the Byzantine manuscripts of the Halieutica, Oppian's father, having incurred the displeasure of Marcus Aurelius's co-ruler Lucius Verus by neglecting to pay his respects to him when he visited Rome, was banished to Malta. Oppian, who had accompanied his father into exile, returned after the death of Verus (AD 169) and presented his poems to Aurelius, who was so pleased with them that he gave the author a piece of gold for each line, took him into favour, and pardoned his father. Oppian subsequently returned to his native country but died of the plague shortly afterwards at the early age of thirty. His contemporaries erected a statue in his honour, with an inscription which is still extant, containing a lament for his premature death and a eulogy of his precocious genius.

== The Halieutica ==
The Halieutica consists of five books, which can be divided into two parts: books 1-2 describe the behaviour of fish and other marine animals, books 3-5 contain various fishing techniques. The content of the Halieutica is not sufficient to serve as a practical guide for fishing. Instead, the humans and animals described in the work often seem to provide examples of good and bad behaviour. The fish in the Halieutica are depicted in an anthropomorphic fashion, as their behaviour is generally motivated by emotions such as hate, love, greed, jealousy and friendship. The fish are also very frequently the subject of Homeric similes. In many cases, Oppian reverses the Homeric technique: where Homer compares epic heroes with animals, the actions of animals in the Halieutica are often compared to all types of human behaviour.

The content of the Halieutica is as follows:

- Book 1: after the introduction and dedication of the work to Marcus Aurelius, the first half of the work contains a catalogue of marine animal species, sorted by their habitat (Hal. 1.80-445). The second half describes their reproductive behaviour (Hal. 1.446-797).
- Book 2: this book describes the 'battles' of fish, how predators catch their prey and techniques that fish use to avoid capture by other fish.
- Book 3: the book starts with a description of the preparations for fishing (Hal. 3.29-91). It then describes how fish escape fishermen (Hal. 3.92-168). The main portion of the book contains various techniques to capture fish through their gluttony (Hal. 3.169-528), followed by a list of fish that can be caught due to their aggression and ends with tuna fishing (Hal. 3.529-648).
- Book 4: the main theme of this book is fishing through manipulating the love and lust of fish (Hal. 4.1-449). The remainder of the book describes, among other things, frightening fish (Hal. 4.502-634) and fishing with poison (Hal. 4.647-693).
- Book 5: in many ways the grand finale of the Halieutica, as it teaches you how to catch the largest animals of the sea, including whales, sharks, and dolphins. The work is concluded by a section on the fatal outcome of sponge diving. (Hal. 5.612-680)

== Editions ==
- Editio Princeps, with Latin translation by Laurentius Lippius, Aldine edition, Venice, 1517;
- Oppianus. Poetae alieuticon, sive de piscibus, libri quinq[ue] e graeco traducti ad Antonium Imperatorem [.], authore Laurentio Lippio Collensi, interprete librorum quinq[ue] Oppiani. C. Plinii Secundi naturalis historiae libri duo [.] de naturis piscipium, in altero vero de medicinis ex aquatilibus sive piscibus. Pauli item Iovii de piscibus liber unus [.], first Johannes Caesarius edition, Strasbourg, Jacob Cammerlander, 1534;
- Oppiani de Venatione libri IV., Parisiis apud Vascosanum, 1549;
- Oppiani Anazerbei de Piscatu Libri V., de Venatione libri IV, Parisiis, 1555, apud Turnebum;
- Oppiani Poetae Cilicis de Venatione lib. IV., de Piscatu lib. V., cum interpretatione latina, comment. et indice rerum......studio et opera Conradi Rittershusii, Lugduni Bat., 1597;
- Poetae graec. veteres carmina heroici scriptores qui exstant omnes, apposita est e regione latina interpretatio......cura et recensione Iac. Lectii, Aureliae Allobrog., 1606;
- Oppiani poetae Cilicis De venatione libri IV et De piscatione libri V. cum paraphrasi graeca librorum de aucupio, graece et latine, curavit Joh. Gottlob Schneider (1776);
- F. S. Lehrs (1846);
- U. C. Bussemaker (Scholia, 1849).
- Fajen, F. 'Oppianus. Halieutica' (Berlin, 1999)

== Translations ==
- Diaper and Jones (1722, Oxford)
- A. W. Mair (1928).
