= Orphe =

Scientific classification
- Kingdom: Animalia
- Phylum: Arthropoda
- Class: Insecta
- Order: Lepidoptera
- Family: Hesperiidae
- Subtribe: Orphina
- Genus: Orphe; Godman, [1901]

Genus of butterflies

Orphe is a genus of skippers in the family Hesperiidae.

== Species ==
The following species are recognised in the genus Orphe:

- Orphe gerasa (Hewitson, [1867])
- Orphe vatinius Godman, 1901
