= Pseudo-Oppian =

Pseudo-Oppian (Ancient Greek: Ὀππιανός, Oppianós; Latin: Oppianus), sometimes referred to as Oppian of Apamea or Oppian of Syria, was a Greco-Syrian poet during the reign of the emperor Caracalla. His work, a Greek didactic epic poem on hunting called the Cynegetica (Κυνηγετικά), has been erroneously ascribed to Oppian of Anazarbus. The real name of Pseudo-Oppian is not known.

== Biography ==
There are only a few facts that can be established about the author of the Cynegetica. The poem is dedicated to the reigning emperor, Caracalla, and his mother, Julia Domna. The absence of any reference to Caracalla's brother and co-emperor Geta has led scholars to assume that the Cynegetica postdates Geta's death in 211. The Cynegetica can thus be dated somewhere between 212 and Caracalla's death in 217. Caracalla's visit to Syria in 215 may have been the occasion for the poem's composition. He also claims to have personally seen a black lion that was being sent to the emperor.

The poet also mentions his hometown. The second book of the Cynegetica contains a myth in which Heracles redirects the Orontes River. Within this tale, the narrator refers to Syrian Apamea as 'my city'.

The poem's narrator furthermore remarks that he has spoken about the woes of the Parthians and Ctesiphon, which refers to the sack of Ctesiphon by Septimius Severus in 197. This may be a reference to a lost work by the same poet.

== The Cynegetica ==
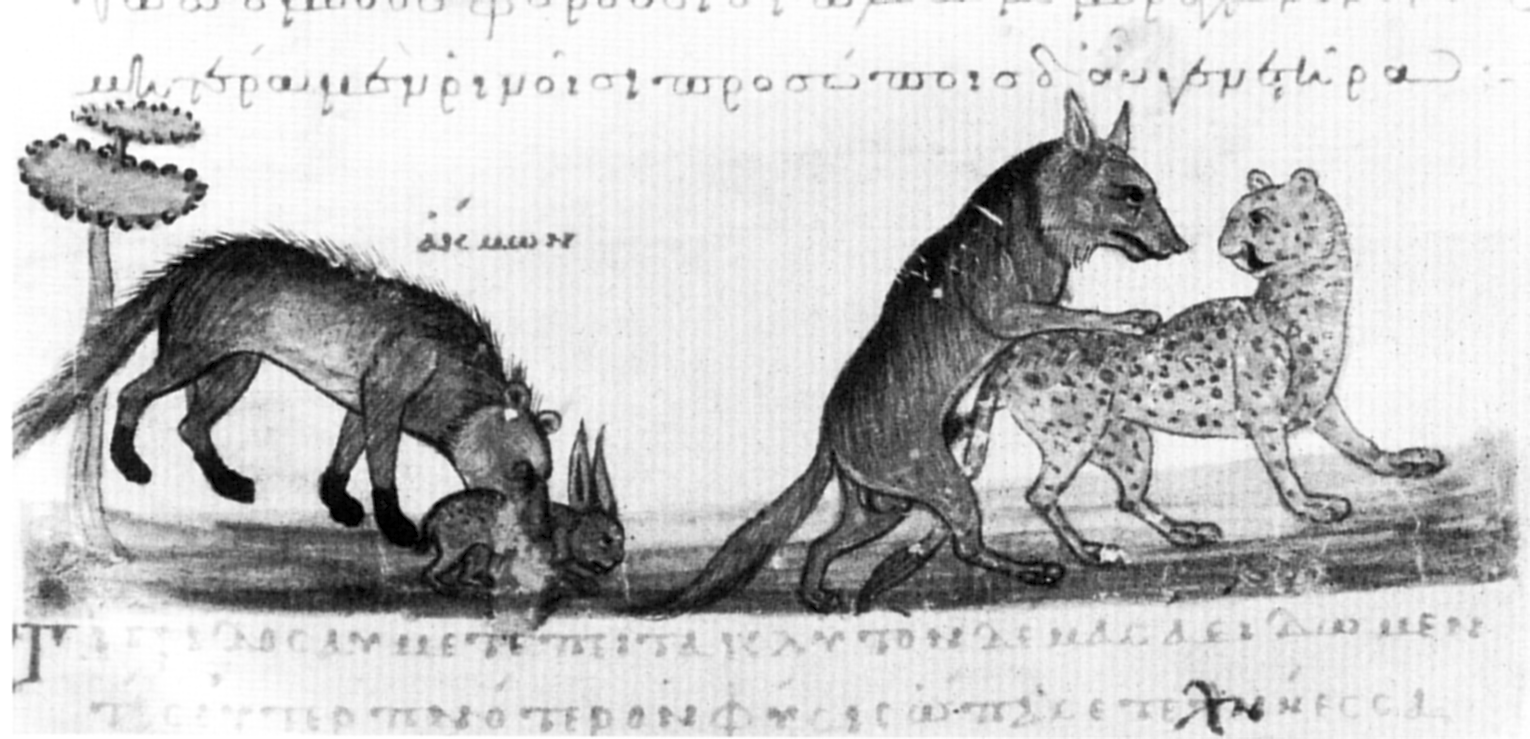
Mating of wolf and cheetah (Cod. Ven. Marc. Gr. Z 479, f. 49v), 10th-century

The Cynegetica (On Hunting) consists of about 2150 lines and is divided into four books. The fourth book ends abruptly, suggesting that the ending is lost or that the poem was never completed in the first place. The Cynegetica has often been compared unfavourably to its main model, Oppian's Halieutica, on the basis of its relative neglect of the Alexandrian metrical refinements and its highly rhetorical style.

== Ascription to Oppian ==
While Oppian's Halieutica was well-known soon after its composition, the Cynegetica is never mentioned by any ancient author. The manuscripts of the Cynegetica all ascribe the poem to Oppian of Cilicia. It was not until 1776 that the first scholar, Johann Schneider, argued that Oppian's Halieutica and the Cynegetica must have been composed by two different poets, based on the fact that the narrator of the Halieutica claims Anazarbus in Cilicia as his hometown, whereas the narrator of the Cynegetica comes from Apamea in Syria. Later scholarship has uncovered further evidence to back up this claim: there are considerable differences in the two poems' style and adherence to the metrical norms of Hellenistic scholars. The Halieutica is the main source for the Cynegetica's structure and content, with specific passages in the latter poem alluding to or reworking their model.

The most widely accepted explanation why the Cynegetica was ascribed to Oppian is that the Halieutica, Cynegetica, and a third didactic epic on fowling, the Ixeutica (Ἰξευτικά, Ixeutiká), were circulated as a complementary trio. In time, all three poems were then attributed to Oppian of Cilicia. Although some scholars have assumed that the Cynegetica's poet was also coincidentally named Oppian, there is no evidence to back up this claim. In order to distinguish the creator of the Cynegetica from Oppian of Cilicia, he is generally referred to as Pseudo-Oppian.

== Editions ==
- P. Boudreaux (1908).
- M. Papathomopoulos (2003). Oppianus Apameensis, Cynegetica. Munich.
