= Klaus Schilde =

German pianist and violinist (1926–2020)

Klaus Schilde (born 12 September 1926; died 11 December 2020) was a German pianist and violinist who has made numerous recordings, radio and TV broadcasts and produced 100 Henle urtext editions of fingerings.

== Biography ==
Schilde was born in Dresden, Germany, and played piano and violin from his childhood. He was influenced by Walter Engel who gave him piano lessons. From 1946 to 1948 he attended Leipzig Conservatory where he studied with Hugo Steurer and in 1952 he moved to Paris where he studied with Nadia Boulanger, Lucette Descaves, Walter Gieseking and Edwin Fischer, and Marguerite Long. During the Cold War he taught in such places as Tokyo, Japan, and both parts of Berlin as well as Munich; in the latter, he became a professor and then President of the Staatliche Hochschule für Musik und Theater. There, he served from 1988 to 1991.
