= Aello =

One of the Harpy sisters in Greek mythology

In Greek mythology, Aello (/eɪˈɛloʊ/; Ancient Greek: Ἀελλώ, romanized: Aellō, lit. 'whirlwind', 'tempest' or 'storm-wind') is the name of multiple figures:

- Aello, a Harpy, and the daughter of the sea god Thaumas and the Oceanid Electra. Her harpy-sisters were Ocypete and Celaeno, whereas other mentioned siblings were Iris, and possibly Arke and Hydaspes. Aello was claimed to be the mother of Achilles's immortal steeds Balius and Xanthus by Zephyrus. According to Ovid's Metamorphoses, Aello was the harpy who was encountered by Aeneas' company in their wanderings after the fall of Troy. She was also known as Aellopus, Aellope, Podarge, Podarce, and Nicothoë.
- Aello, one of Actaeon's dogs who destroyed their master when he was changed into a stag by the goddess of hunt, Artemis.
