= Arke =

Daughter of Thaumas in Greek mythology

- Messenger goddess
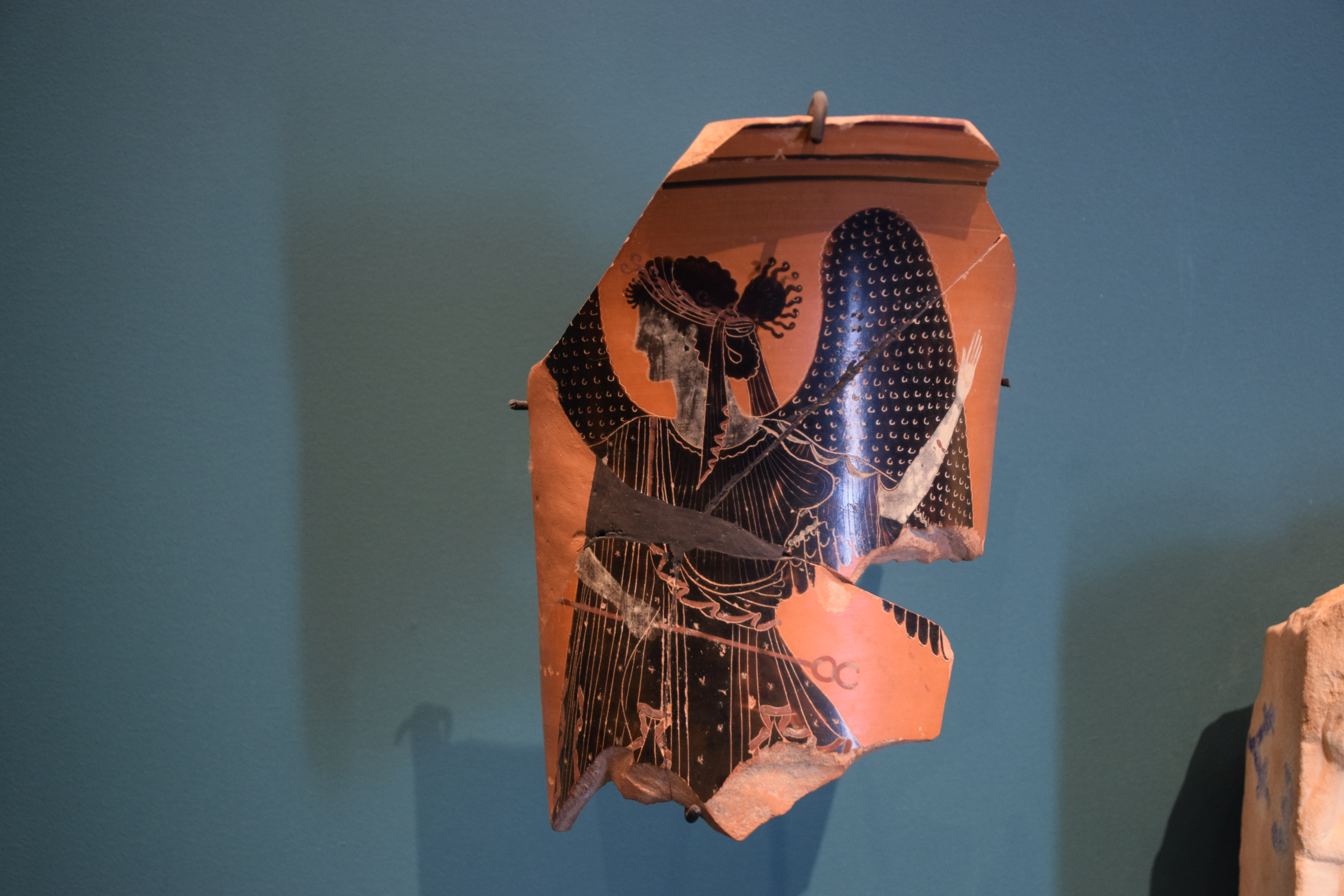
- A winged goddess with a caduceus on a Greek fragmentary black-figure vase from Eleusis.
- Abode: Tartarus

Genealogy
- Parents: Thaumas (Note: The mother of Iris is the Oceanid nymph Electra, but she is not confirmed to have been Arke's as well.)
- Siblings: Iris, Harpies: Aello (Podarge), Celaeno, and Ocypete, and possibly Hydaspes

In Greek mythology, Arke or Arce (Ancient Greek: Ἄρκη, romanized: Árkē, lit. 'swift') is one of the daughters of Thaumas, and sister to the rainbow goddess Iris. During the Titanomachy, Arke fled from the Olympians' camp and joined the Titans, unlike Iris who remained loyal to Zeus and his allies. After the war was over and the Titans with their allies were defeated, Zeus cut off her wings and cast Arke into Tartarus to be kept imprisoned for all eternity.

== Family and attributes ==
The goddess Arke was born to Thaumas, a minor god; no mother of hers is mentioned anywhere. She and her sister Iris were both messenger deities; Iris is notably also the goddess of the rainbow, but unlike her, Arke has no established connection to rainbows. Like Iris however Arke also sported wings which might be a nod to some primeval force or element she represented, but it is not clear what that would be.

== Mythology ==
According to Ptolemy Hephaestion, during the divine war known as the Titanomachy Arke and Iris originally sided with the Olympian gods, but soon after Arke betrayed them for the Titans and flew to their camp to become their own messenger-goddess, while Iris remained loyal as the Olympian gods' messenger.

When the Olympians eventually prevailed over their enemies, their leader Zeus punished Arke severely for her defection. She was deprived of her wings and cast into the deep pit called Tartarus, together with the vanquished Titans. Arke's torn wings were later given to Peleus and Thetis as a gift on their wedding day; Thetis in turn later gave them to her son Achilles, which is thought to be the derivation of his surname Podarces (literally "swift-footed", as if from πούς, gen. ποδός "foot" + the name of Arke).

In Eumelus of Corinth's lost epic poem the Titanomachy which chronicled the battle between the Olympians and the Titans, it seems that the messenger of the Titans was called Ithas or Ithax, a figure that was identified with Prometheus.

== Genealogy ==
Descendants of Gaia and Pontus

Gaia	Pontus
Nereus	Doris	Thaumas	Phorcys	Ceto	Eurybia
The Nereids	Iris	Harpies	ARKE
Pemphredo	Enyo	Echidna?	(Ladon)
The Graiai
Sthenno	Euryale	Medusa	Poseidon
The Gorgons
Pegasus	Chrysaor	Callirhoe
Geryon

== See also ==
- Atlas – Deity in Greek mythology
- Caduceus – Staff carried by Hermes in Greek mythology
- Hermes – Ancient Greek deity and herald of the gods
- Podarge – Harpy in Greek mythology

== Bibliography ==
- Bell, Robert E. (1991). Women of Classical Mythology: A Biographical Dictionary. ABC-Clio. ISBN 9780874365818.
- Hesiod, Theogony, in The Homeric Hymns and Homerica with an English Translation by Hugh G. Evelyn-White, Cambridge, MA., Harvard University Press; London, William Heinemann Ltd. 1914. Online version at the Perseus Digital Library.
- Hard, Robin (2004). The Routledge Handbook of Greek Mythology: Based on H.J. Rose's "Handbook of Greek Mythology". Routledge. ISBN 9780415186360.
- Hiller von Gaertringen, Friedrich, "Arke (2)", in Realencyclopädie der classischen Altertumswissenschaft, Band II, Halbband 1, edited by Georg Wissowa, Stuttgart, J. B. Metzler, 1895. Wikisource.
- Kerenyi, Karl (1951). The Gods of the Greeks. New York, London: Thames and Hudson, New York.
- Lemprière, John (1904). A Classical Dictionary: Greek and Roman Literature. London, UK: George Routledge and Sons.
- Photius, Bibliotheca excerpts, sections 1-166 translated by John Henry Freese, from the SPCK edition of 1920, now in the public domain, and other brief excerpts from subsequent sections translated by Roger Pearse (from the French translation by René Henry, ed. Les Belles Lettres).
- Smith, William (1873). A Dictionary of Greek and Roman Biography and Mythology. London, UK: John Murray, printed by Spottiswoode and Co. Online version at the Perseus.tufts library.
