= Pieria (Greek myth) =

Women in Greek mythology

In Greek mythology, Pieria (/ˌpaɪˈɪəriə/; Ancient Greek: Πιερία, romanized: Piería) is the name of several women. Pieria can refer to one of the following:

- Pieria, the wife of king Oxylus in Elis and mother by him of two sons, Aetolus and Laias. In the second century AD the traveller Pausanias noted that 'nothing more of her is recorded.'
- Pieria, the daughter of Pythes and Iapygia, distinguished citizens from the Greek city of Myus in Caria. The people of Myus were at a constant state of hostility with those from Miletus. Pieria went at Miletus to celebrate a festival of Artemis called Neleis, and there she met Phrygius, the king of the city, who became smitten with her. When he asked her how he might serve her, Pieria replied that she wished to be able to come to Miletus more often and bring people with her. Phrygius understood that she meant she wanted the hostilities to end, and thus he made peace with Myus. The love story of Phrygius and Pieria was famous in Miletus, and the women of the city would pray that their husbands loved them as much as Phrygius did Pieria.
- Pieria, one of the wives of King Danaus of Libya and mother of six Danaïdes: Actaea, Podarce, Dioxippe, Adite, Ocypete and Pylarge.

== Bibliography ==
- Apollodorus, The Library, with an English Translation by Sir James George Frazer, F.B.A., F.R.S. in 2 Volumes. Cambridge, MA, Harvard University Press; London, William Heinemann Ltd. 1921. Online version at the Perseus Digital Library.
- Pausanias, Description of Greece with an English Translation by W.H.S. Jones, Litt.D., and H.A. Ormerod, M.A., in 4 Volumes. Cambridge, MA, Harvard University Press; London, William Heinemann Ltd. 1918. Online version at the Perseus Digital Library.
- Plutarch, Mulierum Virtutes in Moralia, with an English Translation by Frank Cole Babbitt. Cambridge, MA. Harvard University Press. London. William Heinemann Ltd. 1931. Available online at Perseus Digital Library.
- Polyaenus, Stratagems of War, with an English translation by E. Shepherd, 1793. Online text at attalus.org.
