= Ocypete (mythology) =

In Greek mythology, Ocypete (Ancient Greek: Ὠκυπέτη, romanized: Ōkypetē or Okypete, lit. 'swift wing' or 'swift flyer') may refer to the following characters:

- Ocypete, one of the three Harpies and the fastest among them. She is a daughter of Thaumas and Electra.
- Ocypete, one of the 50 Danaïdes as a daughter of King Danaus of Libya (and later Argos) and Pieria. On the orders of her father, she married and murdered her cousin–husband Lampus, namesake of his father King Aegyptus of Egypt and Gorgo.
- Ocypete, listed as one of Actaeon's dogs who mangled him after being transformed into a stag by Artemis.
