= Chrysippus (disambiguation) =

Chrysippus (Greek: Χρύσιππος), or Chrysippus of Soli (c. 280 - c. 207 BC), was a Stoic philosopher.

Chrysippus may also refer to:

- Chrysippus of Cnidos (4th century BC), Greek physician
- Chrysippus of Tyana, Greek writer on gastronomy
- Chrysippus of Jerusalem (or of Cappadocia) (5th century AD), Greek religious writer
- Chrysippus of Mallus at the Council of Chalcedon
- Chrysippus (mythology), several figures in Greek mythology, including:
  - Chrysippus of Elis (or of Pisa), illegitimate son of Pelops abducted by Laius
- Chrysippus, a lost play by Euripides about Chrysippus of Elis

== See also ==
- Chrysippe
