= Ocypete =

One of the Harpies in Greek mythology

Ocypete (Ancient Greek: Ὠκυπέτη, romanized: Ōkypetē or Okypete, lit. 'swift wing' or 'swift flyer') was one of the three Harpies in Greek mythology. She was also known as Ocypode (Ὠκυπόδη means "swift foot") or Ocythoe (Ὠκυθόη means "swift runner"). The Harpies were the daughters of the sea god Thaumas and the Oceanid Electra. Her harpy-sisters were Aello (Podarge) and Celaeno, whereas other mentioned siblings were Iris, and possibly Arke and Hydaspes. In other accounts, Harpies were called the progeny of Typhoeus, father of these monsters, or of Pontus (Sea) and Gaea (Earth) or of Poseidon, god of the sea.

== Mythology ==
According to one story, the Harpies were chased by the Boreads. Though the swiftest of the trio, Ocypete became exhausted, landed on an island in the middle of the ocean and begged for mercy from the gods. In Greek and Roman mythology, the Harpies were creatures employed by the higher gods to carry out punishments for crimes.
