= Adite =

In Greek mythology, Adite (Ancient Greek: Ἀδίτη, romanized: Aditē) was one of the 50 Danaïdes, daughters of Danaus, king of Libya (and later of Argos).

== Family ==
Adite's mother was Pieria and thus, sister to Actaea, Podarce, Dioxippe, Ocypete and Pylarge.

== Mythology ==
Adite and her sisters were forced into a mass marriage with their fifty cousins — the sons of King Aegyptus of Egypt. Like her other 48 sisters (saved Hypermnestra), on the wedding night under her father's orders, Adite killed her husband Menalces, son of Aegyptus by Gorgo.

As punishment in Tartarus, she is forced to carry water in a leaky jar or bowl to fill a bottomless tub—an endless task repeated for eternity.
