= Iapygia =

Iapygia may refer to:

- Iapygia quadrangle, a region of Mars
- Iapygians, an ancient people from Italy who lived in the region Iapygia
- Iapygia, a woman in Greek mythology, wife of Pythes and mother of Pieria.
