= Chrysippe =

Disambiguation page

The name Chrysippe is the feminine form of Chrysippus, see Chrysippus (disambiguation).

In Greek mythology, the name Chrysippe (Ancient Greek: Χρυσίππη, romanized: Khrusíppē, lit. 'golden mare') may refer to:

- Chrysippe, daughter of Danaus and Memphis, who married and killed Chrysippus, son of Aegyptus and Tyria.
- Chrysippe, daughter of Irus. With Phthius, son of Achaeus, she became mother of Hellen (not to be confused with Hellen, son of Deucalion), who gave his name to Hellas, a city in Thessaly.
- Chrysippe, daughter of Hydaspes of Punjab. Through the wrath of Aphrodite, she fell in love with her own father and, with the help of her nurse, lay with him unrecognized. When Hydaspes realized what had happened, he crucified his daughter and buried her nurse alive. Soon after that, overcome with grief, he threw himself into the river Indus (presumably not the same as the Indian river commonly known as Indus), which was said to have been renamed Hydaspes after him.
