= Phrygius =

King in Greek mythology

In Greek mythology, Phrygius (Ancient Greek: Φρύγιος, romanized: Phrúgios) is one of the Neleids, and king of Miletus following Phobius. Phrygius ended a long-lasting war with the people of Myus.

== Mythology ==
Phrygius received the throne of Miletus from the previous king, Phobius. Phobius abdicated after his wife Cleoboea committed suicide following her cold murder of their guest Antheus, who had rejected her advances; Phobius interpreted those events as a bad omen for his reign.

As king, Phrygius fell in love with Pieria (Ancient Greek: Πιερία), the daughter of Pythes from Myus, at a festival of Artemis. He promised anything to have her hand, and Pieria asked for peace between the two cities, which were at war. In this way, the hostility between Miletus and Myus stopped.
