= Aetolus (mythology) =

Greek mythological figures

In Greek mythology, Aetolus (/iːˈtoʊləs/; Ancient Greek: Αἰτωλός Aitolos) was the name of the following figures:

- Aetolus, eponym of Aetolia and king of Elis.
- Aetolus, father of Palaemon, who was counted among the Argonauts. The latter was also called the son of Hephaestus or Lernus of Olenus.
- Aetolus, son of Oxylus, the man who helped the Heraclidae, and of Pieria and brother Laias. Aetolus died before his parents, and they buried him in a tomb in the gate leading to Olympia because an oracle forbade the corpse to be laid either outside the city or within it. The gymnasiarch of Elis used to offer an annual sacrifice on his tomb as late as the time of Pausanias.
