= Oxylus (son of Haemon) =

Greek mythological figure

Oxylus (/ˈɒksɪləs/; Ancient Greek: Ὄξυλος Oxulos), was a mythical king of Elis, who came from Aetolia and was son of Haemon (himself son of Thoas) or of Andraemon.

== Mythology ==
Oxylus was exiled from Aetolia on account of unintentional homicide; his victim was either his own brother Therimus or a certain Alcidocus, son of Scopius. In his wanderings, he met Temenus, son of Aristomachus, on a road. Temenus had been told by an oracle to look out for a man with three eyes, and since Oxylus was riding a horse or mule with one eye, he matched that description. Oxylus then, as the oracle had recommended, accompanied Temenus and his brother, Cresphontes, in their invasion of the Peloponnese. He advised them to invade the Peloponnese by ship, sailing from Naupactus to Molycrium. For his aid, Oxylus asked to be given Elis, a fertile land, as his own.

Since Oxylus suspected that the Dorians would not give Elis to him, when they saw how fertile it was, he led them through Arcadia and not Elis. Nevertheless, Pausanias says that he did have to fight over the land with the Dorian Dius. The latter proposed that each side chose a single soldier to represent his army. Degmenus, an archer, fought for Dius and Pyraechmes, a slinger, for Oxylus; the latter won, and Oxylus received Elis as his domain. Strabo tells the same story, but says that the opponent was the native Epeans. Polyaenus calls the archer Aeschines rather than Degmenus.

After gaining control of Elis, Oxylus settled Aetolians there and allowed Dius to settle with special rights. Pausanias says that Oxylus allowed the Epeans to stay too and maintained the existing cults; Strabo says that he drove the Epeans out. He allowed Dius to settle there as well, and brought the people from the surrounding villages into the city, thus becoming the city's founder. In accordance with a prophecy of the oracle, he brought in Agorius, great-grandson of Orestes and thus a descendant of Pelops, as a co-founder. The land became prosperous under him. The Dorians swore an oath never to invade Elis, which Strabo presents as a precursor of the Olympic truce and the reason why Elis had no city walls. This truce lasted until the time of Pheidon of Argos.

== Descendants ==
By his wife Pieria, Oxylus had two sons: Aetolus, who died before his parents and was buried next to the gate leading to Olympia, and Laias, who inherited the kingdom after him. A descendant, Iphitus, re-established the Olympic Games, an event connected by some authors with the first Olympiad in 779 BC. A family claiming descent from Oxylus is attested at Elis from the fourth century BC until AD 157.
