= Iris (mythology) =

Ancient Greek personification of the rainbow

- Goddess of the Rainbow
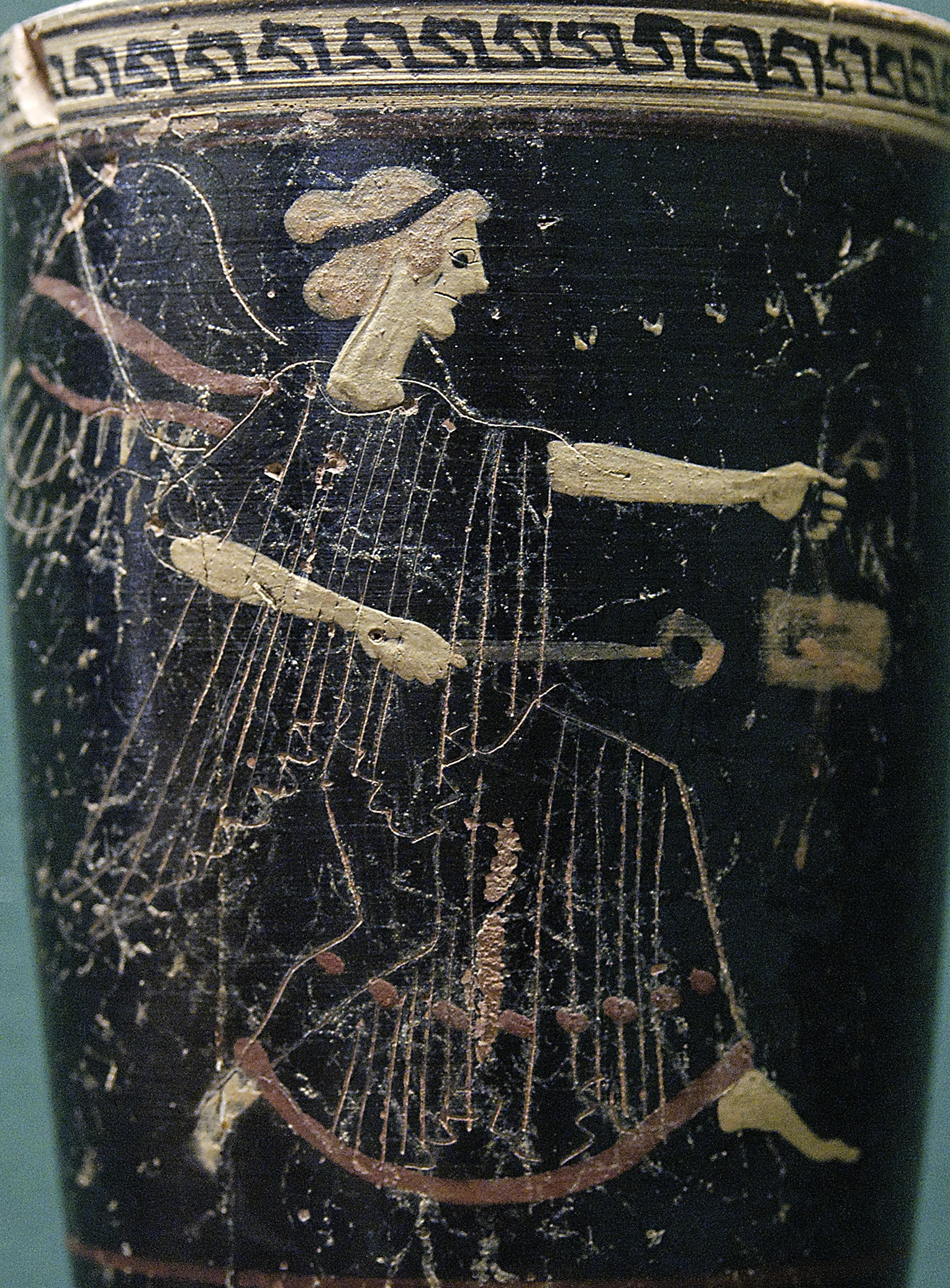
- Iris, Attic lekythos in Six's technique (superposed colours), circa 500–490 BC, found in Tanagra, now in Louvre.
- Abode: Mount Olympus
- Symbol: Rainbow, caduceus, pitcher

Genealogy
- Parents: Thaumas and Electra
- Siblings: Arke, Harpies, Hydaspes
- Consort: Zephyrus
- Offspring: Eros, Pothos

In ancient Greek religion and mythology, Iris (/ˈaɪrɪs/; EYE-riss; Ancient Greek: Ἶρις, romanized: Îris, lit. 'rainbow,' Ancient Greek: [îːris]) is a daughter of the gods Thaumas and Electra, and the personification of the rainbow. She functions as a messenger and servant to the Olympians, particularly Hera. Iris was traditionally seen as the consort of Zephyrus, the god of the west wind and one of the four Anemoi, by whom she is the mother of Pothos in some texts.

While Iris appears in several stories running errands or carrying messages to and from the gods, she has no unique mythology of her own. There are only a few traces of archaic worship and cultic activity on the island of Delos, and mentions of her worship are scant in surviving records. In ancient art, Iris was depicted as a winged young woman carrying a caduceus, the symbol of messengers, and a pitcher of water for the gods.

== Etymology ==
The ancient Greek noun Ἶρις means both the rainbow and the halo of the Moon. An inscription from Corinth provides evidence for an original form Ϝῖρις (Wîris) with a digamma that was eventually dropped. The noun appears to be of pre-Greek in origin. A Proto-Indo-European pre-form *uh_{2}i-r-i- has been suggested as well, although Beekes finds it "hard to motivate".

== Family ==
According to Hesiod's Theogony, Iris is the daughter of Thaumas and the Oceanid Electra and the sister of the Harpies: Arke and Ocypete. According to the Dionysiaca of Nonnus, Iris' brother was the river god Hydaspes.

Zephyrus, who is the god of the west wind, is often said to be her consort. Together they had a son named Pothos. Alternatively they were the parents of Eros, the god of love, according to sixth century BC Greek lyric poet Alcaeus, though Eros is usually said to be the son of Aphrodite.

== Mythology ==
=== Titanomachy ===
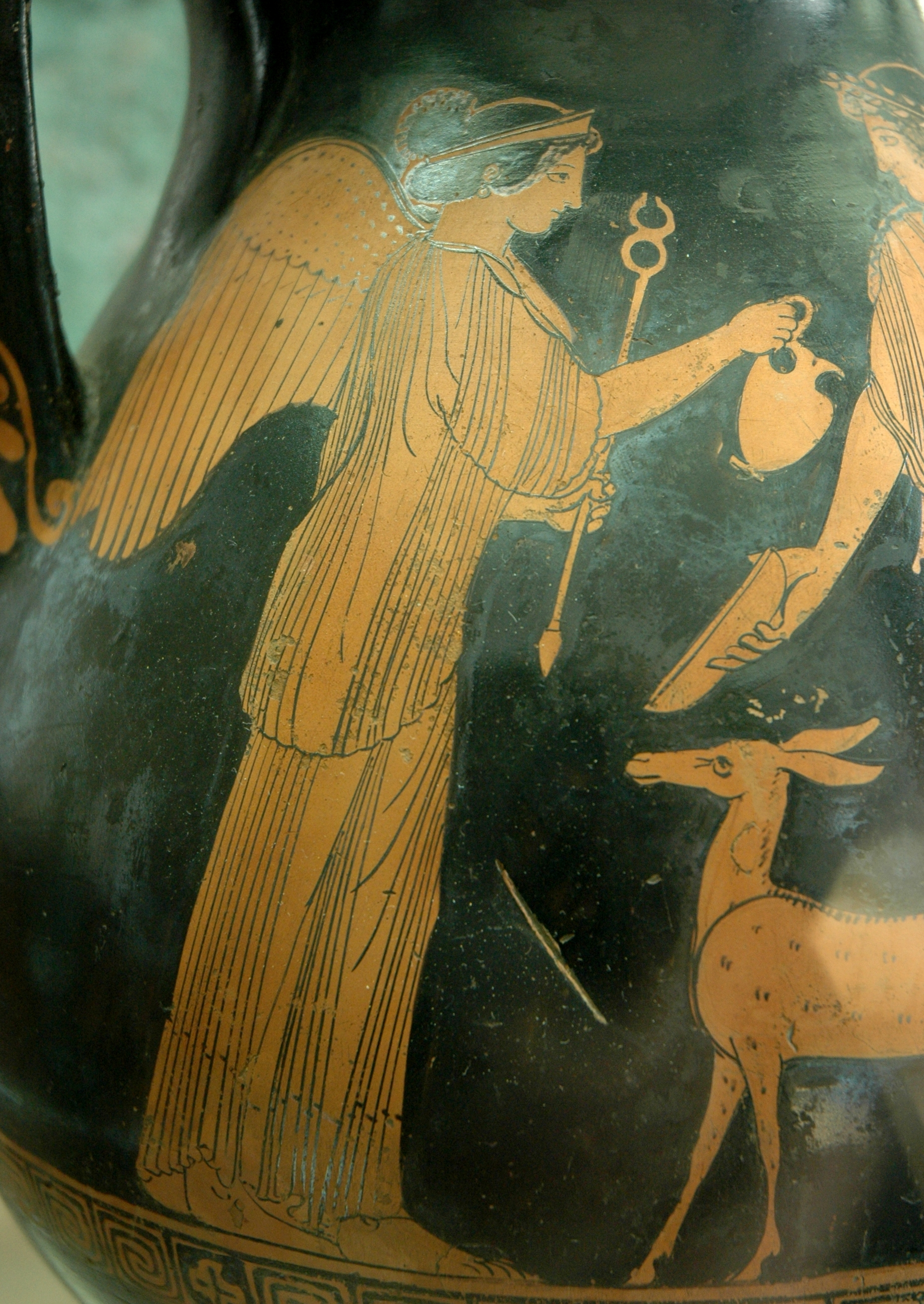
Winged female figure holding a caduceus: Iris (messenger of the gods) or Nike (Victory)

Iris is said to travel on the rainbow while carrying messages from the gods to mortals. In some records, Iris is a sister to fellow messenger goddess Arke ("swift", "quick"); both sisters originally sided with the Olympian gods during the Titanomachy, but Arke eventually joined the Titans as their own messenger goddess, so the two sisters found each other in opposite camps during the battle.

After the war was won by the Olympian leader Zeus and his allies, Zeus punished Arke by tearing her wings off and gifting them to the Nereid Thetis at her wedding to Peleus, who in turn gave them to her son, Achilles, who wore them on his feet. Achilles was sometimes known as podarkes (feet like [the wings of] Arke). Iris, on the other hand, maintained her position as the messenger of the gods alongside Hermes, and often served as Hera's personal messenger and servant.

=== Messenger of the gods ===
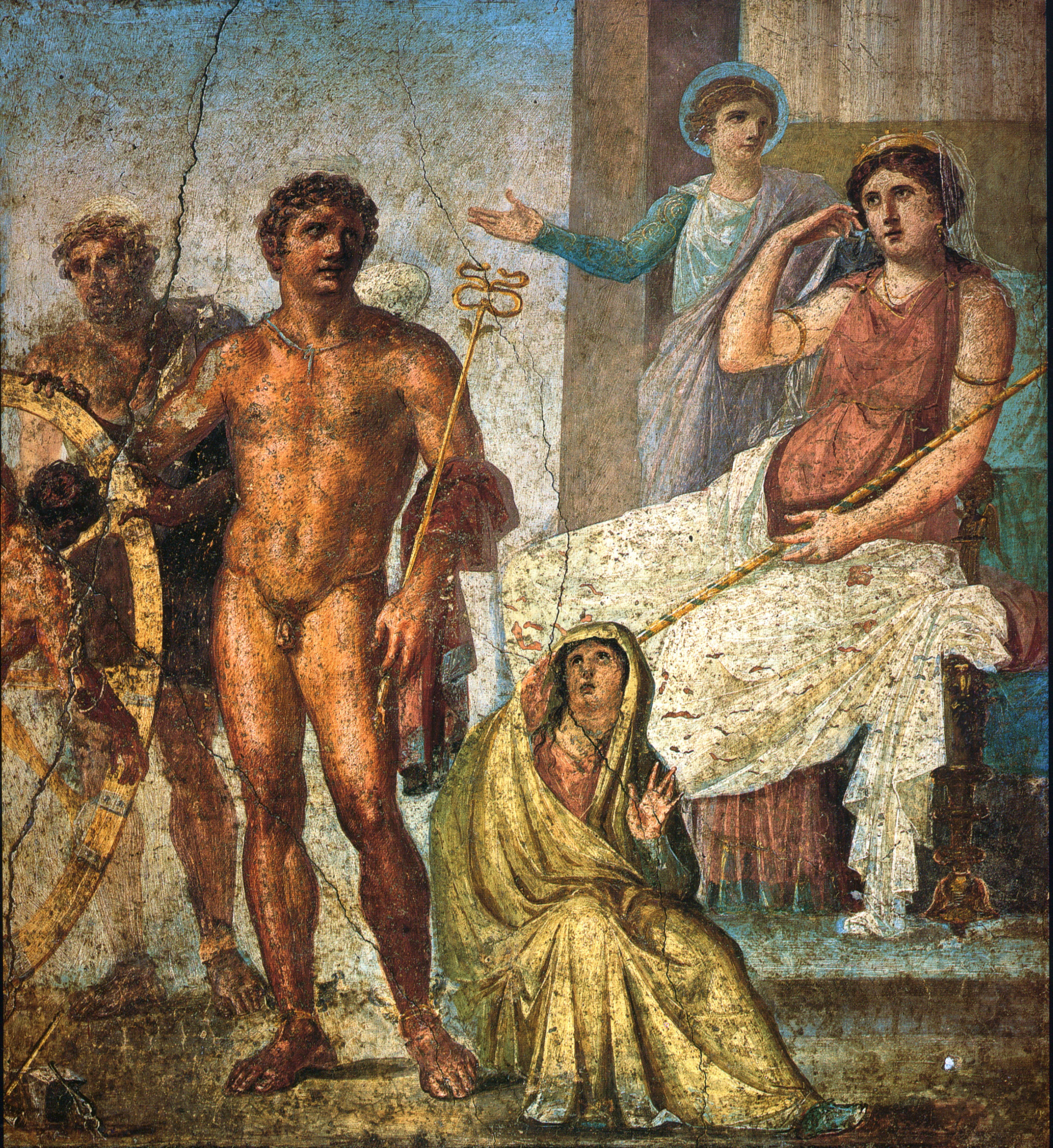
Iris stands behind the seated Juno (right) in a Pompeii fresco

Following her daughter Persephone's abduction by Hades, the goddess of agriculture Demeter withdrew to her temple in Eleusis and made the earth barren. This caused a great famine, and as a result, mortals ceased making offerings to the gods. Zeus then sent Iris to Demeter to ask if she would rejoin the gods on Olympus and lift her curse, but she refused as Persephone had not yet been returned.

In one narrative, after Leto and her children pleaded with Zeus to release Prometheus from his torment, Zeus relented, and sent Iris to order Heracles to free the unfortunate Prometheus.

After Ceyx drowned in a shipwreck, Hera made Iris convey her orders to Hypnos, the god of sleep. Iris flew and found him in his cave, and informed him that Hera wished for Ceyx's wife, Alcyone, to be informed of her loved one's death in her dreams. After delivering Hera's command, Iris left immediately, not able to tolerate being near Hypnos for too long, for his powers were taking hold of her and making her dizzy and sleepy.

In Aristophanes's comedy The Birds, the titular birds build a city in the sky and plan to supplant the Olympian gods. Iris, as their messenger, goes to meet them, but she is ridiculed, insulted, and threatened with rape by their leader Pisetaerus, an elderly Athenian man. Iris appears confused that Pisetearus does not know who the gods are and that she is one of them. Pisetaerus then tells her that the birds are the gods now, the deities whom the humans must sacrifice to. After Pisetaerus threatens to rape her, Iris scolds him for his foul language and leaves, warning him that Zeus, whom she refers to as her father, will deal with him and make him pay.

Iris also appears several times in Virgil's Aeneid, usually as an agent of Juno. In Book 4, Juno dispatches her to pluck a lock of hair from the head of Queen Dido, so that she may die and enter the Underworld. In book 5, Iris, having taken on the form of a Trojan woman, stirs up the other Trojan mothers to set fire to four of Aeneas' ships in order to prevent them from leaving Sicily.

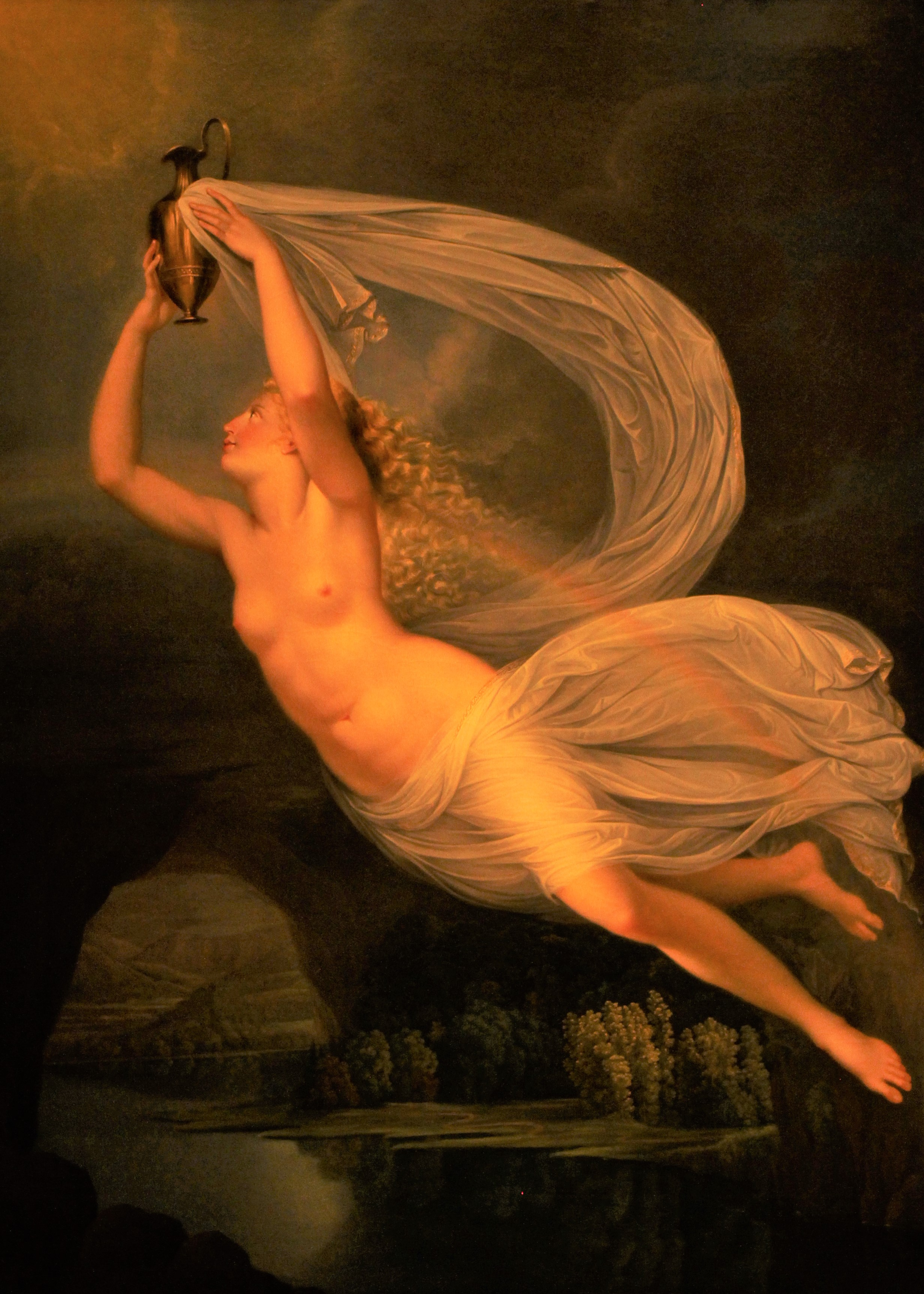
Iris Carrying the Water of the River Styx to Olympus for the Gods to Swear By, by Guy Head (c. 1793)

According to the Roman poet Ovid, after Romulus was deified as the god Quirinus, his wife Hersilia pleaded with the gods to let her become immortal as well so that she could be with her husband once again. Juno heard her plea and sent Iris down to her. With a single finger, Iris touched Hersilia and transformed her into an immortal goddess. Hersilia flew to Olympus, where she became one of the Horae and was permitted to live with her husband forevermore.

=== Trojan War ===
According to the lost epic Cypria by Stasinus, it was Iris who informed Menelaus, who had sailed off to Crete, of what had happened back in Sparta while he was gone, namely his wife Helen's elopement with the Trojan Prince Paris as well as the death of Helen's brother Castor.

Iris is frequently mentioned as a divine messenger in The Iliad, which is attributed to Homer. She does not, however, appear in The Odyssey. Like Hermes, Iris carries a caduceus or winged staff. By command of Zeus, she carries a ewer of water from the River Styx, with which she puts to sleep all who perjure themselves. In Book XXIII, she delivers Achilles's prayer to Boreas and Zephyrus to light the funeral pyre of Patroclus. In the last book, Zeus sends Iris to King Priam, to tell him that he should go to the Achaean camp alone and ransom the body of his slain son Hector from Achilles. Iris swiftly delivers the message to Priam and returns to Olympus.

=== Other myths ===
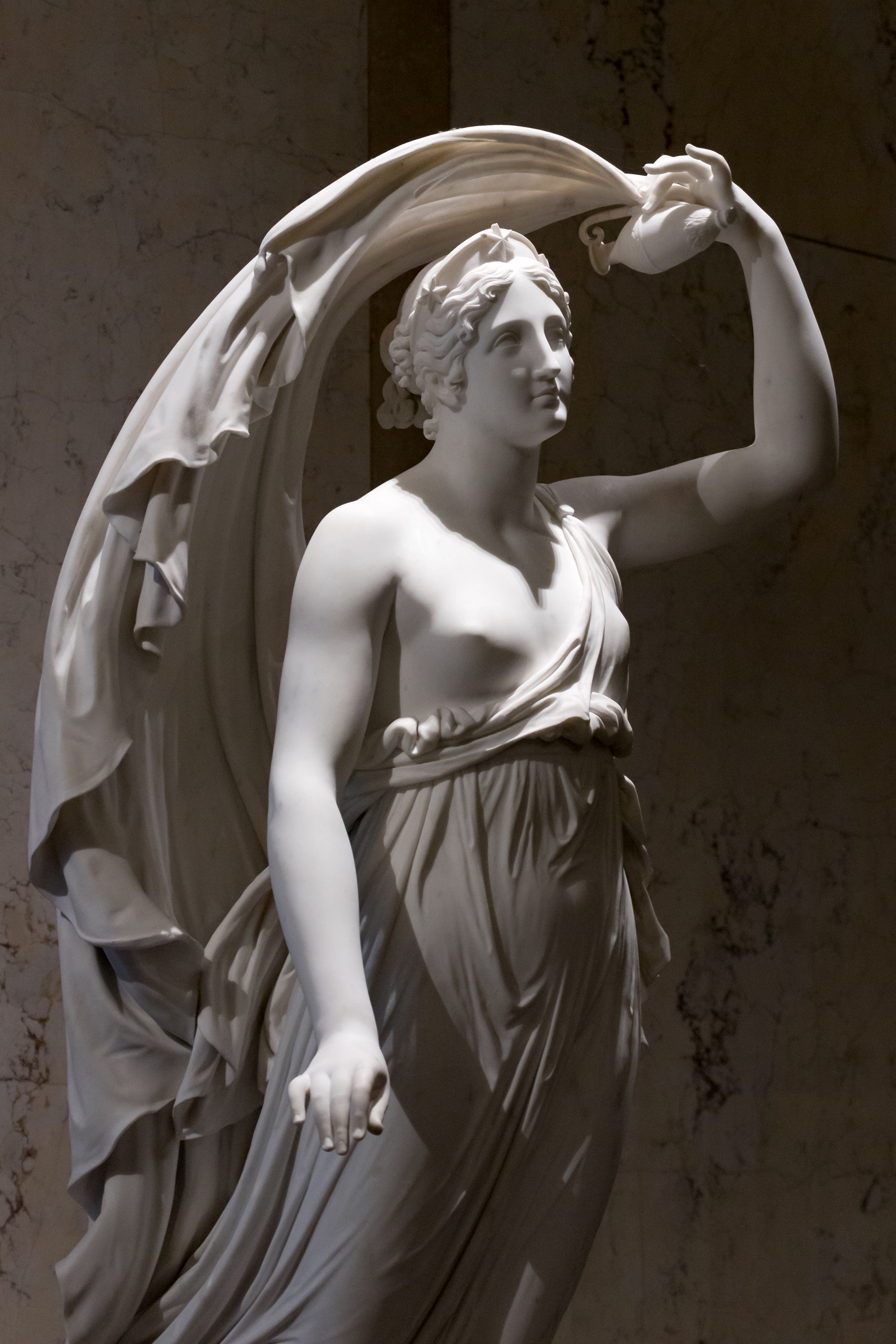
Iris as goddess of the rainbow by Gaetano Matteo Monti (1841, marble) at Kunsthistorisches Museum in Vienna, Austria.

According to the Homeric Hymn to Apollo, when Leto was in labor prior to giving birth to her twin children Apollo and Artemis, all the goddesses were in attendance except for two, Hera and Eileithyia, the goddess of childbirth. On the ninth day of her labor, Leto told Iris to bribe Eileithyia and ask for her help in giving birth to her children, without allowing Hera to find out. According to Callimachus, Iris along with Ares ordered, on Hera's orders, all cities and other places to shun the pregnant Leto and deny her shelter where she could bring forth her twins. After Asteria, now transformed into the island of Delos, offered shelter to Leto, Iris flew back to Hera to inform her that Leto had been allowed to give birth due to Asteria defying Hera's orders, and took her seat beside Hera.

According to Apollonius Rhodius, Iris turned back the Argonauts Zetes and Calais, who had pursued the Harpies to the Strophades ("Islands of Turning"). The brothers had driven off the monsters from their torment of the prophet Phineus, but did not kill them upon the request of Iris, who promised that Phineus would not be bothered by the Harpies again.

After King Creon of Thebes forbade the burial of the dead Argive soldiers who had raised their arms against Thebes, Hera ordered Iris to moisturize their dead bodies with dew and ambrosia.

In a lesser-known narrative, Iris once came close to being raped by the satyrs after she attempted to disrupt their worship of Dionysus, perhaps at the behest of Hera. About fifteen black-and-red-figure vase paintings dating from the fifth century BC depict said satyrs either menacingly advancing toward or getting hold of her when she tries to interfere with the sacrifice. In another cup, Iris is depicted being assaulted by the satyrs, who apparently are trying to prevent Iris from stealing sacrificial meat from the altar of Dionysus, who is also present in the scene. On the other side, the satyrs are attacking Hera, who stands between Hermes and Heracles. The ancient playwright Achaeus wrote Iris, a now lost satyr play, which might have been the source of those vases' subject.

In Euripides' play Heracles Gone Mad, Iris appears alongside Lyssa, the goddess of madness and insanity, cursing Heracles with the fit of madness in which he kills his three sons and his wife Megara. Iris also prepared the bed of Zeus and Hera.

== Worship ==
=== Cult ===
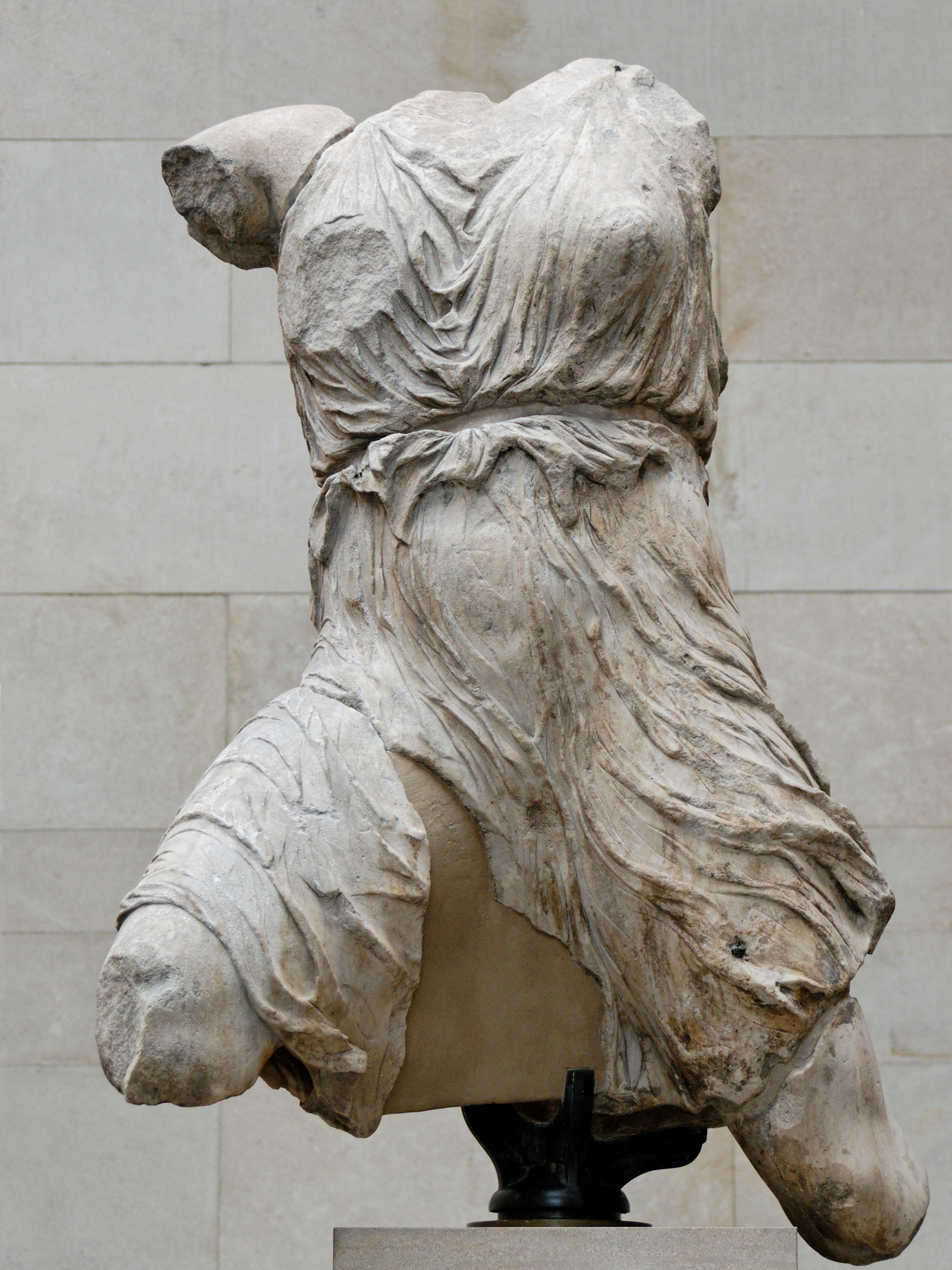
Iris, sculpture from the west pediment of the Parthenon, now at the British Museum.

Unlike the other prominent messenger god of the Greeks, Hermes, Iris did not play a large part in the ancient Greek religion and was rarely worshipped. There are no known temples, shrines, or sanctuaries to Iris, or festivals held in her honour. While she is frequently depicted on vases and in bas-reliefs, few statues are known to have been made of Iris during antiquity. She was however depicted in sculpture on the west pediment of Parthenon in Athens.

Iris does appear to have been the object of at least some minor worship, but the only trace preserved of her cult is the note by Athenaeus in Scholars at Dinner that the people of Delos sacrificed to Iris, offering her cheesecakes called basyniae, a type of cake of wheat-flour, suet, and honey, boiled up together.

=== Epithets ===
Iris had numerous poetic titles and epithets, including chrysopteros (χρυσόπτερος "golden winged"), podas ōkea (πόδας ὠκέα "swift footed") or podēnemos ōkea (ποδήνεμος ὠκέα "swift wind-footed"), roscida ("dewy", Latin), and Thaumantias or Thaumantis (Θαυμαντιάς, Θαυμαντίς, "Daughter of Thaumas, Wondrous One"), aellopus (ἀελλόπους "storm-footed"). She also watered the clouds with her pitcher, obtaining the water from the sea.

== Representation ==
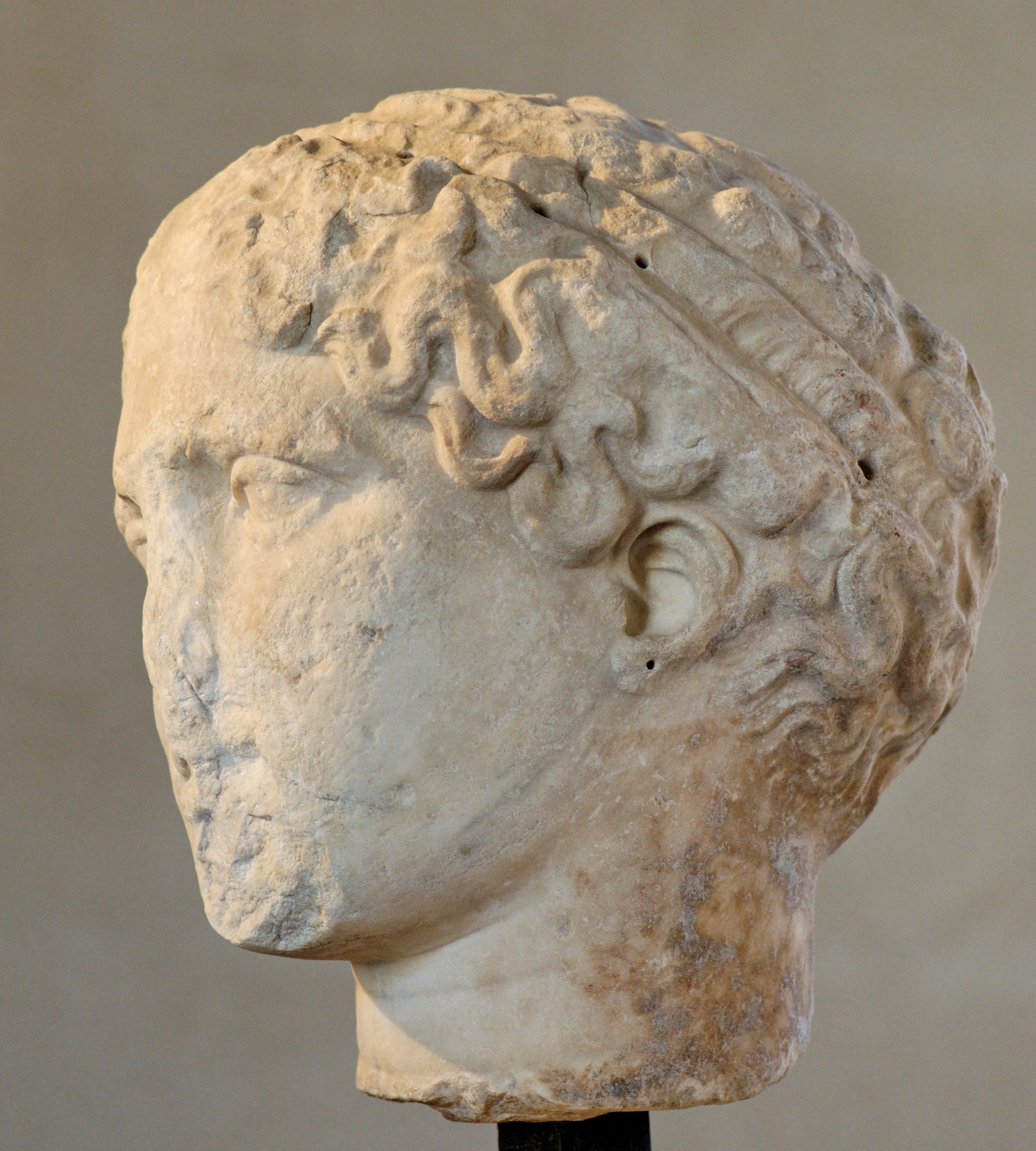
Weber-Laborde head Louvre, possibly the head of Iris.

Iris is represented either as a rainbow or as a beautiful young maiden with wings on her shoulders. As a goddess, Iris is associated with communication, messages, the rainbow, and new endeavors. This personification of a rainbow was once described as being a link between the heavens and earth.

In some texts she is depicted wearing a coat of many colors. With this coat she actually creates the rainbows she rides to get from place to place. Iris' wings were said to be so beautiful that she could even light up a dark cavern, a trait observable from the story of her visit to Somnus in order to relay a message to Alcyone.

While Iris was principally associated with communication and messages, she was also believed to aid in the fulfillment of humans' prayers, either by fulfilling them herself or by bringing them to the attention of other deities.

== Genealogy ==
Descendants of Gaia and Pontus

Gaia	Pontus
Nereus	Doris	Thaumas	Electra	Phorcys	Ceto	Eurybia
The Nereids	IRIS	Aello	Ocypete
The Harpies
Pemphredo	Enyo	Echidna?	(Ladon)
The Graiai
Sthenno	Euryale	Medusa	Poseidon
The Gorgons
Pegasus	Chrysaor	Callirhoe
Geryon

== In the sciences ==
- The plant iris was named after her due to the wide variety of colours its flowers have.
- 7 Iris, a main-belt asteroid named after this goddess.
- The chemical element iridium was named after Iris for its colorful salts.

== Gallery ==
Iris in art

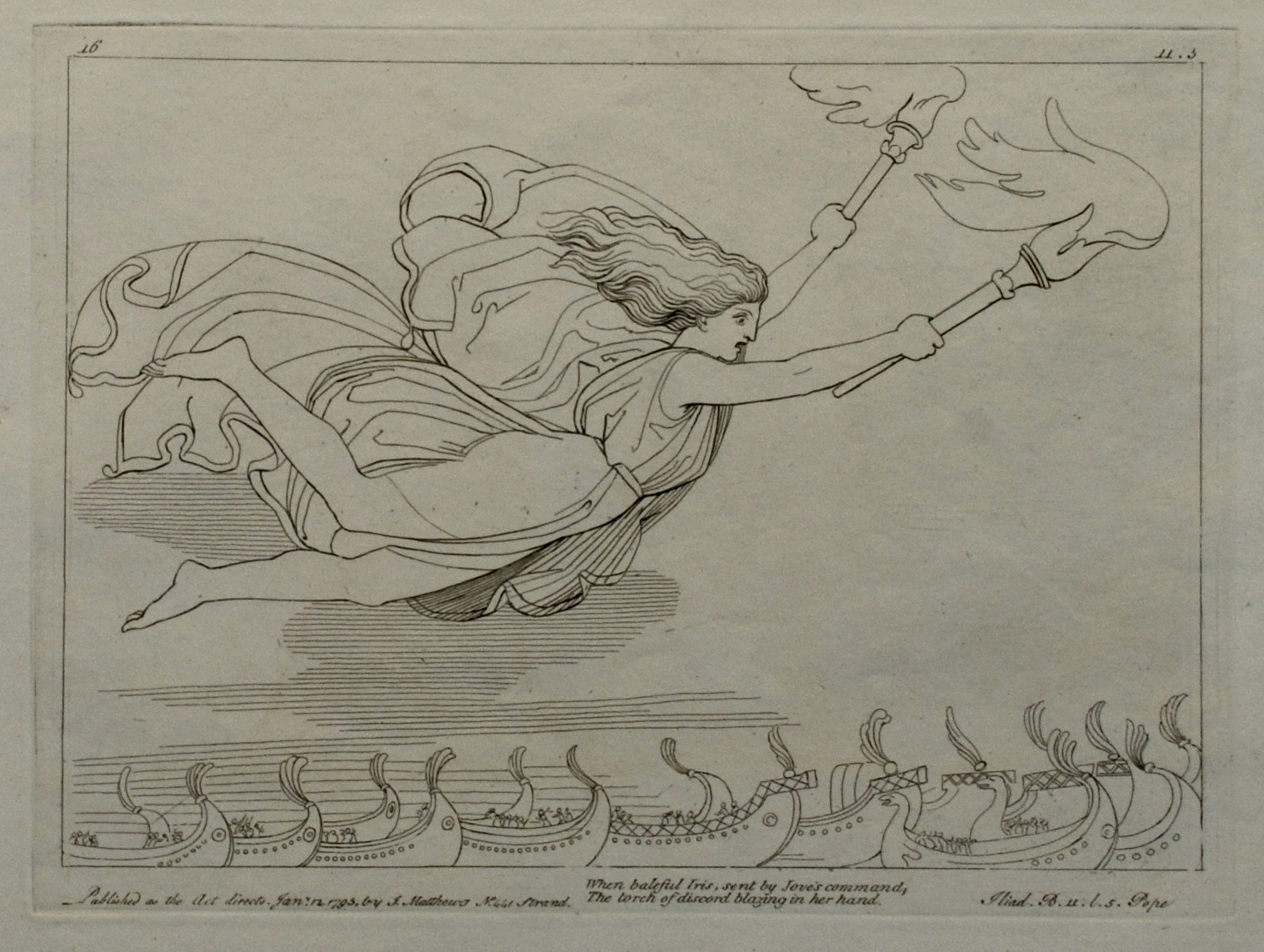
Iris sent by Jove in the Iliad (engraving by Tommaso Piroli after John Flaxman)

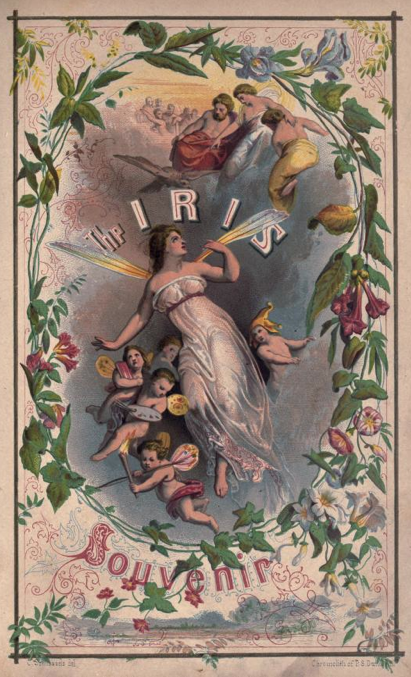
The Iris: an Illuminated Souvenir (1852)

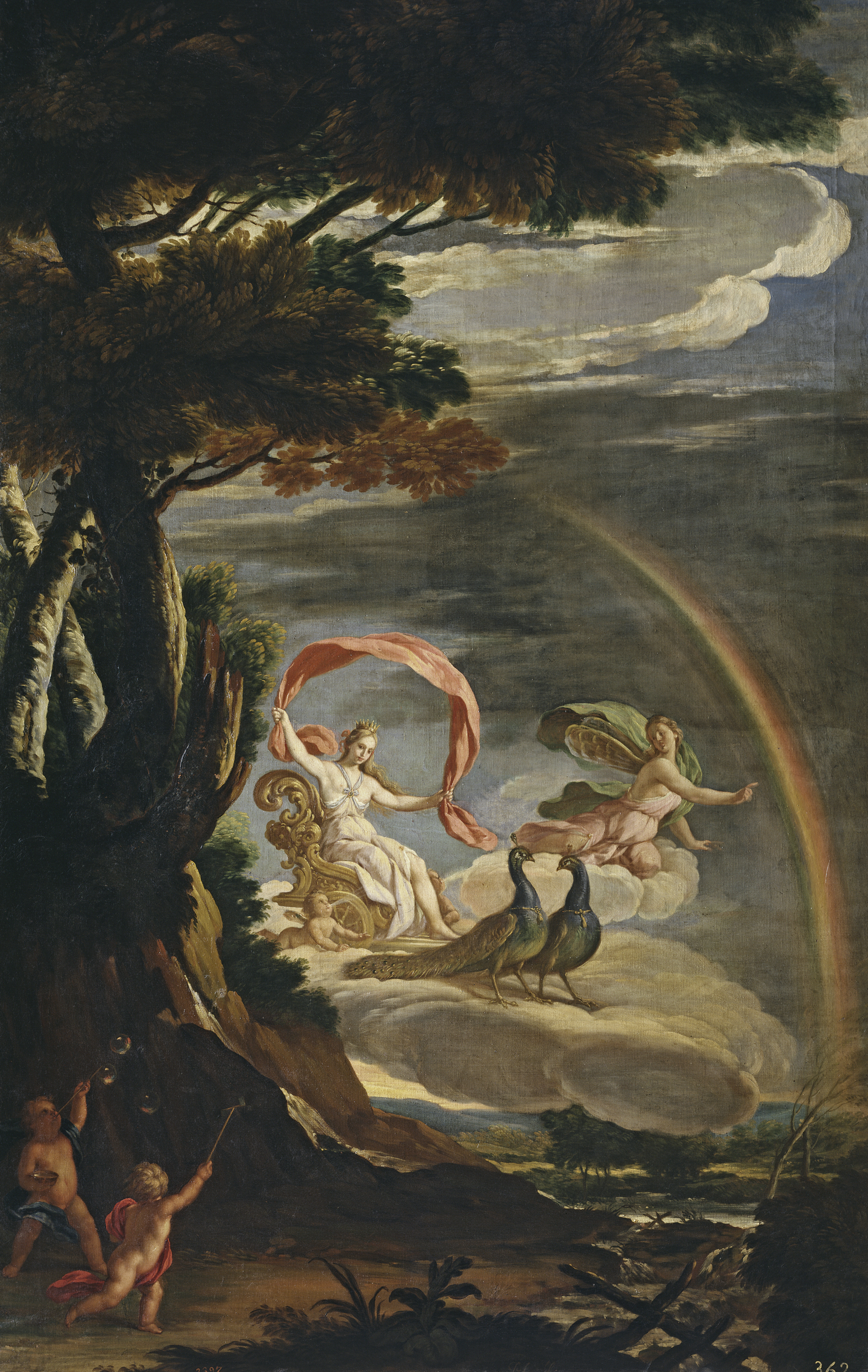
Alegoría del Aire by Antonio Palomino (circa 1700)

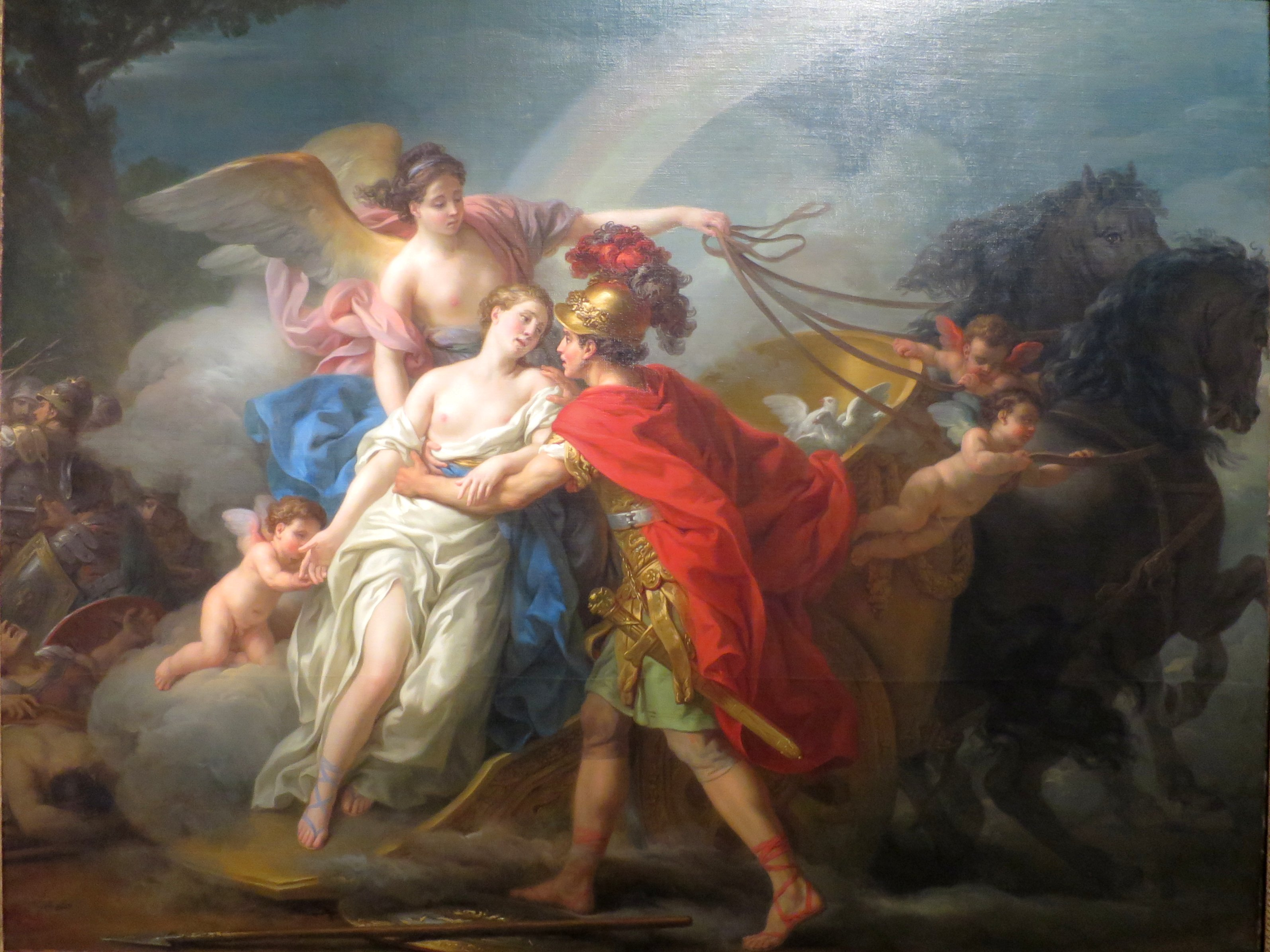
Venus, Wounded by Diomedes, Is Saved by Iris by Joseph-Marie Vien (1775)

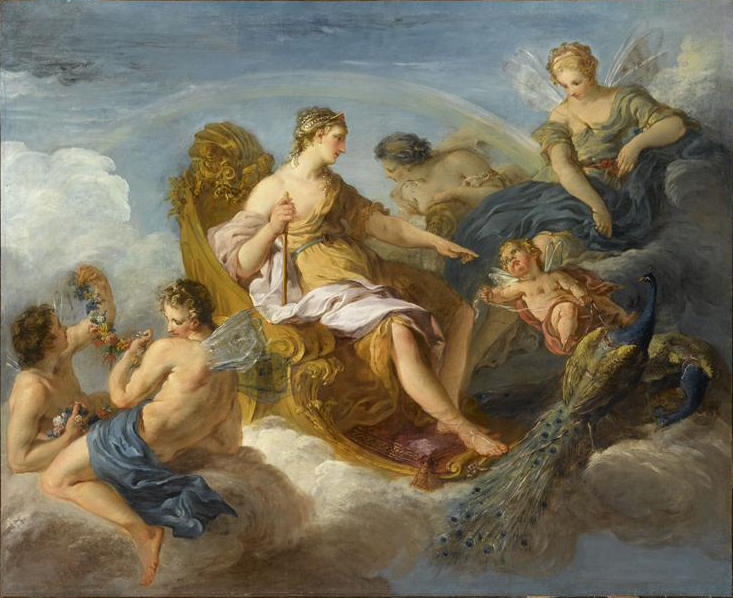
Juno, Iris and Flora by François Lemoyne

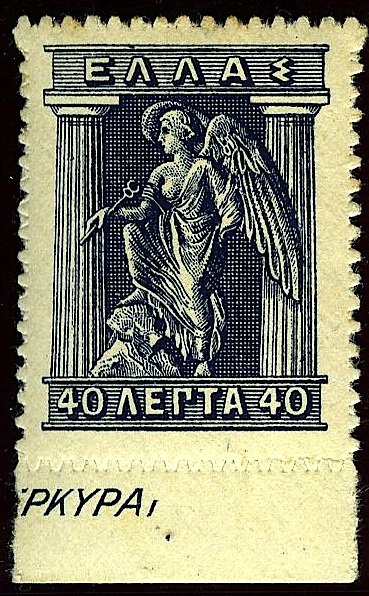
Grèce - Série courante de 1913-24 Type "Iris" - litho - Yvert 198B

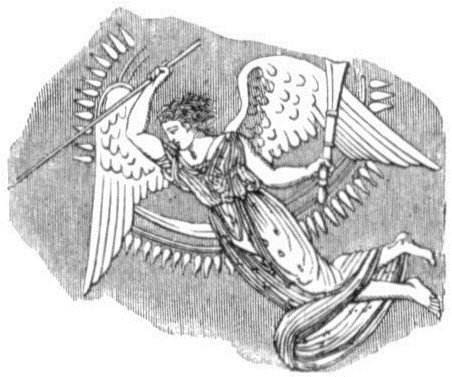
Iris (tiré d'un vase antique). Illustration de "Histoires des météores" (1870)

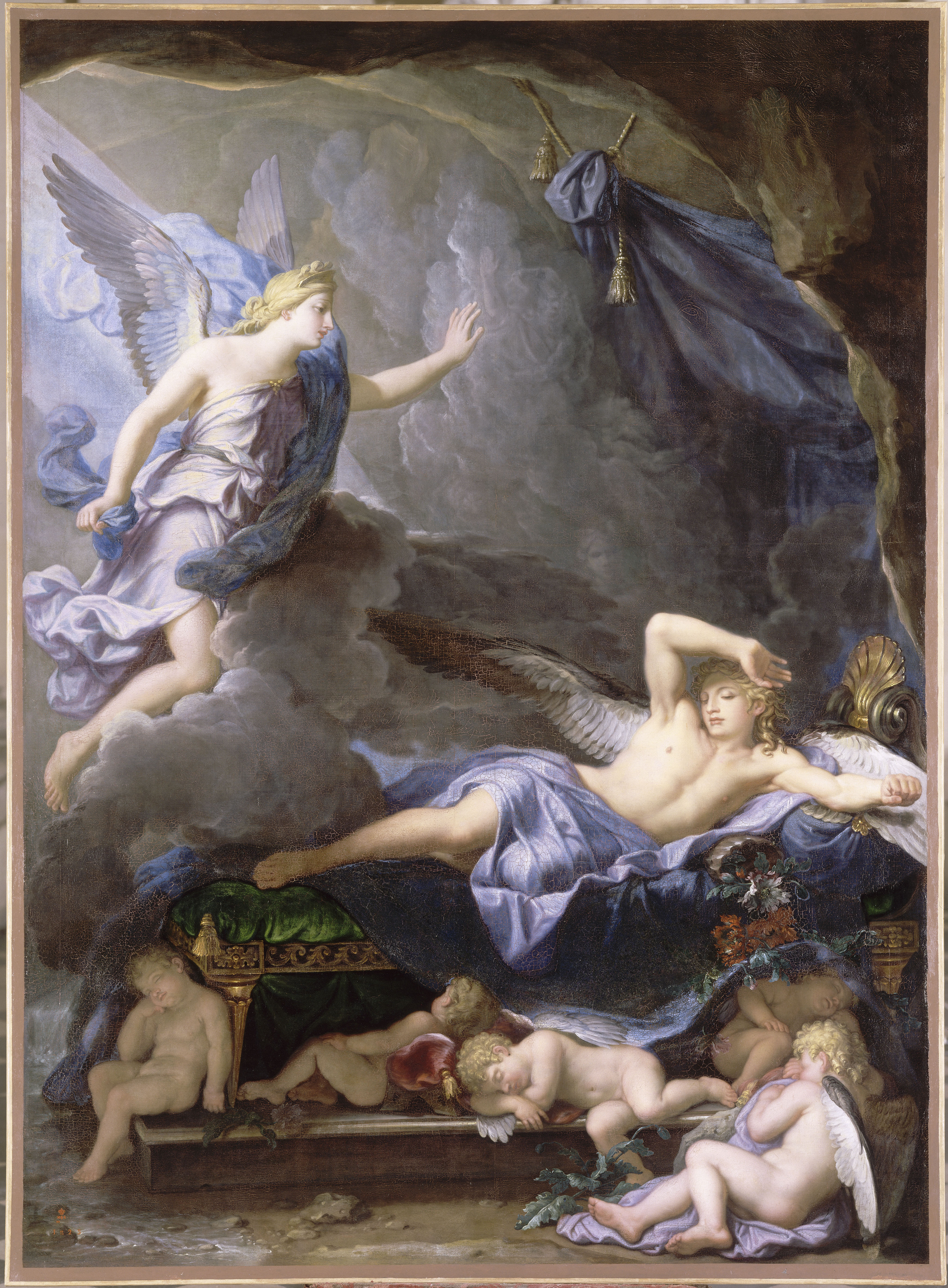
Morpheus awakening as Iris draws near by René-Antoine Houasse (1690)

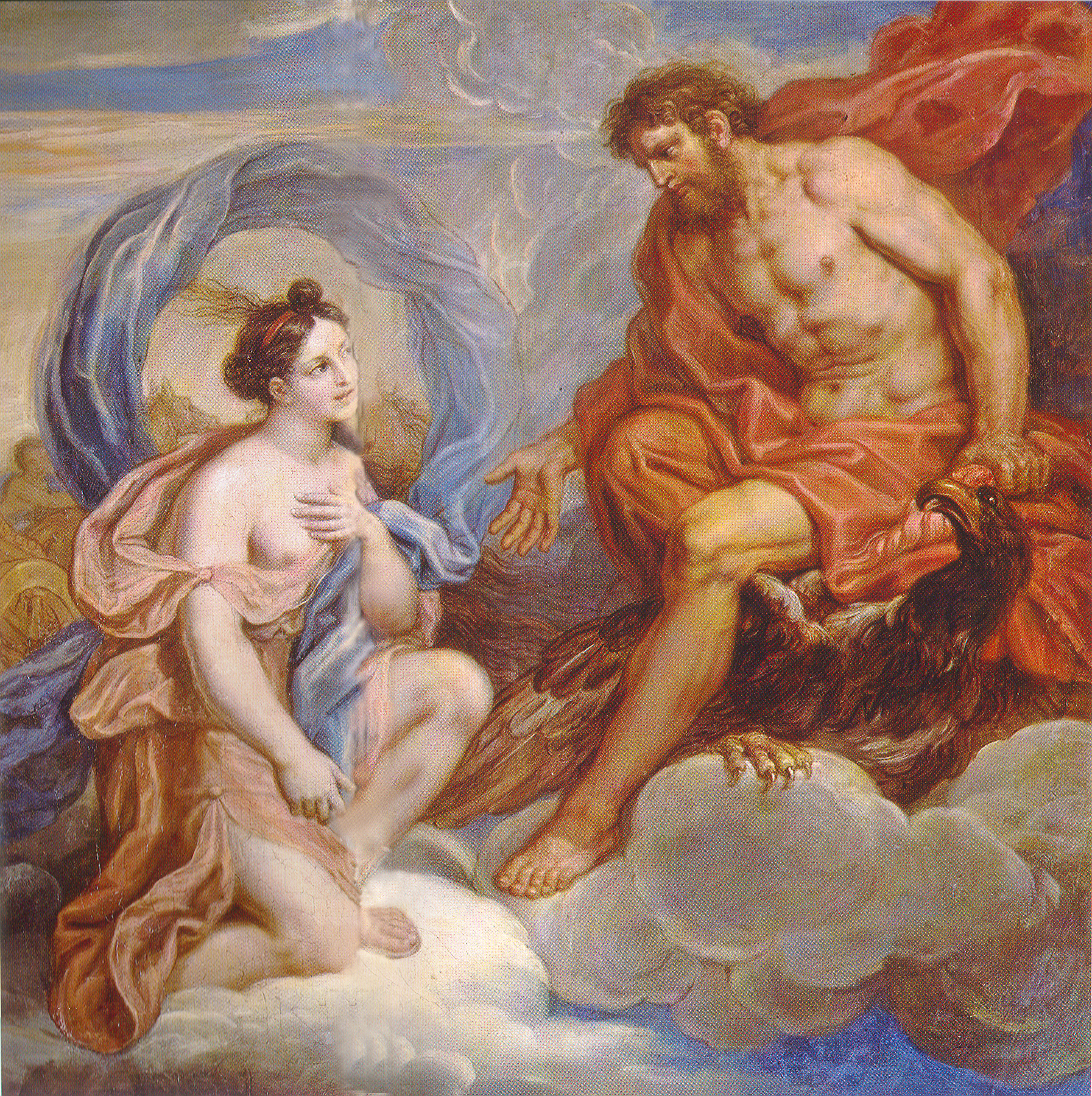
Iris and Jupiter by Michel Corneille the Younger (1701)

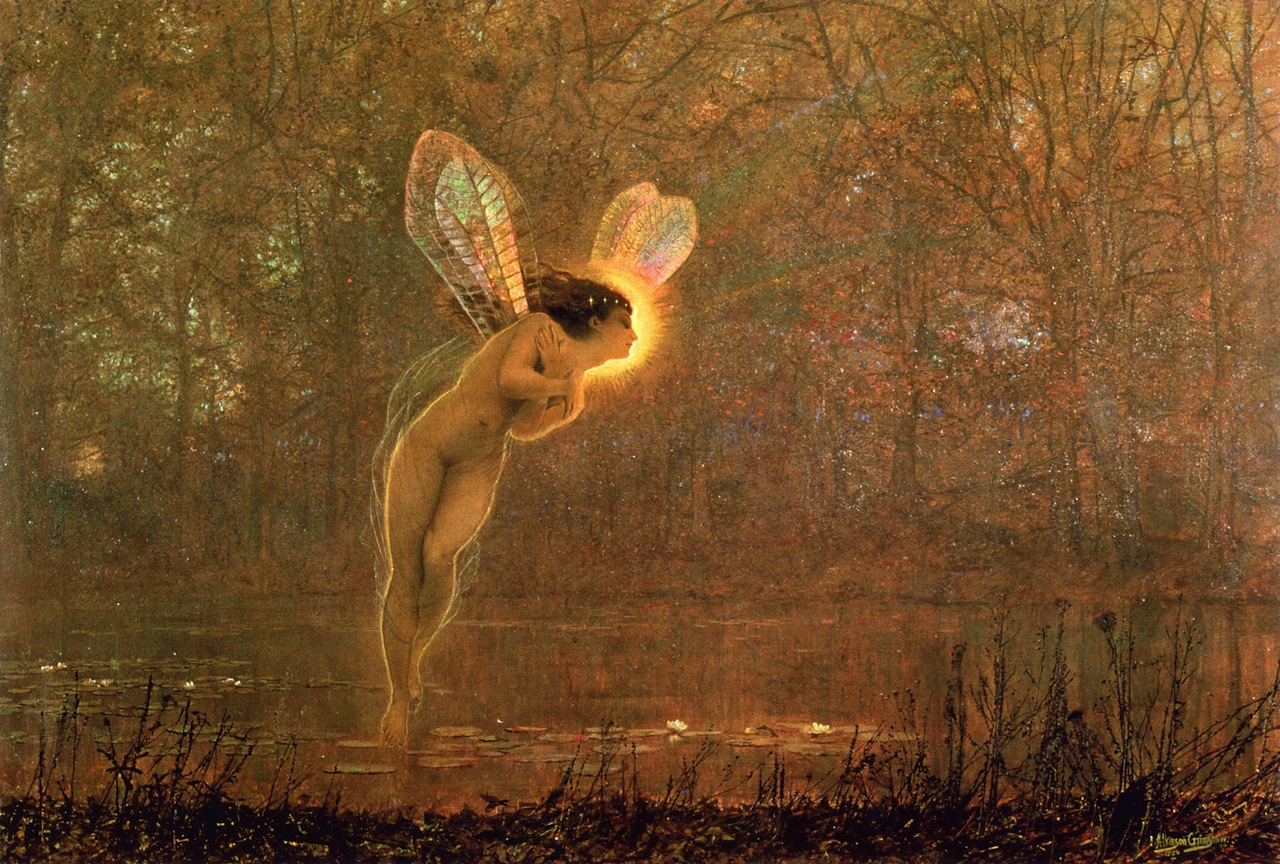
Iris depicted by John Atkinson Grimshaw

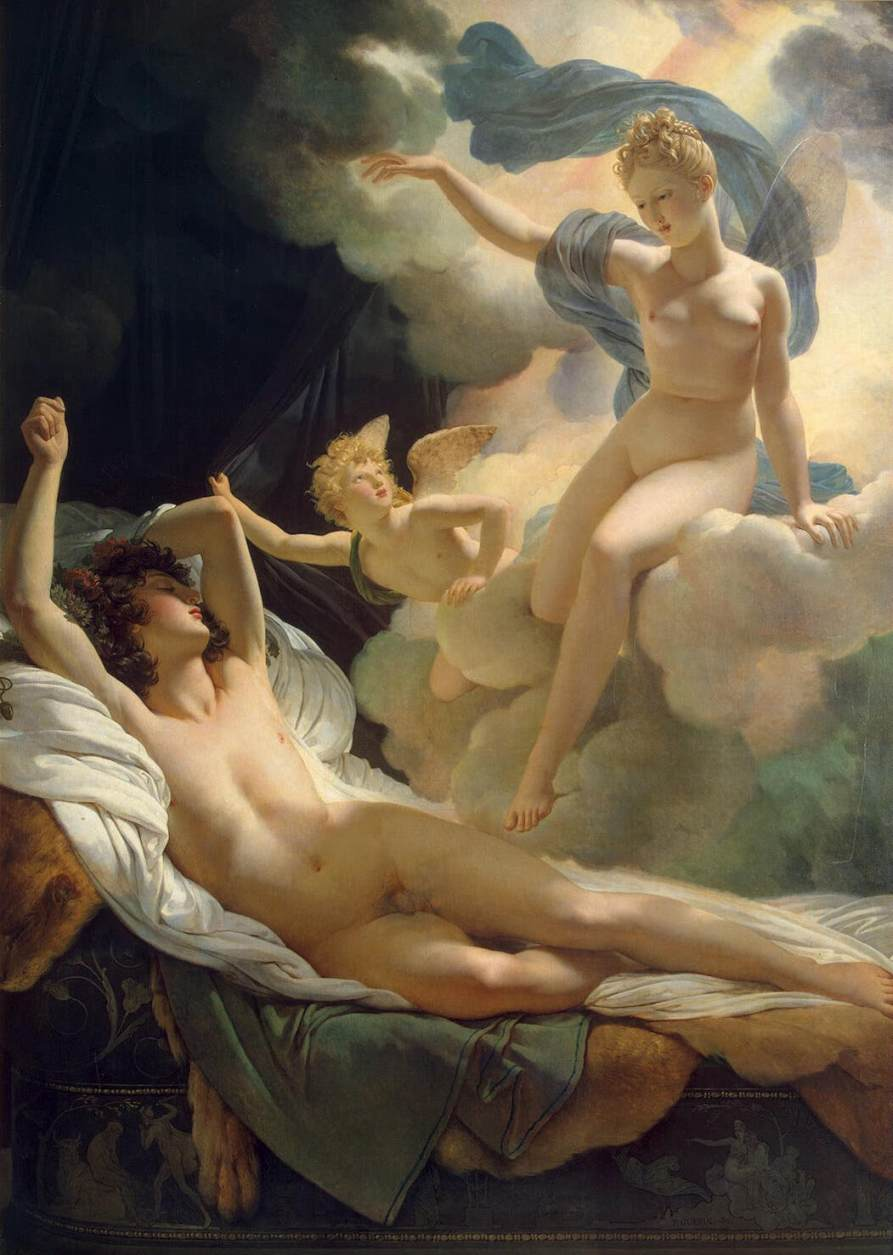
Morpheus and Iris by Pierre-Narcisse Guérin (1811)

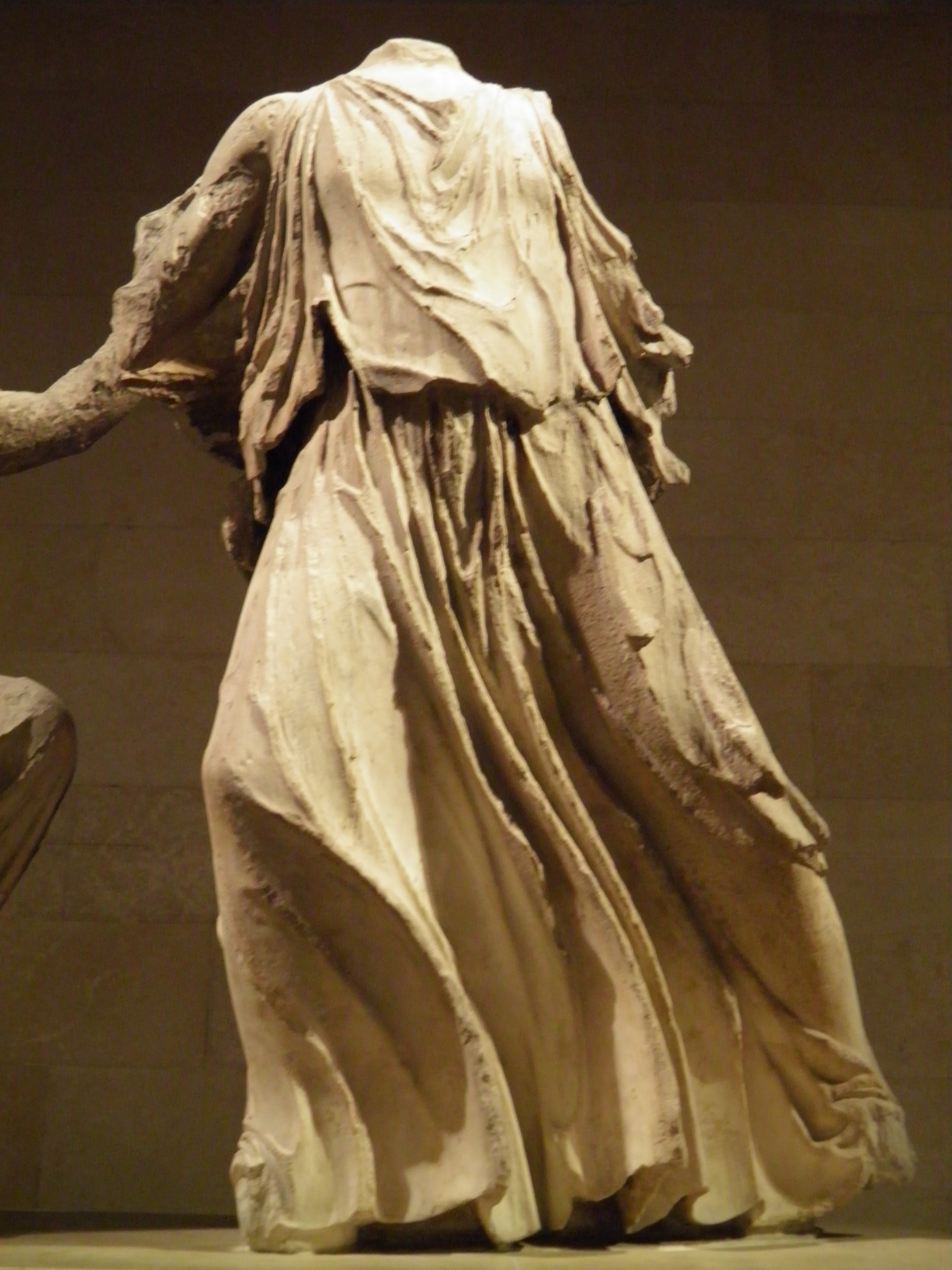
Iris from the East Pediment of the Parthenon

== See also ==
- Rainbow deity
- Angelia, another messenger goddess.
- Angel
- Ithax, the Titans's messenger god.
- Ninshubur

== Bibliography ==
=== Ancient sources ===
- Apollodorus, Apollodorus, The Library, with an English Translation by Sir James George Frazer, F.B.A., F.R.S. in 2 Volumes. Cambridge, MA, Harvard University Press; London, William Heinemann Ltd. 1921. Online version at the Perseus Digital Library.
- Apollonius Rhodius, Argonautica translated by Robert Cooper Seaton (1853–1915), R. C. Loeb Classical Library Volume 001. London, William Heinemann Ltd, 1912. Online version at the Topos Text Project.
- Callimachus. Hymns, translated by Alexander William Mair (1875–1928). London: William Heinemann; New York: G.P. Putnam's Sons. 1921. Online version at the Topos Text Project.
- Hesiod, Theogony, in The Homeric Hymns and Homerica with an English Translation by Hugh G. Evelyn-White, Cambridge, MA., Harvard University Press; London, William Heinemann Ltd. 1914. Online version at the Perseus Digital Library.
- Homer, The Iliad with an English Translation by A.T. Murray, PhD in two volumes. Cambridge, MA., Harvard University Press; London, William Heinemann, Ltd. 1924. Online version at the Perseus Digital Library.
- Evelyn-White, Hugh, The Homeric Hymns and Homerica with an English Translation by Hugh G. Evelyn-White. Homeric Hymns. Cambridge, Massachusetts, Harvard University Press; London, William Heinemann Ltd. 1914.
- Euripides, The Complete Greek Drama', edited by Whitney J. Oates and Eugene O'Neill, Jr. in two volumes. 2. The Phoenissae, translated by E. P. Coleridge. New York. Random House. 1938.
- Ovid. Metamorphoses, Volume I: Books 1–8. Translated by Frank Justus Miller. Revised by G. P. Goold. Loeb Classical Library No. 42. Cambridge, Massachusetts: Harvard University Press, 1977, first published 1916. ISBN 978-0-674-99046-3. Online version at Harvard University Press.
- Statius, Thebaid, Volume II: Thebaid: Books 8–12. Achilleid. Edited and translated by D. R. Shackleton Bailey. Loeb Classical Library 498. Cambridge, MA: Harvard University Press, 2004.
- Theocritus, Idylls and Epigrams with an Epilogue, translation by Daryl Hine, New York, Atheneum, 1982, ISBN 0-689-11320-X.
- Valerius Flaccus, Argonautica. Translated by J. H. Mozley. Loeb Classical Library 286. Cambridge, MA: Harvard University Press, 1934.
- Vergil, Aeneid. Theodore C. Williams. trans. Boston. Houghton Mifflin Co. 1910. Online version at the Perseus Digital Library.

=== Modern sources ===
- Antonopoulos, Andreas P.; Christopoulos, Menelaos M.; Harrison, George W. M. (July 5, 2021). Reconstructing Satyr Drama. De Gruyter. ISBN 9783110725216.
- Beekes, Robert S. P. (2009). Etymological Dictionary of Greek. Leiden: Brill Publications. p. 1:598.
- Grimal, Pierre (1996). "Iris". The Dictionary of Classical Mythology. ISBN 978-0-631-20102-1. pp. 237–238.
- Peyré, Yves (2009). "Iris". A Dictionary of Shakespeare's Classical Mythology, ed. Yves Peyré.
- Sells, Donald (2019). Parody, Politics and the Populace in Greek Old Comedy. Bloomsbury Academic. ISBN 978-1-3500-6051-7.
- Welsh, Alexander (2014). The Humanist Comedy. New Haven, Connecticut: Yale University Press. ISBN 978-0-300-19751-8.
- Smith, William (1873). "Iris". Dictionary of Greek and Roman Biography and Mythology. London.
