= Chrysippus of Jerusalem =

5th-century Christian priest and theologian

Chrysippus of Jerusalem, also known as Chrysippus of Cappadocia, was a Christian priest and ecclesiastical writer who was active during the middle of the 5th century. He is best known as an author of homiletic literature.

== Biography ==
Little is known of the details of Chrysippus' younger years. He was born in Cappadocia around the turn of the 5th century but was raised and educated in Syria with two of his brothers. When Euthymius the Great founded a Lavra in the Judean desert Chrysippus was among the first disciples to join circa 428/9. He was ordained a priest in Jerusalem at the Church of the Anastasis shortly after 456, and came to hold the significant post of "Guardian of the Cross" a decade later. He died in 479.

== Theology and Significance ==
As a priest, Chrysippus continued the Palestinian tradition of homiletic prowess from clergymen like Cyril and Hesychius. Only a few of his works are known to have survived to the present, all of which bear the marks of liturgical intent. His homilies are characterised by rhetorical emphasis of scriptural texts accompanied by exclamations and praises resembling prose hymns more than sermons, typical of Greek piety.

=== Marian Theology ===
Active in the aftermath of the Council of Ephesus, Chrysippus is a witness to the blossoming Marian piety in the early Byzantine period through his colourful Panegyric on Mary that was probably delivered in Jerusalem during celebrations on the 15 August Marian feast. Using as his foundation the exegesis of selected scriptural passages long standardised in the works of preceding theologians like the Cappadocian Fathers, Chrysippus makes use of traditional praises of Mary by identifying her as the Ark of the Covenant and Ever-Virgin. Further to this, he acclaims her as "root of all good things" in language coincident with that of earlier contemporaries Cyril of Alexandria and Proclus of Constantinople. He exceeds previous authors in his use of the repetitious salutation "Hail" (Χαῖρε), a form of invocatory Marian prayer anticipating the flowering of Byzantine Marian hymnography in the Akathist, usually dated to the 6th century. Nevertheless, some scholars have argued for a 5th-century provenance for the Akathist, and together with the evidence that Proclus' Marian praise drew in part from extant hymnography now known to have been in use in Jerusalem prior to Ephesus, the possibility is raised that Chrysippus was adapting existing liturgical material for his audience, which was composed chiefly of monks.

Limberis characterises the oration as "an example of the encomiastic hymn as the ideal conveyance for Mariological veneration" and describes Chrysippus as having a "central role in helping to spread the cult of the Theotokos."

== Works by Chrysippus ==
- Panegyric on the Theotokos
- Panegyric on Michael the Archangel
- Panegyric on John the Baptist
- Miracula Theodori
