= Balius and Xanthus =

Pair of immortal horses in Greek mythology

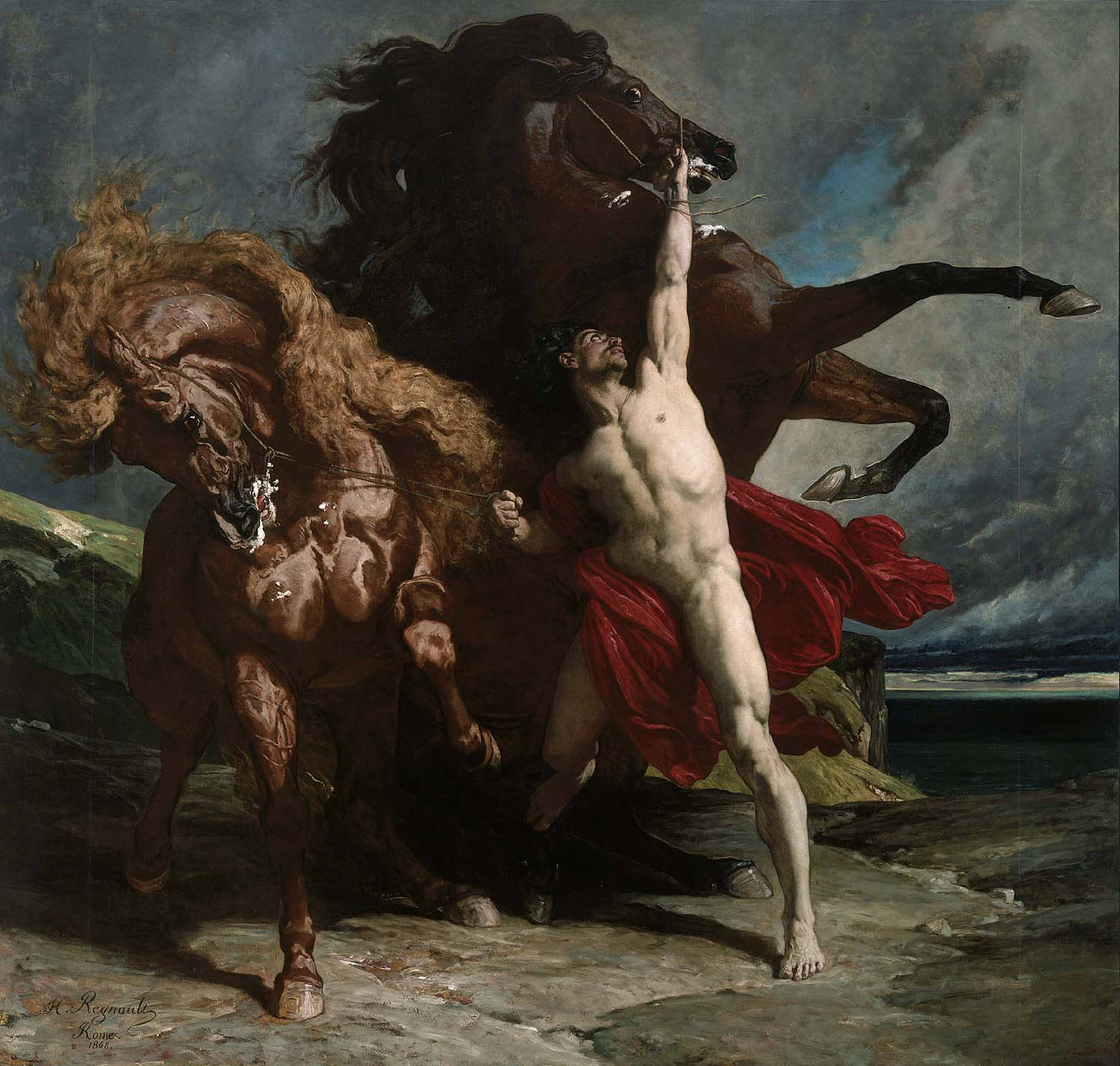
Balius and Xanthus

Balius (/ˈbeɪliəs/; Ancient Greek: Βάλιος, Balios, possibly "dappled") and Xanthus (/ˈzænθəs/; Ancient Greek: Ξάνθος, Xanthos, "blonde") were, according to Greek mythology, two immortal horses, the offspring of the harpy Podarge and the West wind, Zephyrus. In other traditions, Poseidon is the father of Xanthus along with another horse named Cyllarus to an unnamed mother. It is possible that Xanthus's ability to speak prophetically may be related to Arion, another mythical horse reported to have saved Adrastus from the war of the Seven against Thebes with his prophetic abilities in Statius's Thebaid.

== Mythology ==
Poseidon gave the two horses to King Peleus of Phthia, as a wedding gift when Peleus married the Ocean goddess, Thetis. Peleus later gave the horses to his son Achilles who took them to draw his chariot during the Trojan War.

Book 16 of the Iliad tells us that Achilles had a third horse, Pedasos (maybe "Jumper", maybe "Captive"), which was yoked as a trace horse, along with Xanthus and Balios. Achilles had captured Pedasos when he took the city of Eetion. Pedasos was mortal, but he could keep up with the divine horses. Sarpedon, prince of Lycia and ally of Troy, killed Pedasos when his spear missed Patroclus. Achilles' comrade-in-arms Patroclus used to feed and groom these horses. In the Iliad, it was told how, when Patroclus was killed in battle, Xanthus and Balius stood motionless on the field of battle and wept.

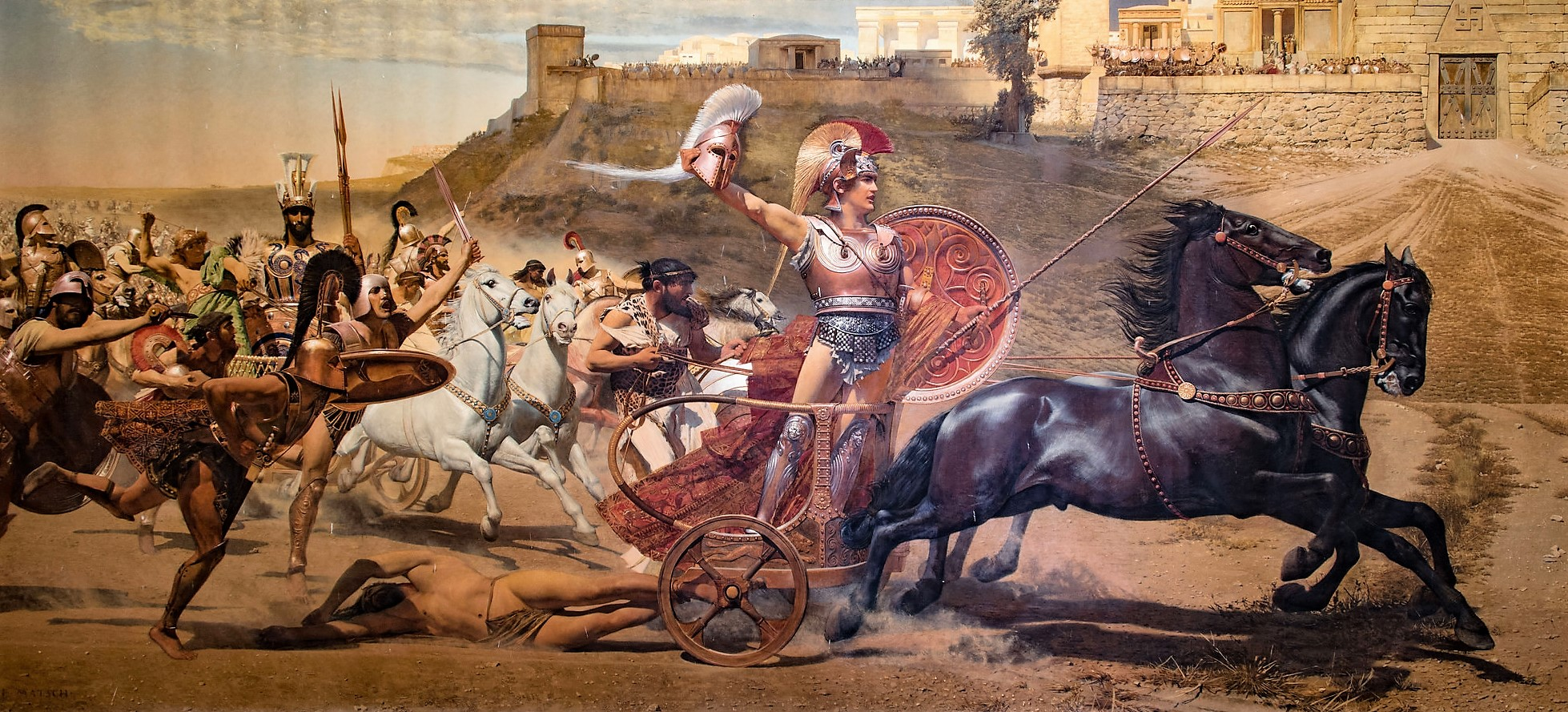
Late 19th-century fresco by Franz von Matsch (1861–1952) in the Aquileon: the chariot of Achilles drags the body of Hector.

In lines 17.474–17.478 of the Iliad, Automedon, Achilles' charioteer, implies that only Patroclus, now dead, was able to control these horses. In lines 17.474–17.486, the Myrmidon chief Alcimedon appears and takes the reins at Automedon's request. In lines 19.400–19.418, when the horses were rebuked by the grieving Achilles for allowing Patroclus to lie fallen on the battlefield, instead of bringing him back to the Greeks, Hera granted Xanthus human speech, allowing the horse to say that a god, Apollo, had killed Patroclus, and that a god and a mortal would soon kill Achilles too. After this, the Erinyes struck the horse dumb.

Based on fragments from Alcman and Stesichorus, an alternative story of the horses can be derived. The horses, named Xanthus and Cyllarus, are the sons of Poseidon, who gave them to Hera as a gift. The latter bestowed them onto the Dioscuri to use as their horses in battle, and Xanthus retains his ability to speak with Castor.

== See also ==
- List of fictional horses
