= Thaumas =

Sea god of Greek mythology

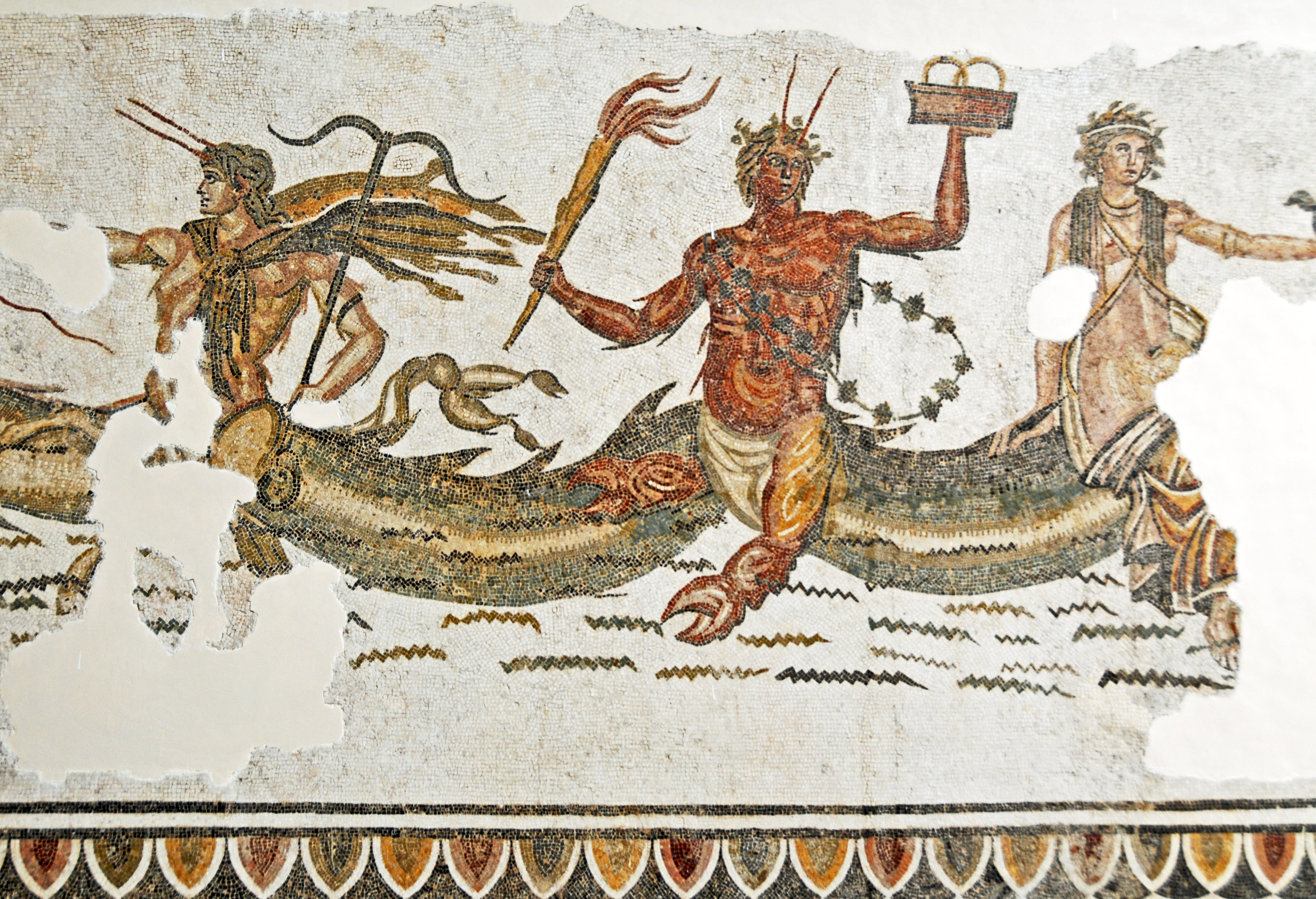
- Thaumas or Triton (left) next to Phorcys and Ceto on a late Roman mosaic. Bardo National Museum, Tunis

Genealogy
- Parents: Pontus and Gaia
- Siblings: Nereus, Phorcys, Ceto, and Eurybia
- Consort: Electra
- Children: Iris, Arke, Harpies

In Greek mythology, Thaumas or Thaumant (/ˈθɔːməs/; Ancient Greek: Θαύμας; gen.: Θαύμαντος) was a sea god, son of Pontus and Gaia, and the full brother of Nereus, Phorcys, Ceto and Eurybia.

== Etymology ==
Plato associates Thaumas's name with θαῦμα ("wonder").

== Mythology ==
According to Hesiod, Thaumas's wife was Electra (one of the Oceanids, the many daughters of the Titans Oceanus and Tethys), by whom he fathered Iris (the messenger of the gods), Arke (formerly the messenger of the Titans), and the Harpies.

The names of Thaumas's Harpy daughters vary. Hesiod and Apollodorus name them: Aello and Ocypete. Virgil, names Celaeno as one of the Harpies. However, while Hyginus, Fabulae Preface has the Harpies, Celaeno, Ocypete, and Podarce, as daughters of Thaumas and Electra, at Fabulae 14.18, the Harpies are said to be named Aellopous, Celaeno, and Ocypete, and are the daughters of Thaumas and Ozomene.

The 5th-century poet Nonnus gives Thaumas and Electra two children, Iris, and the river Hydaspes.

Thaumas was also the name of a centaur, who fought against the Lapiths at the Centauromachy.
