= Harpy =

Half-bird half-woman monsters associated with storm winds

- A harpy in the heraldic style, John Vinycomb, 1906.

Creature information
- Grouping: Legendary creature
- Sub grouping: Hybrid
- Similar entities: Siren

Origin
- Country: Greek and Roman

In Greek and Roman mythology, a harpy (plural harpies, Ancient Greek: ἅρπυια, romanized: hárpyia, pronounced [hárpyːa]; Latin: harpȳia) is a half-human and half-bird mythical creature, often believed to be a personification of storm winds. They feature in Homeric poems.

== Descriptions ==
Harpies were generally depicted as birds with the heads of maidens, faces pale with hunger and long claws on their legs. Roman and Byzantine writers detailed their ugliness. Pottery art depicting the harpies featured beautiful women with wings. Ovid described them as human-vultures.

=== Hesiod ===
To Hesiod, they were imagined as fair-locked and winged maidens, who flew as fast as the wind:

[T]he Harpyiai (Harpies) of the lovely hair, Okypete (Ocypete) and Aello, and these two in the speed of their wings keep pace with the blowing winds, or birds in flight, as they soar and swoop, high aloft.

=== Aeschylus ===
Even as early as the time of Aeschylus, harpies were thought to be ugly creatures with wings, and later writers carried their notions of the harpies so far as to represent them as most disgusting monsters. The Pythian priestess of Apollo compares the appearance of the Erinyes, chthonic goddesses of vengeance, with those of harpies in the following lines of The Eumenides:

Before this man an extraordinary band of women [i.e. the Erinyes] slept, seated on thrones. No! Not women, but rather Gorgons I call them; and yet I cannot compare them to forms of Gorgons either. Once before I saw some creatures in a painting [i.e. harpies], carrying off the feast of Phineus; but these [i.e. the Erinyes] are wingless in appearance, black, altogether disgusting; they snore with repulsive breaths, they drip from their eyes hateful drops; their attire is not fit to bring either before the statues of the gods or into the homes of men.

=== Virgil ===
Bird-bodied, girl-faced things they (Harpies) are; abominable their droppings, their hands are talons, their faces haggard with hunger insatiable.

=== Hyginus ===
They are said to have been feathered, with cocks' heads, wings, and human arms, with great claws; breasts, bellies, and female parts human.

== Functions and abodes ==
The harpies seem originally to have been wind spirits (personifications of the destructive nature of wind). Their name means 'snatchers' or 'swift robbers', and they were said to steal food from their victims while they were eating and carry evildoers (especially those who have killed their families) to the Erinyes. When a person suddenly disappeared from the Earth, it was said that he had been carried off by the harpies. Thus, they carried off the daughters of King Pandareus and gave them as servants to the Erinyes. In this form they were agents of punishment who abducted people and tortured them on their way to Tartarus. They were depicted as vicious, cruel, and violent.

The harpies were called "the hounds of mighty Zeus" thus "ministers of the Thunderer (Zeus)". Later writers listed the harpies among the guardians of the underworld among other monstrosities including the Centaurs, Scylla, Briareus, Lernaean Hydra, Chimera, Gorgons and Geryon.

Their abode was described as either the islands called Strofades, a place at the entrance of Orcus, or a cave in Crete.

== Names and family ==
Hesiod calls them two "lovely-haired" creatures, the daughters of Thaumas and the Oceanid Electra and sisters of Iris. Hyginus, however, cited a certain Ozomene as the mother of the harpies but he also recounted that Electra was also the mother of these beings in the same source. This can be explained by the fact that Ozomene was another name for Electra. The harpies possibly were siblings of the river-god Hydaspes and Arke, as they were called sisters of Iris and children of Thaumas. According to Valerius, Typhoeus (Typhon) was said to be the father of these monsters while a different version by Servius told that the harpies were daughters of Pontus and Gaea or of Poseidon.

They were named Aello ("storm swift") and Ocypete ("the swift wing"), and Virgil added Celaeno ("the dark") as a third. Homer knew of a harpy named Podarge ("fleet-foot"). Aello is sometimes also spelled Aellopus or Nicothoe; Ocypete is sometimes also spelled Ocythoe or Ocypode.

Homer called the harpy Podarge as the mother of the two horses (Balius and Xanthus) of Achilles sired by the West Wind Zephyrus while according to Nonnus, Xanthus and Podarkes, horses of the Athenian king Erechtheus, were born to Aello and the North Wind Boreas. Other progeny of Podarge were Phlogeus and Harpagos, horses given by Hermes to the Dioscuri, who competed for the chariot-race in celebration of the funeral games of Pelias. The swift horse Arion was also said to begotten by loud-piping Zephyrus on a harpy (probably Podarge), as attested by Quintus Smyrnaeus.

Names and family of harpies according to various sources
Name and relation	Hesiod	Homer	Stesichorus	Virgil	Valerius	Apollodorus	Hyginus	Nonnus	Quintus	Servius
Parents	Thaumas and Electra	not stated	not stated	not stated	Typhoeus	Thaumas and Electra	Thaumas and Electra or Ozomene	not stated	not stated	Pontus and Gaea or Poseidon
Names	Aello	Podarge	Podarge		not stated	Aello or Nicothoe	Aellopus or Podarce	Aellopos	Podarge	not stated
Names	Ocypete				not stated	Ocypete, Ocythoe or Ocypode	Ocypete	–		not stated
Names				Celaeno	not stated		Celaeno			not stated
Mate	–	Zephyrus	not stated	–	–	–	–	Boreas	Zephyrus	–
Progeny	–	Balius and Xanthus	Phlogeus and Harpagos	–	–	–	–	Xanthus and Podarkes	Balius and Xanthus; Arion	–

== Mythology ==
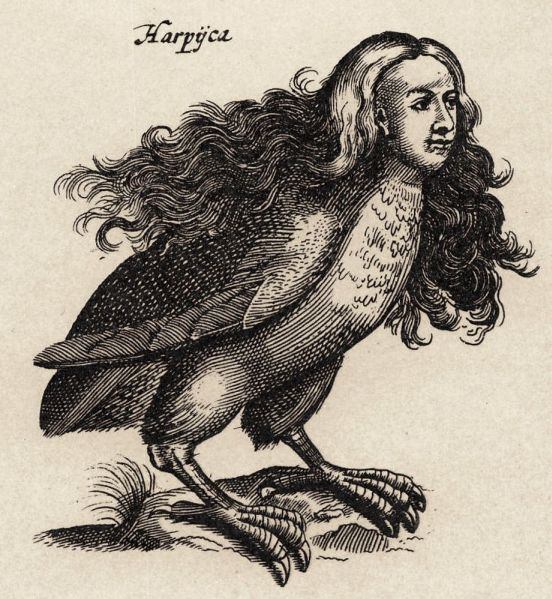
A harpy in Ulisse Aldrovandi's Monstrorum Historia, Bologna, 1642.

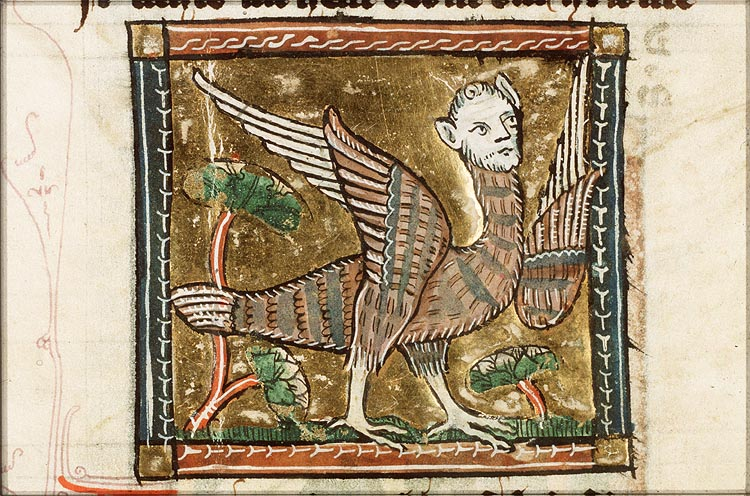
A medieval depiction of a harpy as a bird-man.

The most celebrated story in which the harpies play a part is that of King Phineus of Thrace, who was given the gift of prophecy by Zeus. Angry that Phineus gave away the god's secret plan, Zeus punished him by blinding him and putting him on an island with a buffet of food which he could never eat because the harpies always arrived to steal the food out of his hands before he could satisfy his hunger. Later writers add that they either devoured the food themselves, or that they dirtied it by dropping upon it some stinking substance, so as to render it unfit to be eaten.

This continued until the arrival of Jason and the Argonauts. Phineus promised to instruct them respecting the course they had to take, if they would deliver him from the harpies. The Boreads, sons of Boreas, the North Wind, who also could fly, succeeded in driving off the harpies. According to an ancient story, the harpies were to die by the hands of the Boreades, but the Boreades were to die if they could not overtake the harpies. The harpies fled, but one fell into the river Tigris, which was hence called Harpys, and the other reached the Echinades, and as she never returned, the islands were called Strophades. But being worn out with fatigue, she fell down simultaneously with her pursuer; and, as they promised no further to molest Phineus, the two harpies were not deprived of their lives. According to others, the Boreades were on the point of killing the harpies, when Iris or Hermes appeared and commanded the conquerors to set them free, promising that Phineus would not be bothered by the harpies again. "The dogs of great Zeus" then returned to their "cave in Minoan Crete". Other accounts said that both the harpies as well as the Boreades died. Thankful for their help, Phineus told the Argonauts how to pass the Symplegades.

Tzetzes explained the origin of the myth pertaining to Phineus, the harpies, and the Boreades in his account. In this late version of the myth it was said that Phineus, due to his old age, became blind, and he has two daughters named Eraseia and Harpyreia. These maidens lived a very libertine and lazy life, abandoning themselves to poverty and fatal famine. Then Zetes and Calais snatched them away somehow, and they disappeared from those places ever since. From this account all myths about them [i.e., the harpies] started, as was also retold by Apollonius in his own story of the Argonauts.

=== Aeneid ===
Aeneas encountered harpies on the Strophades as they repeatedly made off with the feast the Trojans were setting. Celaeno utters a prophecy: the Trojans will be so hungry they will eat their tables before they reach the end of their journey. The Trojans fled in fear.

== Later usage ==
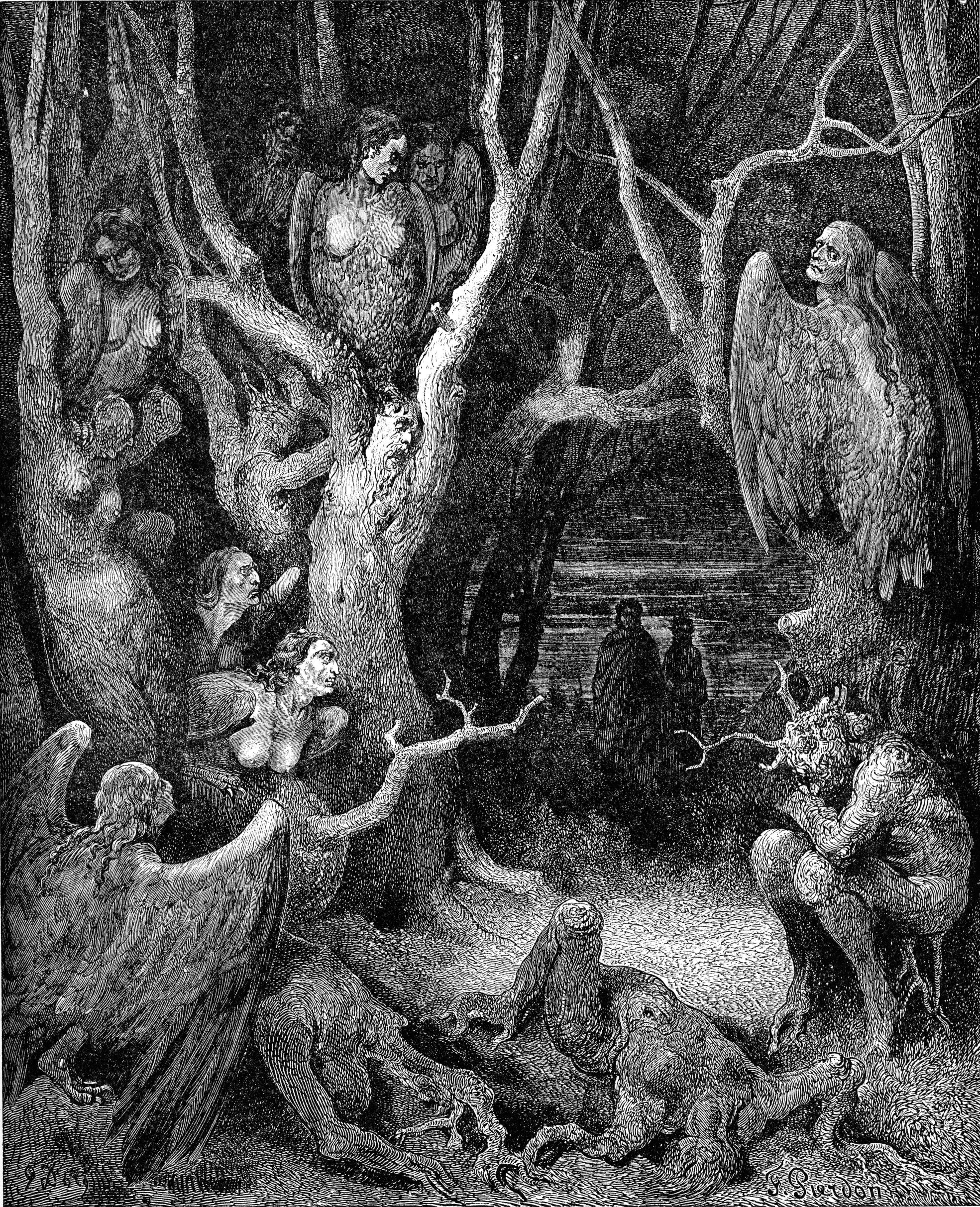
Harpies in the infernal wood, from Inferno XIII, by Gustave Doré, 1861.

=== Literature ===
Harpies remained vivid in the Middle Ages. In Canto XIII of his Inferno, Dante Alighieri envisages the tortured wood infested with harpies, where the suicides have their punishment in the seventh ring of Hell:

Here the repellent harpies make their nests,
Who drove the Trojans from the Strophades
With dire announcements of the coming woe.
They have broad wings, with razor sharp talons and a human neck and face,
Clawed feet and swollen, feathered bellies; they caw
Their lamentations in the eerie trees.

In Canto XXXIII of Orlando Furioso, author Ludovico Ariosto has the Christian Ethiopian Emperor Senapo (Prester John) afflicted with harpies under circumstances nearly identical to those in the myth of Phineus. He has been blinded by God himself, and the harpies contaminate his every meal. Senapo is delivered from this torment by Astolfo, a paladin from the court of Charlemagne.

William Blake was inspired by Dante's description in his pencil, ink, and watercolour The Wood of the Self-Murderers: The Harpies and the Suicides (Tate Gallery, London).

Harpies also found a role in Shakespeare's Tempest, where the spirit Ariel tortured the antagonists Antonio, Sebastian, and Alonso for their crimes by staging a banquet scene similar to that in the Aeneid.

Greater coat of arms of the city of Nuremberg

=== Linguistic use and application ===
The harpy eagle is a real bird named after the mythological animal.

The term is often used metaphorically to refer to a nasty or annoying woman. In Shakespeare's Much Ado About Nothing, Benedick spots the sharp-tongued Beatrice approaching and exclaims to the prince, Don Pedro, that he would do an assortment of arduous tasks for him "rather than hold three words conference with this harpy!"

=== Heraldry ===
In the Middle Ages, the harpy, referred to in German as the Jungfrauenadler or "maiden eagle" (although it may not have been modeled after the original harpy of Greek mythology), became a popular charge in heraldry, particularly in East Frisia, seen on, among others, the coats-of-arms of Rietberg, Liechtenstein, and the Cirksena. Among the earliest examples is the city of Nuremberg's device, which used the harpy as early as 1243.

The harpy also appears in British heraldry, although it remains a peculiarly German device.

== See also ==
- Alkonost
- Harpya: 1979 Belgian movie about man living with a harpy
- Karura
- Kinnara
- List of avian humanoids
- Seraphim
- Siren (mythology)
- Sirin
- Tengu
- Tulevieja
- Uchek Langmeitong
