= Hydaspes (mythology) =

River god in Greek mythology

In Greek mythology, Hydaspes (Ancient Greek: Ὑδάσπης, romanized: Hydaspēs), was a river god of Pentapotamia with an extraordinary swift stream that flows into the Saronitic Syrtis. It is the modern day Jhelum River ("Vitasta" in Sanskrit).

== Family ==
Hydaspes was a Titan-descended god, the son of the sea-god Thaumas and the cloud-goddess Elektra, an Oceanid. He was the brother of Iris, the messenger goddess of the rainbow. By default, Hydaspes’ possible siblings were Arke and the Harpies.

"He [i.e. Hydaspes] had the genuine Titan blood; for from the bed of primeval Thaumas his rosyarm consort Electra brought forth two children — from that bed came a river and a messenger of the heavenly ones, Iris quick as the wind and swiftly flowing Hydaspes, Iris travelling on foot and Hydaspes by water. Both had an equal speed on two contrasted paths: Iris among the immortals and Hydaspes among the rivers."

By the Heliad Astris, the daughter of Helios and the Oceanid Ceto, Hydaspes fathered Deriades the king of Pentapotamia (Punjab).

"The whole army was led to battle by the emperor of the Deriades, son of Hydaspes the watery lover in union with Astris daughter of Helios, happy in her offspring — men say that her mother was Ceto, a Naiad daughter of Oceanos — and Hydaspes crept into her bower till he flooded it, and wooed her to his embrace with conjugal waves."

According to Plutarch, Hydaspes was the father of Chrysippe, who fell in love with her own father.

== Mythology ==
=== Nonnus' account ===
The poet Nonnus in his Dionysiaca mentioned Hydaspes supported the natives in their war against the invading armies of the god Dionysos.

The whole army was led to battle by the emperor Deriades, son of Hydaspes the watery lover in union with Astris daughter of Helios, happy in her offspring—men say that her mother was Ceto, a Naiad daughter of Oceanos—and Hydaspes crept into her bower till he flooded it, and wooed her to his embrace with conjugal waves. He had the genuine Titan blood; for from the bed of primeval Thaumas his rosy arm consort Electra brought forth two children—from that bed came a river and a messenger of the heavenly ones, Iris quick as the wind and swiftly flowing Hydaspes, Iris travelling on foot and Hydaspes by water. Both had an equal speed on two contrasted paths: Iris among the immortals and Hydaspes among the rivers.

=== Plutarch's account ===
In another myth, the goddess Aphrodite was offended by Chrysippe and consequently made the princess fall in love with her own father. The girl was unable to curb her preternatural desires and, with the help of her nurse, went in the dead of the night to the king's bed and lay with him. When Hydaspes realized what had happened, he ordered the nurse buried alive for her betrayal and his daughter crucified. Soon after, overcome with grief for the loss of Chrysippe, he threw himself into the river Indus (evidently not the modern day Pakistani river of the same name), which was said to have been renamed Hydaspes after him.

== The river ==
Plutarch describes the river in the following excerpts:

Moreover in this river there grows a stone, which is called lychnis, which resembles the color of oil, and is very bright in appearance. And when they are searching after it, which they do when the moon increases, the pipers play all the while. Nor is it to be worn by any but the richer sort. Also near that part of the river which is called Pylae, there grows an herb which is very like a heliotrope, with the juice of which the people anoint their skins to prevent sunburning, and to secure them against the scorching of the excessive heat. The natives whenever they take their virgins tardy, nail them to a wooden cross, and fling them into this river, singing at the same time in their own language a hymn to Venus [i.e Aphrodite]. Every year also they bury a condemned old woman near the top of the hill called Therogonos; at which time an infinite multitude of creeping creatures come down from the top of the hill, and devour the insects that hover about the buried carcass...
