= Electra (Oceanid) =

One of the Oceanids; daughter of Oceanus and Tethys

Genealogy
- Parents: Oceanus and Tethys
- Siblings: Oceanids, river gods
- Consort: Thaumas
- Children: Iris, the Harpies

In Greek mythology, Electra (/ɪˈlɛktrə/; Ancient Greek: Ἠλέκτρα, romanized: Ēléktra) was one of the 3,000 Oceanids, water-nymph daughters of the Titans Oceanus and his sister-spouse Tethys.

== Family ==
According to Hesiod, she was the wife of Thaumas, and by him, the mother of Iris, the goddess of rainbows and a messenger for the gods, and the Harpies.

The names of Electra's Harpy daughters vary. Hesiod and Apollodorus named them Aello and Ocypete. Virgil named Celaeno as one of the Harpies. The Fabulae describes the Harpies – whom it lists as Celaeno, Ocypete, and Podarce – as daughters of Thaumas and Electra. Later, however, the Harpies are named Aellopous, Celaeno, and Ocypete, and are said to be the daughters of Thaumas and Ozomene. Ozomene, whose name means 'the Foul-smelling One', is not known elsewhere.

The late 4th-early 5th century poet Nonnus gives Electra and Thaumas two children: Iris, and the river god Hydaspes.

== Mythology ==
Along with her sisters, Electra was one of the companions of Persephone when the daughter of Demeter was abducted by Hades.
