= Podarge =

Harpy in Greek mythology

In Greek mythology, Podarge (Ancient Greek: Ποδάργη, lit. 'swift-foot') is a harpy, a personification of a swift wind and mate of Zephyrus, the West Wind. She is the mother of Balius and Xanthus — two divine horses renowned for their swiftness and who were gifted to Achilles, running as fast as the wind. In the Iliad, she is described by Homer as having taken horse form, and 'grazing in a meadow by the stream of Ocean'.

Some classical authors also regard her as Zephyrus' wife. However, as the rainbow goddess Iris is his other wife and sister of Podarge, there is confusion between the two.

Stesichorus says the divine horses Phlogeus and Harpagos are the offspring of Podarge.

Her other names are Podarkes, Podarke-Aellopos and Podarces.

== Sources ==
- Homer. Iliad xvi, 148.
- Hyginus. Fabulae Preface, Fabulae 14.
- Quintus Smyrnaeus. Fall of Troy 3 743.
- Stesichorus. Funeral Games of Pelias Fragment 178.
- Nonnus. Dionysiaca 37 155.
