= Podarce (mythology) =

In Greek mythology, Podarce or Podarke (Ancient Greek: Ποδάρκη or Ποδάρκης, romanized: Podarkê, lit. 'swift-footed', 'fleet-footed' or 'succouring with the feet') may refer to the following characters:

- Podarce, a variant of Podarge, one of the Harpies.
- Podarce, one of the 50 Danaïdes as a daughter of King Danaus of Libya (and later Argos) and Pieria. On the orders of her father, she married and murdered her cousin–husband Oeneus, namesake of his father King Aegyptus of Egypt and Gorgo.
