= List of hybrid creatures in folklore =

The following is a list of hybrid entities from the folklore record grouped morphologically. Hybrids not found in classical mythology but developed in the context of modern popular culture are listed in § Modern fiction.

== Mythology ==
=== Head of one animal, body of another ===
==== Mammalian bipeds ====
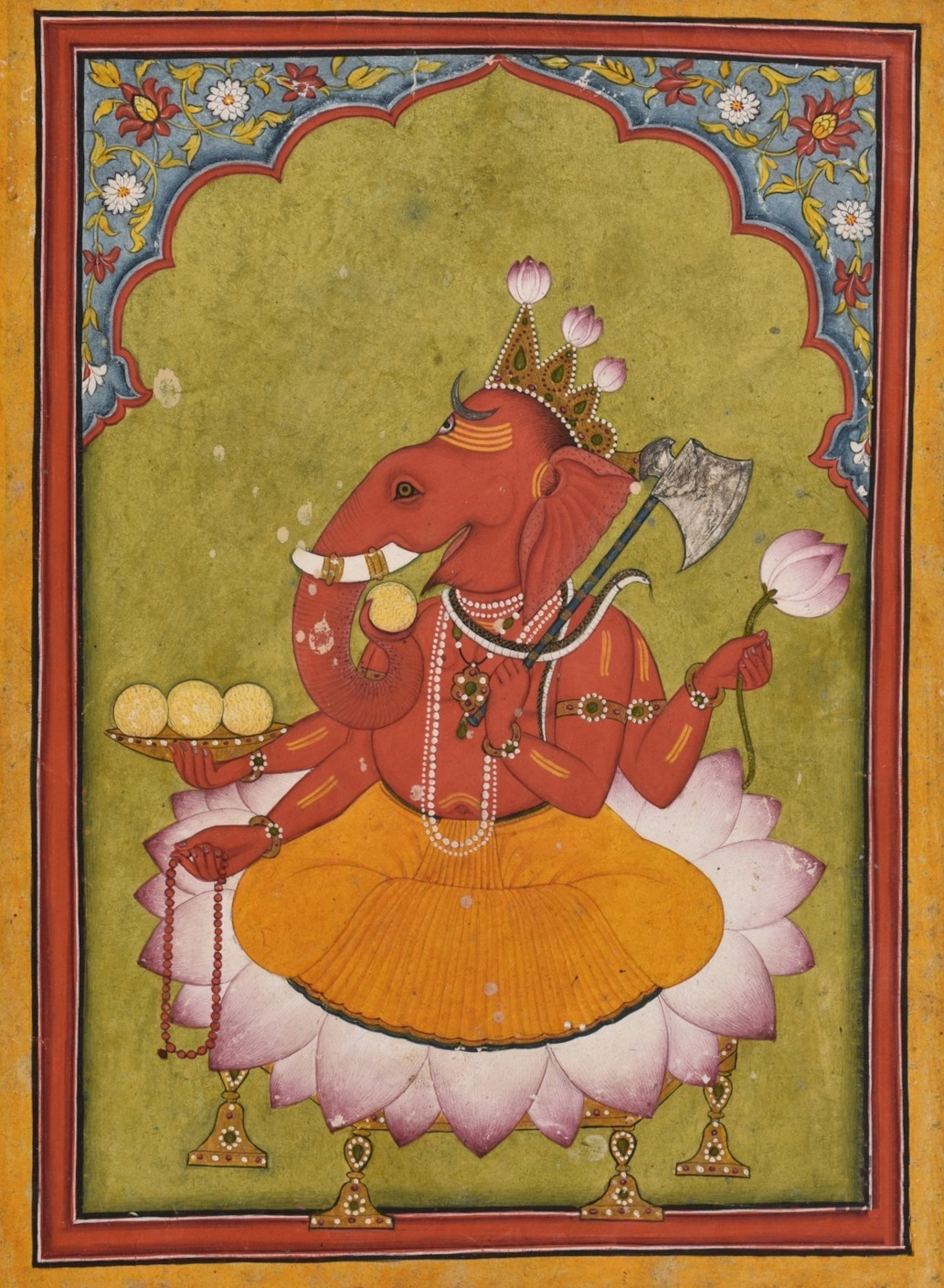
Ganesha, with Elephant's head

- Anubis – An Egyptian god with the head of a jackal.
- Bastet – An Egyptian goddess with the head of a cat.
- Cynocephalus – A dog-headed creature.
- Daksha – A Hindu god whose head was replaced with a goat's head after he was beheaded.
- Ganesha – A Hindu god with the head of an elephant.
- Hayagriva – A horse-headed avatar.
- Horse-Face – A horse-headed guardian or type of guardian of the underworld in Chinese mythology.
- Ipotane – A race of half-horse half-humans, usually depicted as the reverse of centaurs.
- Keibu Keioiba (alias Kabui Keioiba) – A Meitei folkloric mythical creature with the head of a tiger and the body of a human.
- Khnum – An Egyptian god with the head of a ram.
- Maahes, Pakhet, Sekhmet, and Tefnut – Each of these Egyptian gods has the head of a lion.
- Minotaur – A creature that has the body of a human with the head, tail, and occasional hindquarters of a bull.
- Nandi – Some Puranas describe Nandi or Nandikeshvara as bull-faced, with a human body that resembles that of Shiva in proportion and aspect.
- Narasimha – A Hindu deity with a lion-like face.
- Ox-Head – An ox-headed guardian or type of guardian of the Underworld in Chinese mythology.
- Penghou – A Chinese tree spirit with the face of a human and the body of a dog.
- Pratyangira – A Hindu goddess with the head of a lion.
- Set – An Egyptian god with a human body and the head of an unidentified creature with large upright ears known as a 'Set/Seth creature'.
- Tikbalang - A tall Filipino horse-headed man.
- Tumburu - A horse faced Hindu deity.
- Varaha – A boar-headed avatar.
- Zhu Bajie – A pig-headed major character of the novel Journey to the West.

==== Other bipeds ====
Horus, with Falcon's head

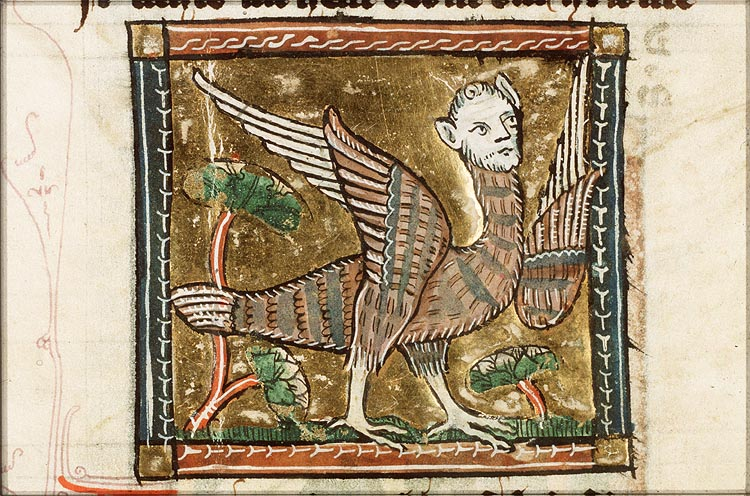
A medieval depiction of a harpy as a bird-woman

- Alkonost – A creature from Russian folklore with the head of a woman with the body of a bird, said to make beautiful sounds that make anyone who hears them forget all that they know and not want anything more ever again.
- Bird goddess – Vinca figures of a woman with a bird head.
- Cuca - A creature from Brazilian folklore and female counterpart of the Coco that is depicted as a witch with the head of an alligator. It will catch and eat children who disobey their parents.
- Gamayun – A Russian creature with the head of a woman and the body of a bird.
- Heqet – A frog-headed Egyptian god.
- Horus, Monthu, Ra, and Seker – Each of these Egyptian gods has the head of a falcon or hawk.
- Inmyeonjo – A creature from Korean mythology that has a bird-like body and human face.
- Karura – A divine creature of Japanese Hindu-Buddhist mythology with the head of a bird and the torso of a human.
- Kuk – Kuk and his counterpart Kauket respectively have the head of a frog and snake.
- Meretseger – A cobra-headed Egyptian goddess.
- Sirin – Half-bird, half-human creature with the head and chest of a woman from Russian folklore; its bird half is generally that of an owl.
- Sobek – A crocodile-headed Egyptian god.
- Thoth – An ibis-headed Egyptian god.

==== Quadrupeds ====
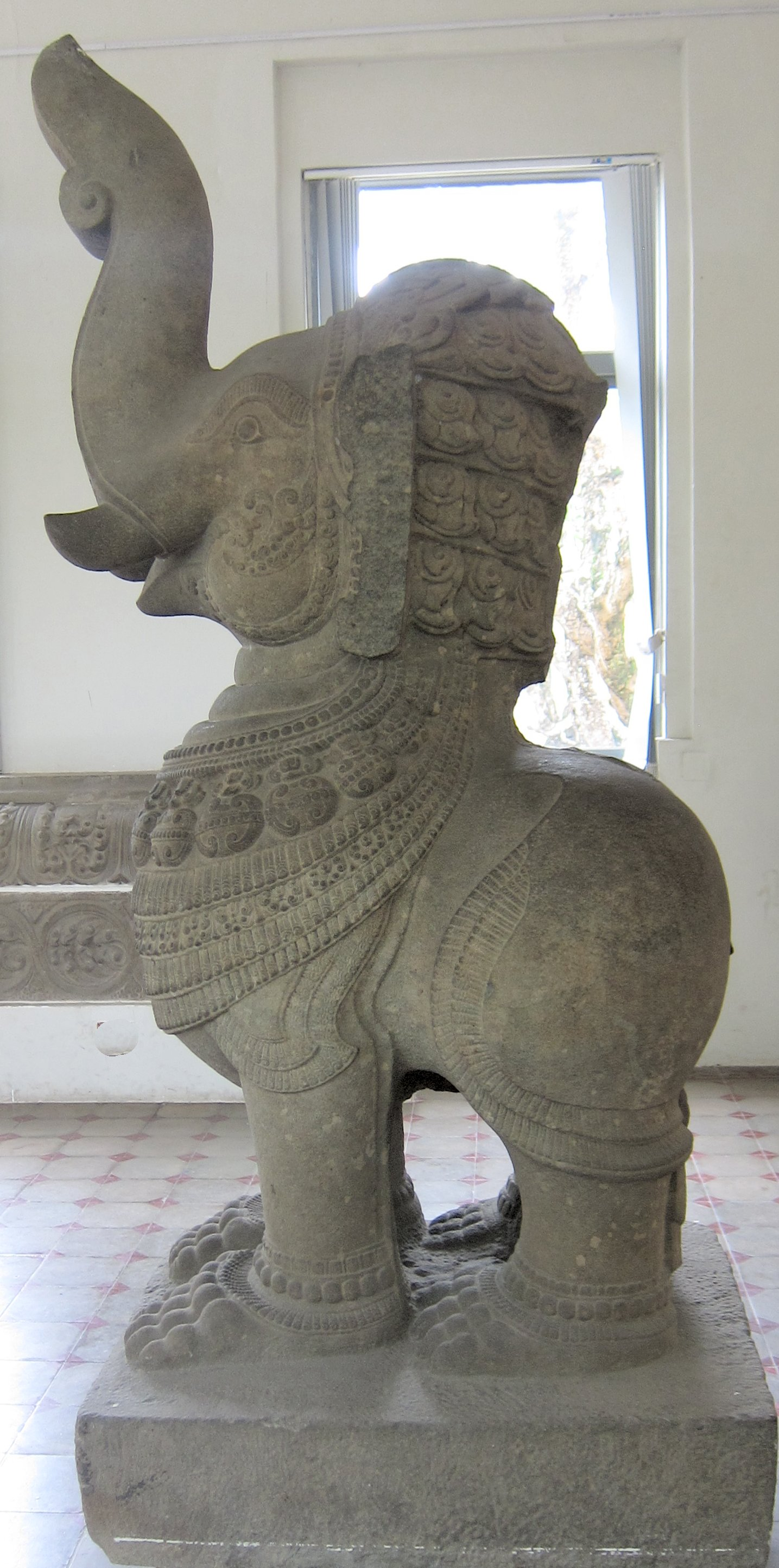
'Gajasimha', Museum of Cham Sculpture

- Akhekh - A creature from Egyptian mythology with the body of an oryx and the wings and snout of a bird. It is often depicted in Egyptian traditions as a dragon or dragon-like creature with a serpentine shape and the snout of a crocodile.
- Allocamelus – A Heraldic creature that has the head of a donkey and the body of a camel.
- Bai Ze – A creature from Chinese mythology with the head of a human and the body of a cow with six horns and nine eyes.
- Catoblepas - One version of the creature in Gustave Flaubert's The Temptation of Saint Anthony depicts it with the head of a wild boar and the body of a black African buffalo.
- Criosphinx – A Sphinx that has the head of a ram.
- Gajasimha – A creature with the head of an elephant and the body of a lion.
- Gye-lyong – A creature from Korean mythology with the head of a chicken and the body of a dragon.
- Hieracosphinx – A type of Sphinx with a hawk head.
- Jinmenken - A Japanese creature with the face of a human and the body of a dog.
- Lampago - A creature with the head of a man and the body of a lion or a tiger.
- Kudan - A Japanese creature with the face of a human and the body of a cow.
- Ninki Nanka - A reptilian creatures in Gambian folklore. It is often described as a dragon or dragon-like creature with the body of a crocodile, the neck of a giraffe and an equine head with three spikes.
- Shug Monkey – A creature that is part-monkey and part-dog.

==== Other ====
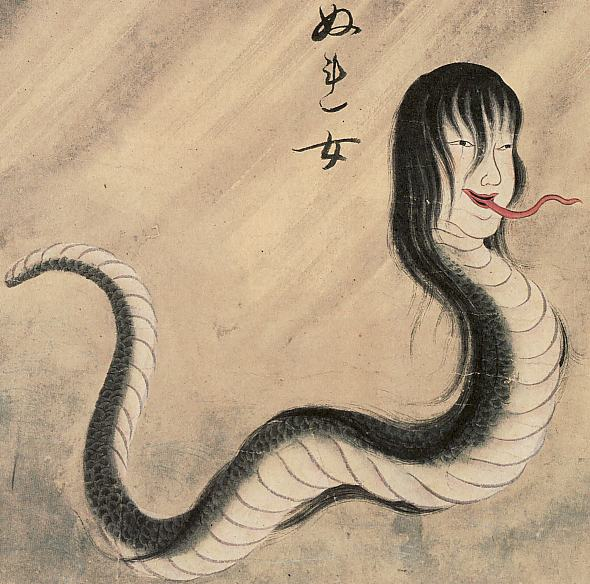
A nure-onna as depicted in Sawaki Suushi's Hyakkai-Zukan

- Atargatis – Human face, fish body.
- Cetus – greyhound or boar headed and bodies dolphin or whale
- Draconcopedes (snake-feet) – "Snake-feet are large and powerful serpents, with faces very like those of human maidens and necks ending in serpent bodies" as described by Vincent of Beauvais.
- Gajamina – A creature with the head of an elephant and body of a fish.
- Merlion – A creature with the head of a lion and the body of a fish.
- Nure-onna – A creature with the head of a woman and the body of a snake.
- Tam Đầu Cửu Vĩ or Ông Lốt - is a divine beast with three human heads and a nine-tailed snake body, the mount of the god Ông Hoàng Bơ in Đạo Mẫu in Vietnamese folk religion.
- Ugajin - A harvest and fertility kami of Japanese mythology with the body of a snake and the head of a bearded man, for the masculine variant or the head of a woman, for the female variant.
- Ushi-oni – A Yōkai with the head of a bull and the body of a spider.
- Zhuyin – A creature with the face of a man and the body of a snake.

=== Front of one animal, rear of another ===
- Echidna – A half-woman and half-snake monster that lives inside a cave.
- Fu Xi – A god said to have been created by Nu Wa.
- Glaistig – A Scottish fairy or ghost who can take the form of a goat-human hybrid.
- Griffin – A creature with the front quarters of an eagle and the hind quarters of a lion. Some depictions also depict it as having a snake-headed tail.
- Harpy – A half-bird, half-woman creature of Greek mythology, portrayed sometimes as a woman with bird wings and legs.
- Hippalectryon – A creature with the front half of a horse and the rear half has a rooster's wings, tail, and legs.
- Hippocampus (or Hippocamp) – A Greek mythological creature that is half-horse half-fish.
- Hippogriff – A creature with the front quarters of an eagle and hind quarters of a horse.
- Jengu – A water spirit with the tail of a fish.
- Ketu – An Asura who has the lower parts of a snake and said to have four arms.
- Lamia – A female with the lower body like that of a snake and is also spelled as Lamiai. This should not be confused with the Greco-Roman Lamia.
- Matsya – An avatar of Lord Vishnu that is half-man half-fish.
- Merfolk – A race of half-human, half-fish creatures. The males are called Mermen and the females are called Mermaids.
  - Auvekoejak – A merman from Inuit folklore of Greenland and northern Canada that has fur on its fish tail instead of scales.
  - Ceasg – A Scottish mermaid.
  - Sirena – A mermaid from Philippine folklore.
  - Siyokoy – Mermen with scaled bodies from Philippine folklore. It is the male counterpart of the Sirena.
- Nü Wa – A woman with the lower body of a serpent in Chinese folklore.
- Nāga – A term referring to human/snake mixes of all kinds.
- Onocentaur – A creature that has the upper body of a human with the lower body of a donkey and is often portrayed with only two legs.
- Ophiotaurus – A creature that has the upper body of a bull and the lower body of a snake.
- Peryton – A deer with the wings of a bird.
- Sea goat – A creature that is half-goat half-fish.
- Sea-griffin – A griffin variant with the hindquarters of a fish.
- Sea-lion – A creature with the head and upper body of a lion and the tail of a fish.
- Siren – Half-bird, half-woman creatures of Greek mythology who lure sailors to their deaths with their singing voices.
- Skvader – A Swedish creature with the forequarters and hind-legs of a hare and the back, wings and tail of a female wood grouse.
- Tatzelwurm – A creature with the face of a cat and a serpentine body.
- Tlanchana – An aquatic deity that is part woman and part snake.
- Triton – A Greek God and the son of Poseidon who has the same description as the Merman. Some depictions have him with two fish tails.
- Valravn – A Danish creature that in some description is half-raven half-wolf.

=== Body of one animal as head of another ===
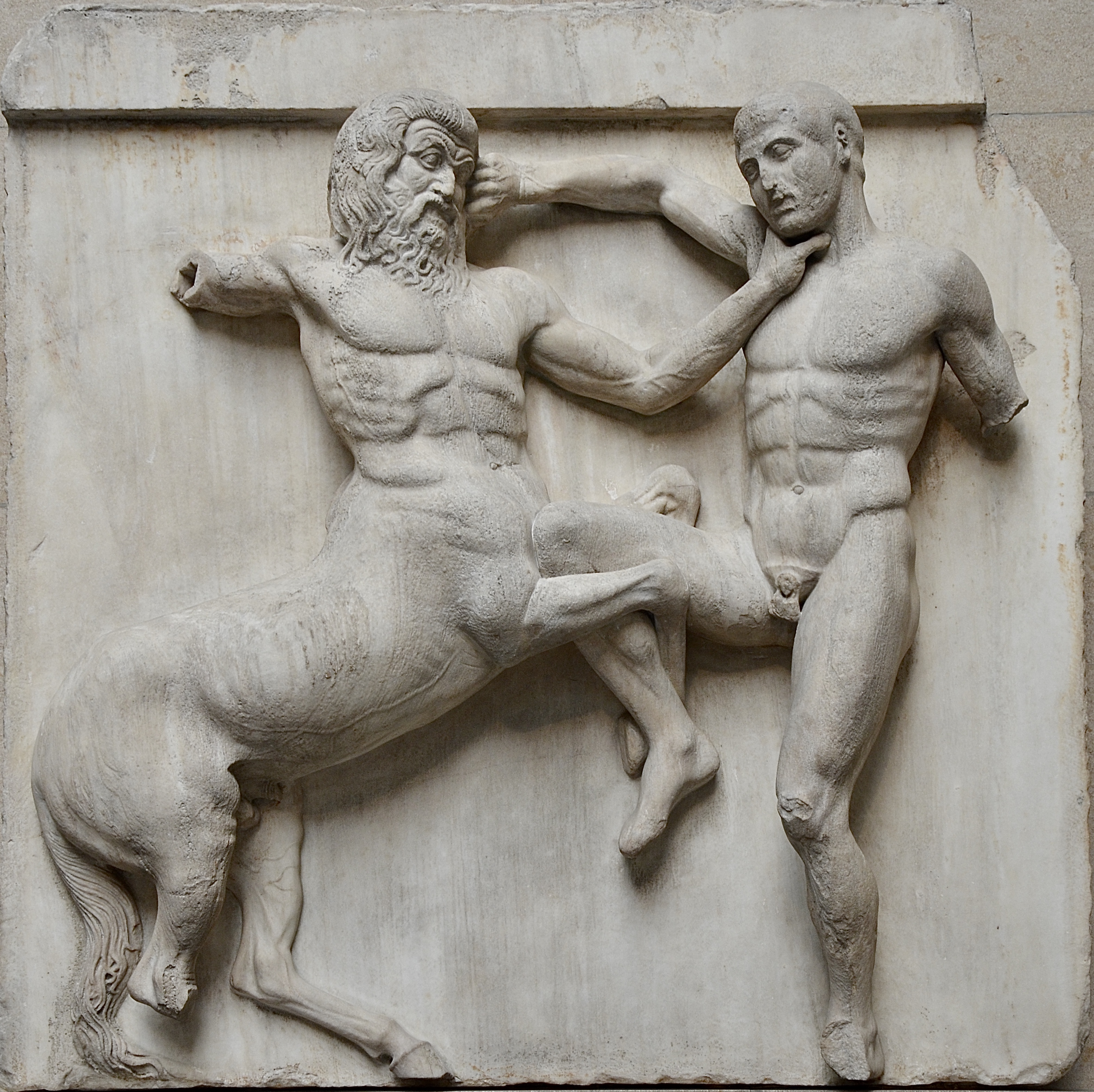
A Centaur fighting a man

- Anggitay – A strictly-female creature that has the upper body of a human with the lower body of a horse.
- Centaur – A creature that has the upper body of a human with the lower body of a horse.
- Khepri – A dung beetle-headed Egyptian god.
- Kinnara – Half-human, half-bird in later Indian mythology.
- Kurma – Upper-half human, lower-half tortoise.
- Ichthyocentaurs – Creatures that have the torsos of a man or woman, the front legs of a horse, and the tails of a fish.
- Scorpion man – Half-man half-scorpion.
- Serpopard – A creature that is part-snake and part-African leopard.

=== Animals with extra parts ===
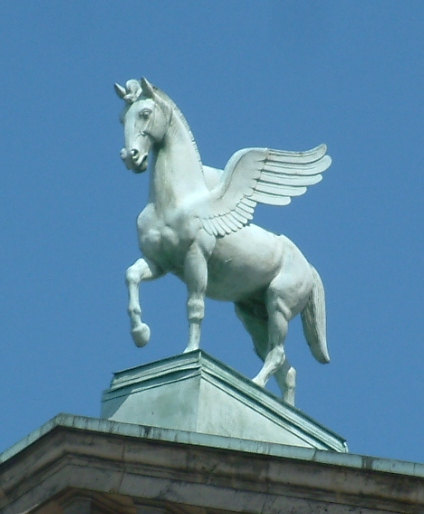
Pegasus, as the horse of Muses, was put on the roof of Poznań Opera House (Max Littmann, 1910)

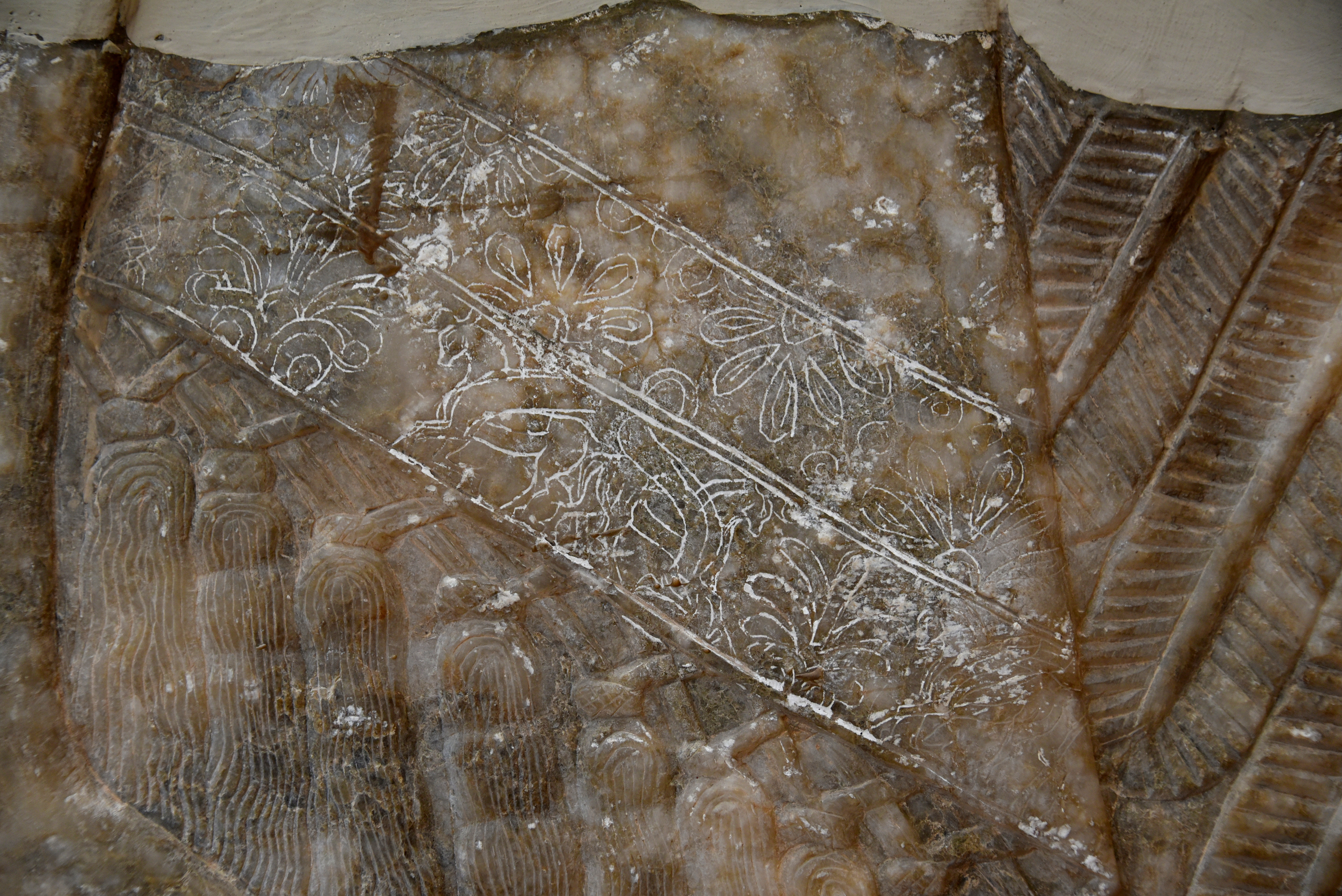
Detail of the embroidered dress of an Apkallu, showing a pair of 4-legged winged animals. From Nimrud, Iraq. 883-859 BCE. Ancient Orient Museum, Istanbul

- Angel – Humanoid creatures who are generally depicted with bird-like wings. In Abrahamic mythology and Zoroastrianism mythology, angels are often depicted as benevolent celestial beings who act as messengers between God and humans.
- Aralez - An Armenian winged dog-like creatures or spirits
- Bat – An Egyptian goddess with the horns and ears of a cow.
- Cernunnos – An ancient Gaulish/Celtic god with the antlers of a deer.
- Fairy – A humanoid with insect-like wings.
- Hathor – An Egyptian goddess with cow horns.
- Horned God – A god with horns.
- Jackalope – A jackrabbit with the horns of a whitetail deer.
- Satyr – Originally an ancient Greek nature spirit with the body of a man, but the long tail and pointed ears of a horse. From the beginning, satyrs were inextricably associated with drunkenness and ribaldry, known for their love of wine, music, and women. By the Hellenistic Period, satyrs began to be depicted as men with the horns and legs of goats, likely due to conflation with Pan. Satyrs were eventually conflated with the Roman fauns and, since roughly the second century AD, they have been indistinguishable from each other.
  - Silenos - A tutor to Dionysus who is virtually identical to satyrs and normally indistinguishable, although sometimes depicted as more elderly.
- Seraph – An elite angel with multiple wings.
- Sleipnir - Odin's magical horse with eight legs.
- Winged cat – A cat with the wings of a bird.
- Winged genie – A humanoid with bird wings.
- Winged horse – A horse with the wings of a bird.
  - Pegasus - A particular winged horse from Greek mythology. Sometimes the lowercase spelling is used as a metonym for winged horses in general.
  - Tulpar - A winged horse from Turkic mythology, though not capable of flight.
- Winged lion – A lion with the wings of a bird.

=== Body of one animal with legs and extra features of another ===
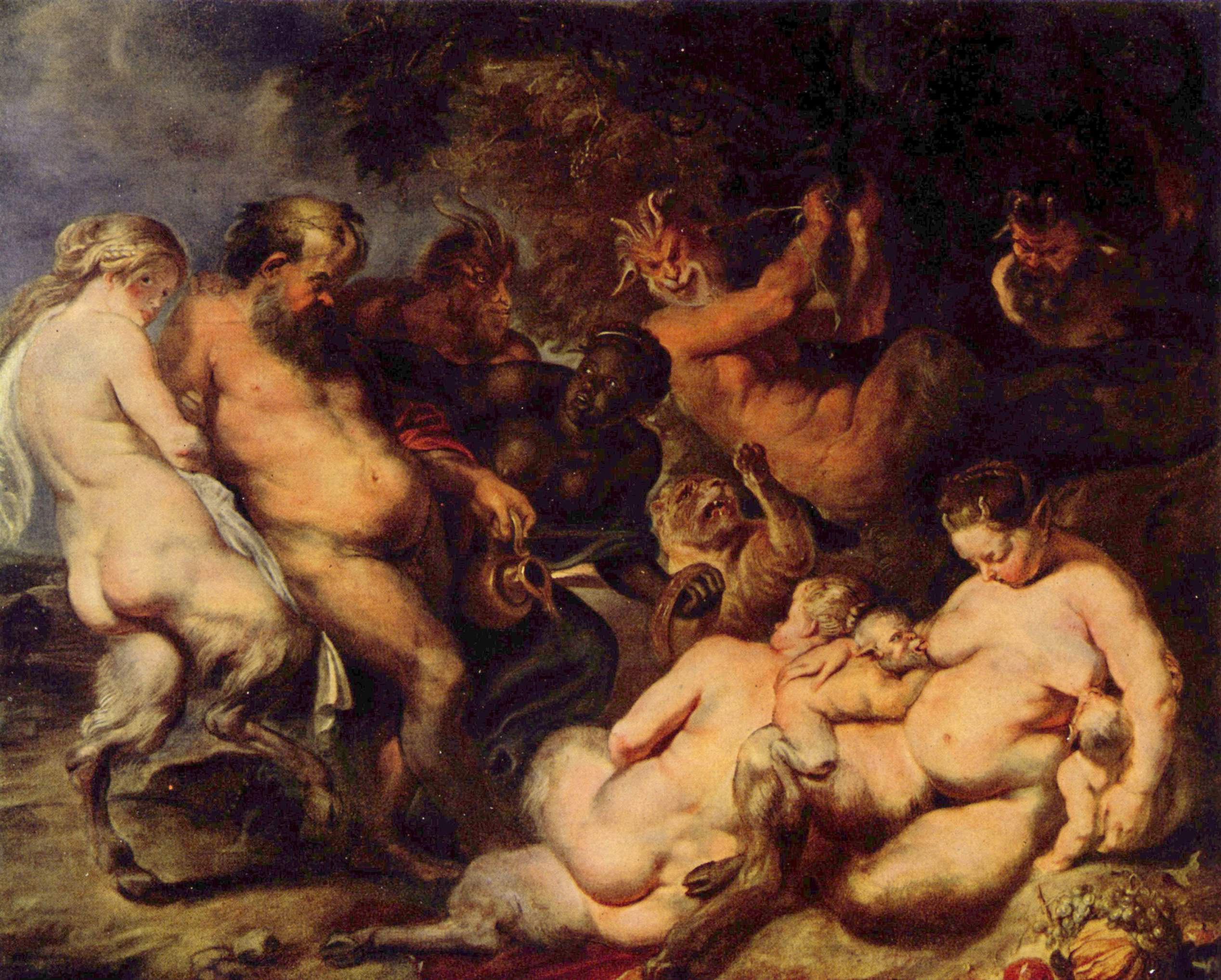
Satyr men, satyr women, and satyr children.

- Adlet – A human with dog legs.
- Bes – An Egyptian god with the hindquarters of a lion.
- Ishtar – A winged woman with bird legs found in the Burney Relief depiction.
- Faun – An ancient Roman nature spirit with the body of a man, but the legs and horns of a goat. Originally, fauns differed from the Greek satyrs because they were less frequently associated with drunkenness and ribaldry and were instead seen as "shy, woodland creatures". Starting in the first century BC, the Romans frequently conflated them with satyrs and, after the second century AD, the two became virtually indistinguishable.
- Goat people are a class of mythological beings who physically resemble humans from the waist up, and had goat-like features usually including the hind legs of goats. They fall into various categories, such as sprites, gods, demons, and demigods.
- Krampus – A Germanic mythical figure of obscure origin. It is often depicted with the legs and horns of a goat, the body of a man, and animalistic facial features.
- Kusarikku – A demon with the head, arms, and torso of a human and the ears, horns, and hindquarters of a bull.
- Lamia – Woman with duck feet.
- Pan – The god of the wild and protector of shepherds, who has the body of a man, but the legs and horns of a goat. He is often heard playing a flute.
- Sylvań – A satyr-like creature with a deer’s hooves, a fox tail, and a white coat that is woven to make their clothing.

=== Other hybrids of two kinds ===
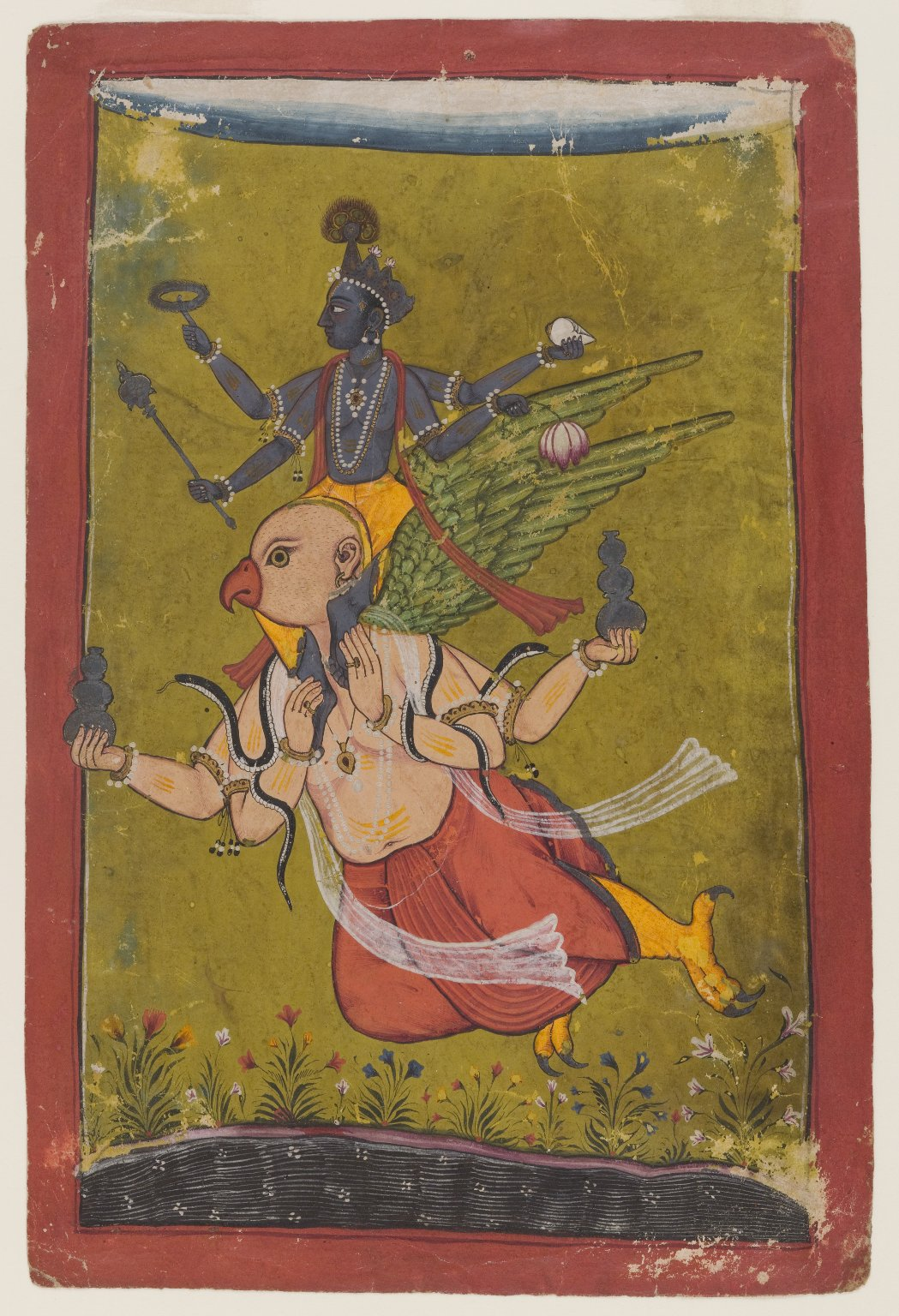
Garuda carrying his master Vishnu. Garuda has an eagle's head, wings and legs

- Alebrije – A brightly colored creature from Mexican mythology.
- Alphyn - A Heraldic creature that resembles a Tyger. Its front legs have varied from a dragons forelegs, an eagle's talons on its forelegs, or the legs or a lion.
- Anansi - A West African god, also known as Ananse, Kwaku Ananse, and Anancy. Anansi is depicted in many different ways: sometimes he looks like an ordinary spider, sometimes he is a spider wearing clothes or with a human face, and sometimes he looks much more like a human with spider elements, such as eight legs.
- Avatea – A Mangaian god that has the right half of a man and the left half of a fish.
- Bingfeng - A wild boar/pig hybrid with two heads that has elongated.
- Cerberus – A Greek mythological dog that guarded the gates of the underworld, almost always portrayed with three heads and occasionally having a mane of serpents, as well as the front half of one for a tail.
- Drakaina – A female species from Greek mythology that is draconic in nature, primarily depicted as a woman with dragon features.
- Feathered serpent - A Mesoamerican spirit deity that possessed a snake-like body and feathers, such as those of a quetzal bird.
- Garuda – A creature that has the head, wings, and legs of an eagle and body of a man.
- Gorgon – Each of them has snakes in place of their hair; sometimes also depicted with a snake-like lower body.
- Jorōgumo - Type of Japanese yōkai, depicted as a spider woman manipulating small fire-breathing spiders.
- Jumart - a fictional hybrid between a bovine and a horse or donkey in French folklore
- Musimon - A creature that has the head and horns of a ram sheep and the horns, body, and feet of a goat.
- Olano - A Spanish mythology creature that resembles a horse with a head of a dog.
- Pantheon - A creature that resembles a deer with the tail of a fox.
- Papillequine - A horse or pony with Lepidopteran wings.
- Selkie – A seal that becomes a human by shedding its skin on land.
- Karasu-tengu – A crow-type Tengu.
- Uchek Langmeidong - A half-woman and half-hornbill creature in Manipuri folklore, depicted as a girl who was turned into a bird to escape from her stepmother's torture in the absence of her father.
- Werecat – A creature that is part cat, part human, or switches between the two.
- Werehyena - A creature that is part hyena, part human, or switches between the two.
- Werewolf – A creature that becomes a wolf/human-like beast during the nights of the full moon, but is human otherwise.
- Wyvern – A creature with a dragon's head and wings, a reptilian body, two legs, and a tail often ending in a diamond- or arrow-shaped tip.
- Zamba Zaara - A hedgehog cryptid with an Ankylosauria-like tail who hits the earth and causing the earth shaking violently.

=== Hybrids of three kinds ===
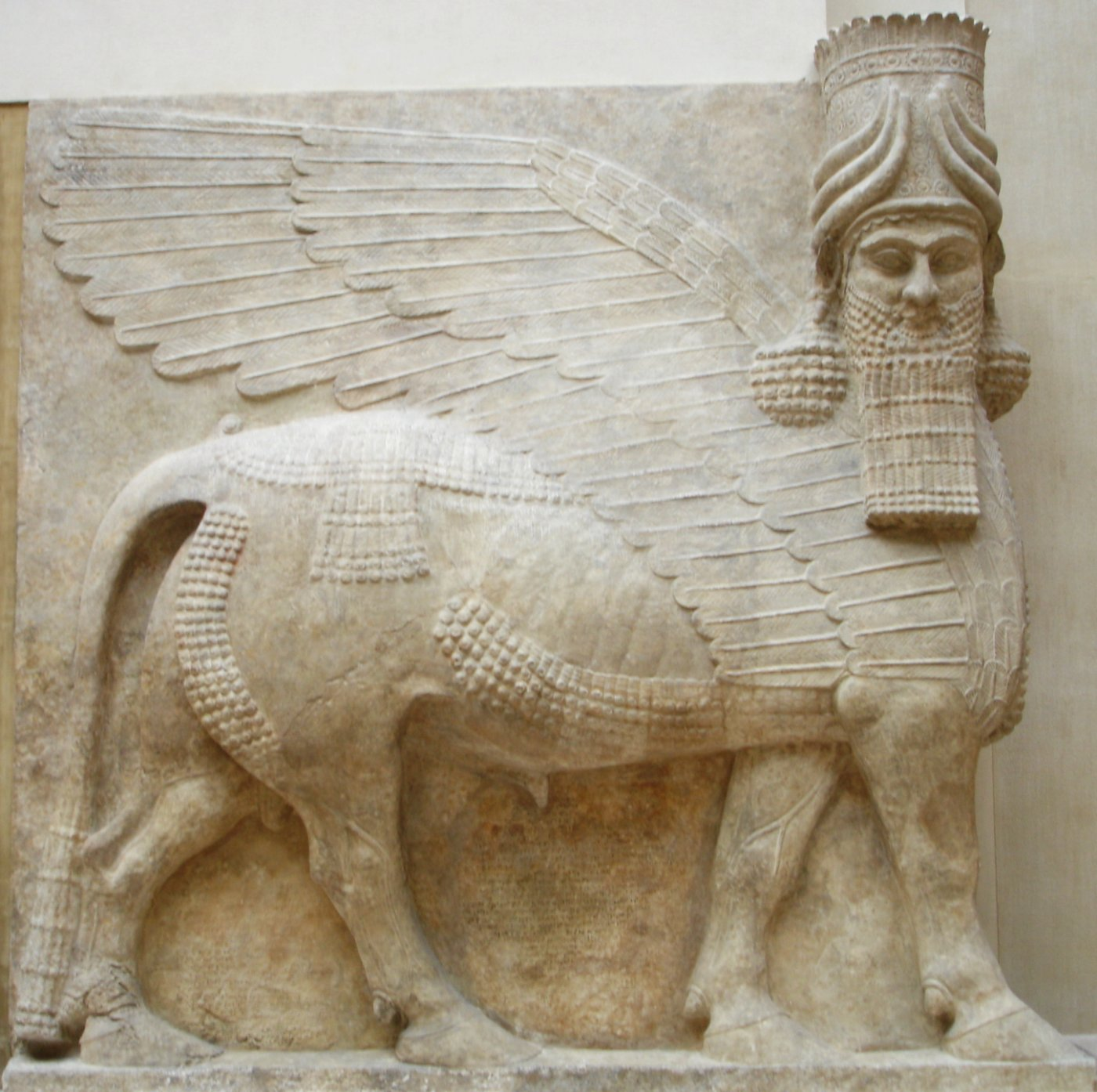
Assyrian lamassu dated 721, BCE Oriental Institute Museum, University of Chicago.

Carved Māori manaia

- Ammit – An Egyptian creature with the head of a crocodile, the front legs of a lion, and the back legs and hindquarters of a hippopotamus.
- Baphomet – Traditionally depicted as an anthropomorphic creature with goat's head.
- Buraq – A creature from Arabic iconography that has the head of a man and the body of a winged horse.
- Capelobo - A creature from Brazilian folklore with the head of an anteater, the torso of a human, and the legs of a goat.
- Chalkydri – Creatures with twelve angel wings, the body of a lion, and the head of a crocodile mentioned in 2 Enoch
- Chi You – A creature from Chinese mythology with the head of a bull, the torso of a human, and the ears and hindquarters of a bear.
- Cipactli – A creature from Aztec mythology that is part crocodilian, part fish, and part toad or frog.
- Chimera – A Greek mythological creature with the head and front legs of a lion, the head and back legs of a goat, and the head of a snake for a tail. Said to be able to breathe fire from lion's mouth.
- Cockatrice – A mix between a chicken, a bat, and a reptile.
- Hatuibwari – A dragon-like creature with the head of a human with four eyes, the body of a serpent, and the wings of a bat.
- Hundun - A creature with the body of a pig, the legs of a lion or bear and four wings of a bird, with no head.
- Kappa - A Japanese humanoid creature with the legs of a frog and the head and shell of a turtle.
- Lamassu – A deity that is often depicted with a human head, a bull's body or lion's body, and an eagle's wings.
- Longma – A winged horse with the scales of a dragon.
- Manaia — a Māori protective spirit with the head of a bird and the tail of a fish, often depicted with the body of a human.
- Manticore - A creature with the face of a human, the body of a lion, and the tail of a scorpion. Some versions also depict it with the wings of a dragon.
- Opinicus - A griffin variant with the head and wings of an eagle, the body and legs of a lion, and the neck and tail of a dromedary.
- Pamola - A creature from Abenaki mythology with a human body, the head of a moose, with the wings and feet of an eagle that protects Maine's tallest mountain.
- Sharabha – A Hindu mythological creature having the head of a lion, the legs of deer, and the wings of bird.
- Sphinx – A creature with the head of a human or a cat, the body of a lion, and occasional wings of an eagle.

=== Hybrids of four kinds ===
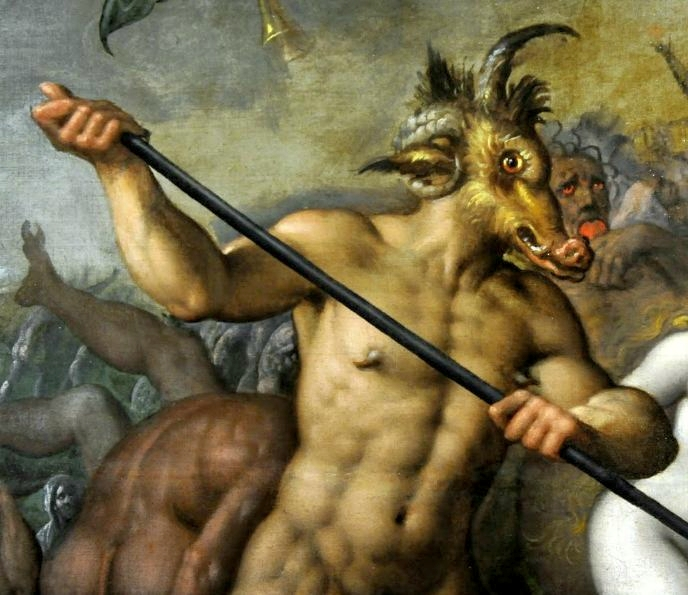
Horns of a goat and a ram, goat's fur and ears, nose and canines of a pig, and mouth of a dog, a typical depiction of the devil in Christian art. The goat, ram, dog and pig are animals consistently associated with the Devil. Detail of a 16th-century painting by Jacob de Backer in the National Museum in Warsaw.

- Abraxas – A god-like Gnostic creature with many different types of portrayals, many of which as different types of hybrids.
- Cherub – Described as having a two pairs of wings, and four faces like a lion, ox, man, and eagle.
- Dahu – A goat-like creature, known for its uneven-sized legs. It has a morphological appearance of a chamois, the horns of an ibex, a tail of a cattle, and droopy ears of a dog.
- Chouyu - A Rabbit/hare-like creature with the face of an owl and a reptilian tail.
- Enfield – A Heraldic creature with the head of a fox, the forelegs and sometimes wings of an eagle, the body of a lion, and the tail of a wolf.
- Hatsadiling – A mythical creature with the head and body of a lion, trunk and tusks of an elephant, the comb of a rooster, and the wings of a bird.
- Jiao - Dog-like canine with leopard spots, ox horns, and a short tail.
- Kamadhenu – A creature with the head of a human, the body of a cow, the wings of a pigeon, and the tail of a peacock.
- Monoceros – A creature with the head of a deer, the body of a horse, the feet of an elephant, and the tail of a pig.
- Nue – A Japanese Chimera with the head of a monkey, the legs of a tiger, the body of a Japanese raccoon dog, and the front half of a snake for a tail.
- Qilin – A Chinese creature with the head and scales of a dragon, the antlers of a deer, the hooves of an ox, and the tail of a lion. The Japanese version is described as a deer-shaped dragon with the tail of an ox.
- Questing Beast – A creature with the head and tail of a serpent, the feet of a deer, the body of a leopard, and the haunches of a lion.
- Simurgh – A griffin-like creature of Persian mythology with the head of a dog, the body of a lion, the tail of a peacock, and the wings of a hawk.
- Taweret – An Egyptian goddess depicted as a bipedal female hippopotamus with human breasts, the limbs of a lion, and the back and tail of a Nile crocodile.
- Tyger - A creature with the body of a tiger, the jaws of a wolf, the mane of a horse, and the tufted tail of a lion.
- Wolpertinger – A creature with the head of a rabbit, the body of a squirrel, the antlers of a deer, and the legs and wings of a pheasant.
- Yali – A Hindu creature with the head of a lion, the tusks of an elephant, the body of a cat, and the tail of a serpent.
- Ypotryll – A Heraldic creature with the tusked head of a boar, the humped body of a camel, the legs and hooves of an ox or goat, and the tail of a snake.

=== Hybrids of more than four kinds ===
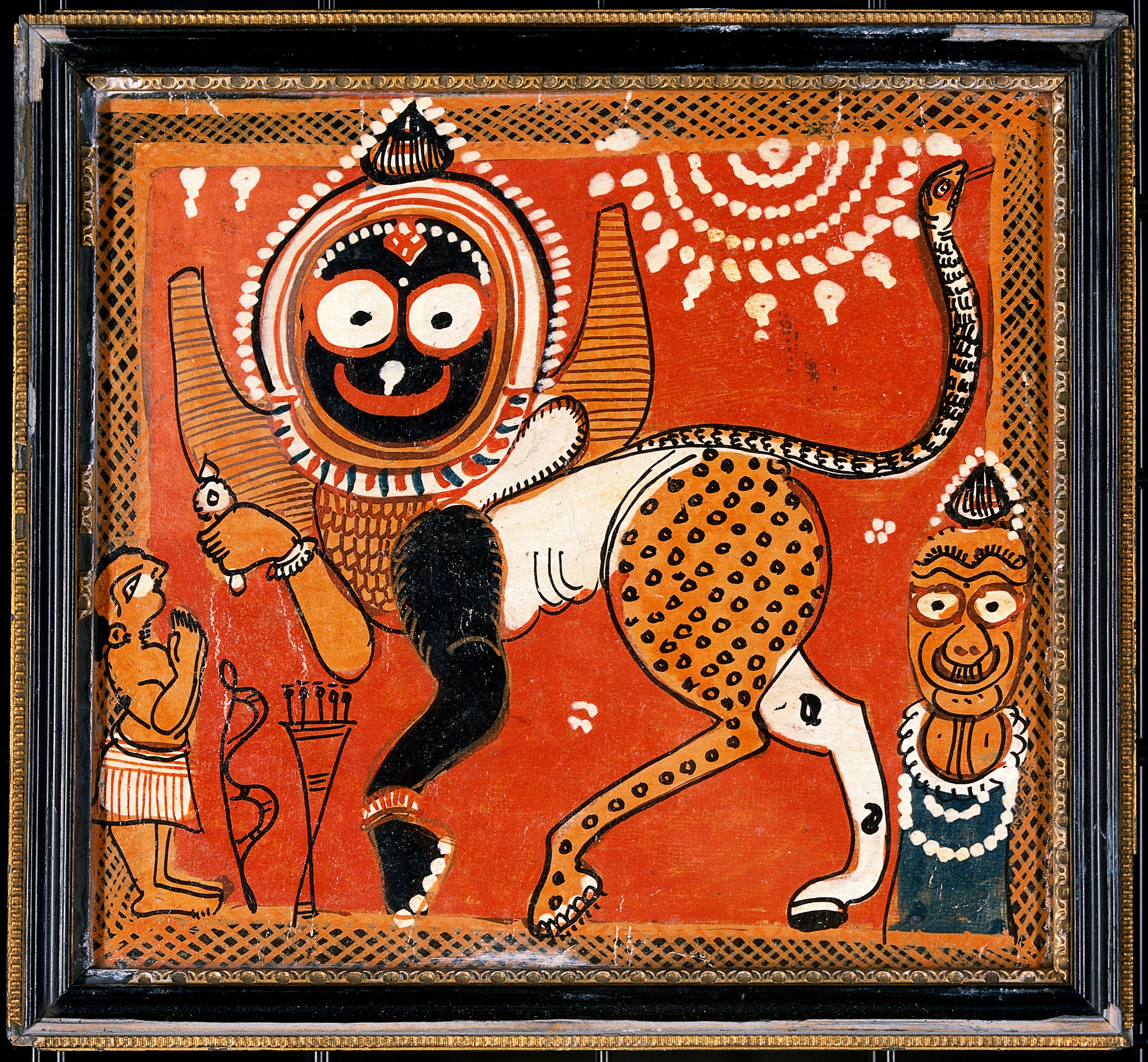
Navagunjara, has limb representing eight animals, including a human hand.

- Baku – A Japanese creature with the head of an elephant, the ears of a rhinoceros, the legs of a tiger, the body of a bear, and the tail of a cow.
- Bo - A horse-like equine with a single black unicorn-like horn, the mouth and paws of tiger's, and ears of leopard.
- Bulgasari - A Korean creature with the eyes of a rhinoceros, the trunk of an elephant, the body of a bear, the claws of a tiger, and the tail of a bull.
- Calygreyhound – A mythical creature described as having the head of a wildcat, the torso of a deer or antelope, the claws of an eagle as its forefeet, ox hooves, antlers or horns on its head, the hind legs of a lion or ox, and its tail like a lion or poodle.
- Dingonek – a large aquatic creature with the head of a Leopard or an Otter with the fangs of a Walrus, the body of a Whale with the armor of an Armadillo and the tail of a Sea Snake.
- Fenghuang – A Chinese creature with the head of a golden pheasant, the body of a mandarin duck, the tail of a peacock, the legs of a crane, the mouth of a parrot and the wings of a swallow.
- Kotobuki - A Japanese Chimera with the head of a rat, the ears of a rabbit, the horns of an ox, the comb of a rooster, the beard of a sheep, the neck of a Japanese dragon, the mane of a horse, the back of a wild boar, the shoulders and belly of a South China tiger, the arms of a monkey, the hindquarters of a dog, and the tail of a snake.
- Meduza – A sea creature from Russian folklore with the head of a maiden and the body of a striped beast, having a dragon tail with a snake's mouth and elephant legs with the same snake mouths.
- Navagunjara – A Hindu creature with the head of a rooster, the neck of a peacock, the back of a bull, a snake-headed tail, three legs of an elephant, tiger and deer or horse with the fourth limb being a human hand holding a lotus.
- Nawarupa – A Burmese creature with the head, trunk, and tusks of an elephant, the eyes of a deer, the horns of a rhinoceros, the wings and tongue of a parrot, the body and legs of a lion and the tail of a peacock.
- Pyinsarupa – A Burmese creature made of a bullock, carp, elephant, horse and the dragon.
- Scylla – A monster from Greek mythology which has the body of a woman, six snake heads, twelve octopus tentacles, a cat's tail and four dog heads in her waist.
- Tarasque – A French dragon with the head of a lion, six short legs similar to that of bear legs, the body of an ox, the shell of a turtle, and a scorpion stinger-tipped tail.

== Modern fiction ==
The following hybrid creatures appear in modern fiction:

=== Dungeons & Dragons ===
- Dracimera – Half-chimera, half-dragon. It is the result of a union between a dragon and a chimera.
- Dracotaur – Half-man, half-dragon. It debuted in Dungeons & Dragons. It also has a counterpart in the form of the Dragonspawn from the Warcraft franchise. Dragoon from the Monster Rancher franchise also fits this description due to it being a fusion of a Dragon and a Centaur.
- Drider – Half-drow, half-spider, a "monster that looks like a centaur only with the bottom half of a spider instead of a horse."
- Gnoll – Vicious part-hyena part-men creatures. It debuted in Dungeons & Dragons and then spread to other franchises including Warcraft and Pathfinder. It is inspired by but does not resemble the gnoles conceived by Lord Dunsany. Considered one of the "five main 'humanoid' races" in AD&D by Paul Karczag and Lawrence Schick and a classic of D&D by reviewer Dan Wickline. Within D&D, the demon lord Yeenoghu is worshipped by gnolls.
- Gorgimera – Half-gorgon (a monster like a catoblepas), half-chimera. It is the result of a union between a gorgon and a chimera whose goat's head is replaced by a gorgon's head.
- Gorilla bear – A creature with the head, body, and legs of a gorilla, and the teeth and arms of a bear. It debuted in the Fiend Folio as one of the (according to TheGamer) more "silly monster designs".
- Mantimera – Half-manticore, half-chimera. It is the result of a union between a manticore and a chimera whose lion's head is replaced by a manticore's head where the creature is sterile.
- Owlbear – A creature that is half-bear, half-owl. It debuted in Dungeons & Dragons.
- Thessalmera – half-thessalhydra (a monster with hydra-like heads surrounding a large mouth), half-chimera. It is the result of a union between a thessalhydra and a chimera.
- Wemic – Half-man, half-lion with a centaur-like build. It debuted in Dungeons & Dragons. It also has a counterpart in the form of the liontaur from the Quest for Glory video games.
- Wereape - Half-man, half-ape. They have been featured in Dungeons & Dragons and have spread to other franchise like Forgotten Realms and The Wereworld Series. They come in different varieties.
  - Weregorilla - A gorilla-type wereape. Two appeared in The Wereworld Series and a monster mask of a weregorilla was advertised in episode 1 of Creepshow.
  - Wereorangutan - An orangutan-type wereape. One appeared in The Wereworld Series.
- Wolftaur – Half-man, half-wolf with a centaur-like build. It debuted in Dungeons & Dragons. Some depictions of this creature also have wolf heads like Celious from the Monster Rancher franchise (who is depicted as a fusion of a tiger and a centaur) and AdventureQuest 3D (as a lychimera).

=== Jurassic Park ===
The Jurassic Park franchise had these hybrids in the films, toylines, and video games.

- Amargosaurus - A hybrid of an Amargasaurus and a Spinosaurus. It appeared in the Jurassic Park: Chaos Effect toyline.
- Ankylodocus - This dinosaur was made from the DNA of a Diplodocus and an Ankylosaurus. It debuted in Lego Jurassic World: The Indominus Escape and appeared in Jurassic World: The Game and Jurassic World Evolution.
- Ankyloranodon - A hybrid of a Pteranodon and a Ankylosaurus. It appeared in the Jurassic Park: Chaos Effect toyline.
- Carnoraptor - This dinosaur was made from the DNA of a Pyroraptor and a Carnotaurus. It debuted in Lego Jurassic World: The Indominus Escape (where it was mistakenly claimed that Velociraptor DNA was used to make it) and appeared Jurassic World: The Game and the Jurassic World: Dino Hybrid toyline.
- Compsteganathus - A hybrid of a Compsognathus, a Stegosaurus, and a tree frog. It debuted in the Jurassic Park: Chaos Effect toyline.
- Indominus rex - This dinosaur was made from the DNA of a Tyrannosaurus, a Velociraptor, a cuttlefish, a tree frog, a pit viper, a Viavenator, an Aucasaurus, a Carnotaurus, a Giganotosaurus, an Abelisaurus, a Quilmesaurus, a Pycnonemosaurus, an Afrovenator, a Therizinosaurus, a Deinosuchus, a Majungasaurus, and a Rugops. It debuted in Jurassic World.
- Indoraptor - This dinosaur was made from the DNA of an Indominus rex and a Velociraptor. It debuted in Jurassic World: Fallen Kingdom.
- Paradeinonychus - A hybrid of a Parasaurolophus and a Deinonychus. It debuted in the Jurassic Park: Chaos Effect toyline.
- Scorpios Rex - This dinosaur was made from the DNA of a Carnotaurus, a Tyrannosaurus, a Velociraptor, a tree frog, and a scorpionfish. It debuted in Jurassic World: Camp Cretaceous.
- Spinoceratops - This dinosaur was made from the DNA of a Sinoceratops and a Spinosaurus. It debuted in Jurassic World: Camp Cretaceous where it was created by Mantah Corp and also appeared in Jurassic World: Alive.
- Spinoraptor - This dinosaur was made from the DNA of a Spinosaurus and a Utahraptor. It debuted in Lego Jurassic World: The Indominus Escape and appeared in Jurassic World: The Game and Jurassic World Evolution (the latter had the Utahraptor DNA substituted with Velociraptor DNA).
- Stegoceratops - This dinosaur was made from the DNA of a Stegosaurus and a Triceratops. It was cut from Jurassic World, but it appeared in the toyline, Lego Jurassic World: The Indominus Escape, and the associated video games.
- Tanaconda - A hybrid of a Tanystropheus and an anaconda. It debuted in the Jurassic Park: Chaos Effect toyline.
- Tyrannonops - A hybrid of a Tyrannosaurus and a Lycaenops. It debuted in the Jurassic Park: Chaos Effect toyline.
- Ultimasaurus – This dinosaur has the head and body of a Tyrannosaurus, the frill and horns of a Triceratops, the arms and legs of a Velociraptor, the back armor and the tail club of an Ankylosaurus, and the thagomizer and dermal plates of a Stegosaurus. This hybrid dinosaur is featured in the Jurassic Park: Chaos Effect toyline, but the action figure of the adult was not released.
- Velocirapteryx - A hybrid of a Velociraptor and an Archaeopteryx. It debuted in the Jurassic Park: Chaos Effect toyline.

=== Other fiction ===
- Beast (Beauty and the Beast) - The Beast, from the Disney film Beauty and the Beast, has the head structure and horns of a wisent, the arms and body of a bear, the eyebrows of a gorilla, the jaws, teeth, and mane of a lion, and the legs and tail of a wolf. He also bears resemblance to mythical monsters like the Minotaur or a werewolf.
- Butatō - Suid humanoid barbarians with snake-like fangs. Appeared any anime such as Inuyasha, That Time I Got Reincarnated as a Slime, Sword Art Online, Daily Life with a Monster Girl, Dragon Quest, etc).

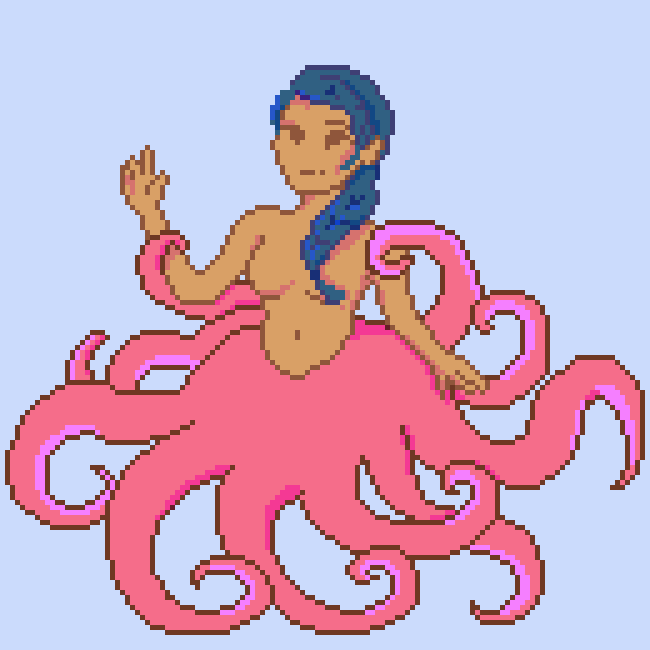
Cecaelia is a half-human, half-octopus.

- Cecaelia – Half-human, half-octopus. The term was coined by fans in the late 2000s to describe characters such as Ursula from The Little Mermaid and may also apply to Harry Styles in the music video of "Music for a Sushi Restaurant". The term is likely derived from "a short pictorial story published in Vampirella magazine entitled 'Cilia'" (1972) by Nicola Cuti and Felix Mas featuring a mysterious "woman whose lower body morphs into tentacles".
- Cervitaur – A deer-type centaur. This description was also used for the Golden Hind from Hercules: The Legendary Journeys and "Young Hercules".
- Cheetaur – Half-man, half-cheetah with a centaur-like build. They are featured in the Quest for Glory video games.
- Dhinnabarrada - A human where the waist down has varied from either an emu or cassowary legs. It is featured in Warriors of Myth.
- Feathercat - A cat with bird wings that appears in Skylanders.
- Gryf - A dinosaur in Tarzan the Terrible that resembles an omnivorous 20 ft. Triceratops with unspecified claws, the teeth of a Tyrannosaurus, and the plates of a Stegosaurus on its back.
- Gwazi – A creature with the head of a tiger and the body of a lion. This is the mascot of the roller coaster Iron Gwazi located at the Busch Gardens amusement park in Tampa, Florida.
- Jackalote - A hybrid of a jackal and a coyote. They appear in The Christmas Chronicles 2 where Belsnickel created them through an unknown method so that they would pull his sleigh.
- Jaguaro (The Scooby-Doo Show) – A creature with the head of a black Smilodon and the body of a Gorilla.
- Jaquin – A creature that resembles a jaguar with the wings and feathers of macaws. It is featured in Elena of Avalor.
- Kalidahs – Half tiger, half bear creatures first appearing in the book The Wonderful Wizard of Oz by L. Frank Baum.
- Kars - The leader of the Pillar Men and the main villain of Battle Tendency, the second part of JoJo's Bizarre Adventure. After putting on the Aja mask and transforming into the ultimate being, Kars gains bird-like wings with sharp feathers he uses as projectiles, tentacles like an octopus which he uses to fight, and a shell like an armadillo which he uses to shield himself from attacks.
- Kimkoh – A large arthropod-like alien creature from the Contra franchise that has two large frog-like legs, its upper head possesses a snout similar to that of a tapir with fangs, the upper head's fangs and nose are directly connected to the main head, giving the impression of biting it. This main head is human surrounded by elephant tusks. It features hermit crab-like legs sprouting out from underneath the human face and a shell of an armadillo.
- Kitsunicorn - A hybrid of a unicorn and a kitsune.
- ManBearPig – Half-man, half-bear, half-pig. Debuted in the titular episode of the animated television series South Park.
- Miga - A fictional sea creature that is half-killer whale, half-Kermode bear who is one of the mascots of the 2010 Winter Olympics.
- Posleen – A crocodile-headed reptilian centaur from Legacy of the Aldenata.
- Sumi – An animal guardian spirit with the wings of a Thunderbird and the legs of an American black bear who is the mascot of the 2010 Winter Paralympics.
- Tizzie-Whizie - Fairy hedgehogs with pair of antennas and wings of bee, a fluffy tail of fox and squirrel.
- Toodee – A blue monster with the body and skin of a dinosaur, the scales and spikes of a dragon, and the face, ears and whiskers of a rabbit. She is debuted in Yo Gabba Gabba!.
- Unitaur – A unicorn-type centaur.
- Ursagryph – A creature with the head, claws, and wings of an eagle, the body of a bear, and a short reptilian tail. The Predacon Darksteel from Transformers Prime Beast Hunters: Predacons Rising transforms into a mechanical Ursagryph.
- Vampire-werewolf hybrid – These half-vampire half-werewolf hybrids had been shown in various media appearances like AdventureQuest (as a Werepyre), AdventureQuest Worlds (also as a Werepyre), Axe Cop (as a Wolvye), Supernatural, The Elder Scrolls, The Vampire Diaries, the Underworld franchise (as a Lycan-dominant vampire hybrids and a Lycan-Corvinus strain hybrid), and Werewolf: The Apocalypse.
- Vinicius – Part-cat, part-monkey, part-bird from Rio 2016.
- Zoras - Half-man half-fish. Appear in most games in The Legend of Zelda franchise.
- Hornsent, Misbegotten and Omen - Hornsent have tangled goat-like horns, Omen share these same horns but in much more excess, but also often have fur, feathers, animal tails and wings with mixed traits from bats and birds, and Misbegotten are generally a mixture of several animal traits, claws, fangs, lion-like manes, feathered wings, scales and tails. All three appear in the Elden Ring games.

== See also ==
- Physiognomy
- Shapeshifting
- Theriocephaly
- Zoomorphism
