= Engineers Australia =

Australian professional association

- Formation: 1 August 1919 as the Institution of Engineers of Australia
- Type: Professional Society
- Location: Barton, Australian Capital Territory
- Chief Executive Officer: Romilly Madew
- Website: www.engineersaustralia.org.au

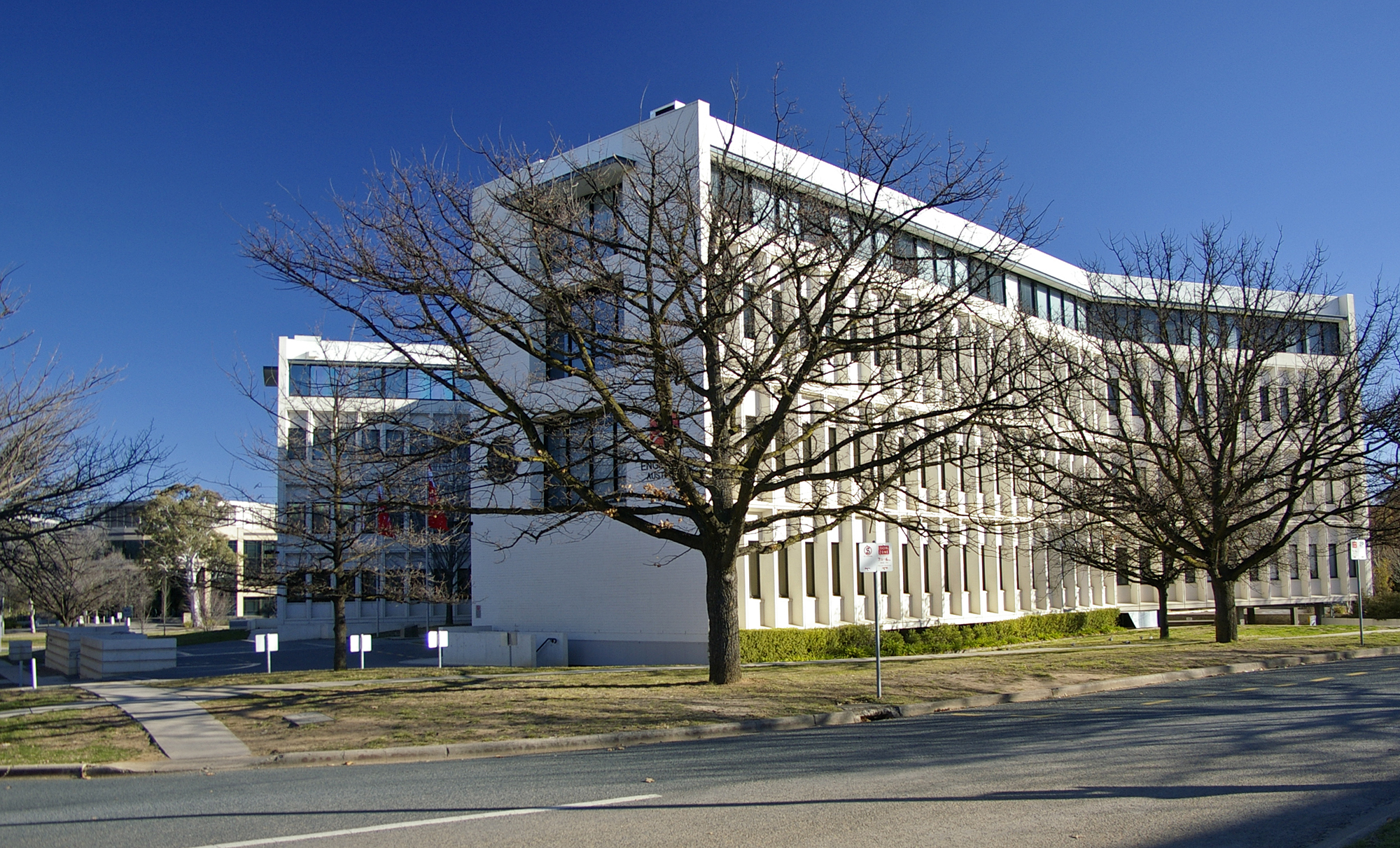
Engineering House, the national office for Engineers Australia in Barton, Australian Capital Territory

Engineers Australia (EA), known formally as the Institution of Engineers, Australia, is an Australian professional body and not-for-profit organisation whose purpose is to advance the science and practice of engineering for the benefit of the community. Engineers Australia is Australia's recognised organisation for accreditation of professional engineering qualifications under the Washington Accord. As of 2022, EA had 115,000 members, including 31,000 students.

== History ==
The association began after World War I, following recognition of the need for a single body to represent engineers, rather than multiple smaller associations. The first council meeting of this single body was held in 1919, electing Professor William Warren of the University of Sydney as the first president and instigating the Institution of Engineers of Australia. On 1 May 1926 the Institution was incorporated as a company limited by guarantee. Twelve years later, on 10 March 1938 His Majesty King George VI granted a charter of incorporation to the Institution, reconstituting it as a body corporate and politic by royal charter.

The Institution of Engineers Australia is now known as Engineers Australia (EA). Engineers Australia wholly owns two subsidiaries, Engineering Education Australia and EngInsure. Engineers Australia previously had a publishing subsidiary Engineers Media which published the organisation's main magazine. Engineers Media ceased operations at the end of August 2015 after the magazine "create" was outsourced to a commercial publisher, Mahlab Media.

== Membership ==
Membership is open to a variety of occupations. Membership is a requirement to seek credentials such as "Chartered".

=== Membership types ===
Engineers Australia has the following membership types:

- Student: free for students studying engineering
- Graduate: for people who have completed an accredited or recognised engineering qualification
- Member: same as graduate but with 3 years experience in industry
- Fellow: same as member but with evidence of eminence

=== Occupational categories ===
The occupational categories are:

- Professional engineer, hold a 4-year engineering degree
- Engineering technologist, hold a 3-year engineering degree
- Engineering associate, hold a 2-year advanced diploma or associate engineering degree
- Engineering manager, for overseas engineers whose qualifications don’t fit one of the three other categories

=== Colleges and College National Committees ===
The Colleges and College National Committees are:

- Biomedical College
- Chemical College
- Civil College
- Electrical College
- Environmental College
- Information, Telecommunications and Electronics Engineering College
- College of Leadership and Management
- Mechanical College
- Structural College

=== Chartered Areas of Practice ===
The Chartered Areas of Practice are:

- Aerospace Engineering
- Amusement Rides and Devices Engineering
- Asset Management
- Biomedical Engineering
- Building Services Engineering
- Chemical Engineering
- Civil Engineering
- Construction Engineering
- Cost Engineering
- Electrical Engineering
- Environmental Engineering
- Fire Safety Engineering
- Geotechnical Engineering
- Heritage and Conservation Engineering
- Information, Telecommunications and Electronics Engineering (ITEE)
- Leadership and management
- Mechanical Engineering
- Mechatronics Engineering
- Naval Architecture
- Oil and Gas Pipeline Engineering
- Petroleum Engineering
- Pressure Equipment Design Verification
- Project Management
- Risk Engineering
- Structural Engineering
- Subsea Engineering
- System Engineering

=== Membership for non-engineers ===
- Affiliate: open to people who don't hold formal engineering qualifications, but have an active interest in the engineering profession
- Companion: same as an Affiliate, with evidence of eminence

=== Credentials and other statuses ===
- Chartered: In Australia, the Chartered credential is the highest available technical credential for a member, and is exclusive to Engineers Australia. Chartered is nationally and internationally recognised.
- Honorary Fellow: same as Fellow, a person who has rendered conspicuous service to the Australian People, or in recognition of outstanding achievement, or is a distinguished person as determined by the Board of EA. Honary Fellows must be living, and there is a cap of 200.

=== Notable Fellows ===
Notable Fellows of Engineers Australia include:

- Derek Abbott
- Rose Amal
- Eliathamby Ambikairajah
- Matt Barrie
- Walter Bassett
- Bill Bradfield
- Ted Brown
- Guillermo Capati
- Branko Celler
- Ross Dunning
- Alan Finkel
- Julie Hammer
- Donald Hector
- Malcolm Kinnaird
- David Knox
- John Moore
- Andrew Parfitt
- Karen Reynolds
- David James Skellern
- Chandreshekar Sonwane
- Alex Zelinsky

== Migration skills assessment ==
Engineers Australia is the designated assessing authority for engineering occupations as listed by the Department of Immigration and Border Protection.

== Governance ==
The National Congress is a representative body of some 35 members, which elects and monitors the Board of Engineers Australia. The responsibilities and structure of National Congress are determined by the Royal Charter and By-laws. The Board is Engineers Australia's governing body. It has six members and its role is comparable to that of a company board. It appoints and liaises with the Chief Executive Officer, sets regulations and policies, sets strategic directions, and monitors the organisation's financial sustainability and performance. Each of Engineers Australia's nine divisions is led by a division committee of the division members. A division committee is responsible to and under the direction of the Board. A division group delivers specific services to the members of the Division, within a specific field of practice, area of interest or geographic area. Each of Engineers Australia's nine colleges is led by a College Board of the college members. College Boards are under the direction of the Board.

The patron of Engineers Australia is the former Governor-General of Australia, David Hurley.

== Regulatory schemes ==
There is no formal system of regulation for engineers throughout Australia. Engineering services are regulated under a variety of Acts in ad hoc areas, many of which relate to engineers in the building and construction industry. There are also many pieces of subordinate legislation, such as regulations, by-laws and orders-in-council that impose various prescriptive standards. In Queensland, persons who are not registered with the Board of Professional Engineers Queensland are prohibited from offering or providing professional engineering services. The only exception is for individuals who practise under the direct supervision of registered professional engineers.

== Registers ==
=== State register ===
Queensland is currently the only Australian jurisdiction to apply a comprehensive registration system for engineers. The Queensland Minister for Public Works and Information and Communication Technology appointed Engineers Australia on 1 July 2008 as one of the Approved Assessment entities for assessing applicants for Registration with the Board of Professional Engineers of Queensland.

=== National register ===
The National Engineering Register (NER) has been created by Engineers Australia to provide a means of presenting registered engineers and their services to the public. It also provides assurance to consumers that engineers engaged from the NER meet the high standards of professionalism expected in the engineering profession. It is the largest Engineering Register in the country delivering a uniform national benchmark standard of professionalism in the broadest areas of engineering practice, both general and special.

The NER is a publicly searchable database providing a national system of ‘registration’ for the engineering profession in Australia of professional engineers, engineering technologists and engineering associates in both the private and public sectors. It is expected that the NER will facilitate access to existing State/Territory registers and to new registers, as and when they are developed. The NER is aimed at removing any current inconsistencies across State/Territory jurisdictions.

The NER caters for nine (9) general and ten (10) special areas of practice aligned to demonstrated professional competence and experience. Registration on the 10 special areas of practice will be restricted to Chartered members of Engineers Australia and registrants who have successfully completed Engineers Australia's Chartered assessment process.

Registrants on the NER will be able to confirm the following eligibility criteria:

- A recognised qualification
- Relevant professional practice
- Currency of continuing professional development (CPD)
- The benefit of Professional Indemnity Insurance (PII)
- A commitment to ethical practice

=== International register ===
Chartered members of Engineers Australia can apply to join the:

- Asia-Pacific Economic Cooperation (APEC) register
- International Professional Engineers Agreement (IPEA) register

The APEC register allows use post-nominals APECEngineer and the IPEA allows the use of the post-nominals IntPE(Aus).

== Continuing professional development ==
The Board expects Chartered Members and Registrants to maintain records of continuing Professional Development (CPD) activities that extend or update their knowledge, skill or judgment in their area or areas of engineering practice. An individual's CPD records must demonstrate a minimum of 150 hours of structured CPD in the last three years. To maintain Chartered Status, registrants must complete Continuing Professional Development (CPD), which is subject to review every five years.

== Code of ethics ==
Since its inception, Engineers Australia has had a Code of Ethics and disciplinary processes that enable it to take action against members who breach that Code. The membership by-laws require the professional regulation of members.

Chartered members and registrants on the various registers are specifically required to practice in accordance with the Code of Ethics.

== Sustainability ==
Engineers Australia believes that sustainable development is development that meets the needs of the present without compromising the ability of future generations to meet their own needs.

== Complaints - professional conduct ==
Engineers Australia has a detailed and regulated process for handling complaints against members and office bearers. Complaints against members of Engineers Australia are handled in accordance with Division 4 of the General Regulations 2016. If the person is not a member, then Engineers Australia has no authority to commence an investigation or take any action regarding the person's professional conduct. Engineers Australia is also not able to offer legal advice in relation to contractual or common law disputes or criminal matters and the complaints process will not result in financial restitution or compensation.

== Position statements ==
One of Engineers Australia's core activities is to make its position known on policies, inquiries and other government initiative. Engineers Australia draws upon the intellectual capital of the membership of Engineers Australia when drafting position statements and developing submissions.

In 2023, the Engineers Australia Transport Australia Society recommended to make cycling safer, and made a recommendation to increase funding for cycling in Australia by at least 5 times.

== Annual report and financials ==
In accordance with By-law 20.2, an Annual Report is presented by the Board each year for the business of the Annual General Meeting of Engineers Australia.

== Lobbying ==
Engineers Australia engages third-party political lobbyists in various jurisdictions. For example, in South Australia, Engineers Australia engages MCM Strategic Communications.

== Publications ==
The Journal of the Institution of Engineers was the house organ from 1929. In 1976 when it was rebranded Engineers Australia.

Create magazine was introduced on 12 August 2015. It was a magazine that showcased the profession, achievements, impacts and future thinking of engineering, but was phased out in 2020-2021 and replaced with an on-line version 'Create Digital' published by Mahlab publishers. EHA Magazine is published quarterly covering industrial and engineering heritage first published in December 2013.

== Engineering heritage recognition program ==
Engineering Heritage Australia, a special interest group within Engineers Australia, runs a program that recognises historically significant engineering works. Such works have a plaque on display, with a brief summary of the significance of the work. The program was established in 1984 with two categories of awards, "National Engineering Landmark" and "Historic Engineering Marker". In 2009 these were renamed "Engineering Heritage National Landmark" and "Engineering Heritage Marker"; in 2011 and 2012 the awards were renamed and a third category added. The current awards are:

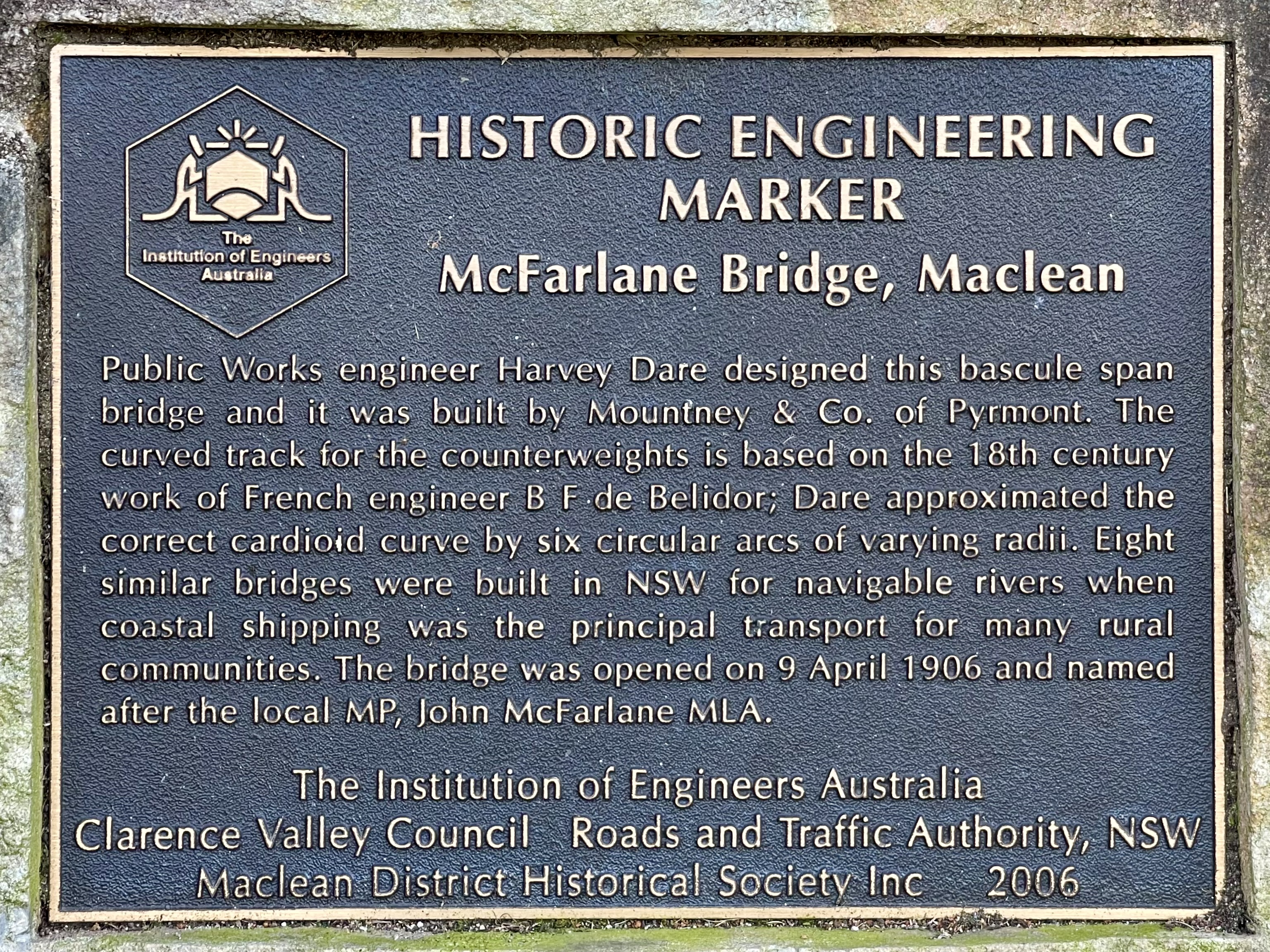
Historic Engineering Marker plaque

- Engineering Heritage Marker
- Engineering Heritage National Marker
- Engineering Heritage International Marker

As of August 2024 there were 256 registered sites. Details of the sites are available from the Engineering Heritage Australia web site.

== Awards ==
Since its formation in 1919, EA have been conferring awards. This role was enshrined in a Royal Charter, granted in 1938. In 1950, the Board created Engineers Australia’s General Prize Fund. Today it is called the Engineers Australia Excellence Awards

The Peter Nicol Russell Memorial Medal is the most prestigious award conferred by Engineers Australia. It is presented each year for notable contribution to the science and/or practice of engineering in Australia.

The Professional Engineer of the Year is the most prestigious national Engineering award given to a practicing engineer for his or her exceptional contributions to Engineering in the evaluated year. Each major city branch of Engineers of Australia first selects the best professional engineers in the city and surroundings and some of these winners are nominated for the national award, and the national winner is selected by a national committee of Engineers Australia.

== Arms ==
Coat of arms of the Institution of Engineers, Australia

Adopted
Granted by the College of Arms, 1983.
Crest
A demi-Pantheon Azure semy of Estoiles Or holding between its forefeet a Scroll Argent
Torse
A Wreath Argent and Azure.
Helm
A closed Helmet, Mantled Azure doubled Argent.
Escutcheon
Azure a Fess enarched Argent in chief a Sun in splendour visaged Gold.
Supporters
On either side a Kangaroo sejant guardant Azure gorged Or and crowned with a Crown composed of Wattle Sprigs Gold.
Motto
Latin: Ingenio Ac Scientia ("Ability and Knowledge")
Symbolism
Supporters: The two kangaroos are symbolic of Australia, and they are gorged (collared) and crowned with Wattle (the national floral emblem) to symbolise the oversight and authority of the Royal Charter granted in 1938. Escutcheon: The silver arch on the shield represents the strength and resilience of structures and machines. The sun is a symbol of the use and conservation of energy. Crest: The Pantheon in the crest is a mythical heraldic creature which was said to live among the stars, and is symbolic of the universality of engineering and its dependence on energy. It holds a scroll to symbolise the Institution's role in education and learning. The Pantheon also appears as supporters in the arms granted to the Engineering Council in the United Kingdom.

== See also ==
- Amalgamated Engineer Union
- Australasian Society of Engineers
