= Kotobuki =

Kotobuki (written: 寿 lit. "long life" or ことぶき in hiragana) a Japanese surname. Notable people with the surname include:

- Hikaru Kotobuki (ことぶき 光, born 1964), Japanese musician
- Minako Kotobuki (寿 美菜子, born 1991), Japanese actress, voice actress and singer
- Tsukasa Kotobuki (ことぶき つかさ), Japanese character designer and manga artist

== Fictional characters ==
- Hiyori Kotobuki (寿 日和), a character in the manga series Recently, My Sister Is Unusual
- Minami Kotobuki (寿 みなみ), a character in manga and anime series Oshi no Ko
- Shiiko "C-ko" Kotobuki (寿 詩子), a character in the anime series Project A-ko
- Tsumugi "Mugi" Kotobuki (琴吹 紬), a character in the anime/manga series K-On!

== See also ==
- Kotobuki (folklore), a yōkai in Japanese mythology
- Kotobuki Shiriagari (しりあがり 寿, born 1958), Japanese manga artist and actor
- Kotobuki Station, a railway station in Yamanashi, Japan
- Kotobuki System Co., Ltd., better known as Kemco
- Nakajima Kotobuki, an aircraft engine
- The Magnificent Kotobuki, an anime television series
- Shouka (mountain pass), a mountain pass in southern Taiwan formerly known as Kotobuki Pass
