= Guillermo Capati =

Adjunct Professor

Guillermo Capati PSM
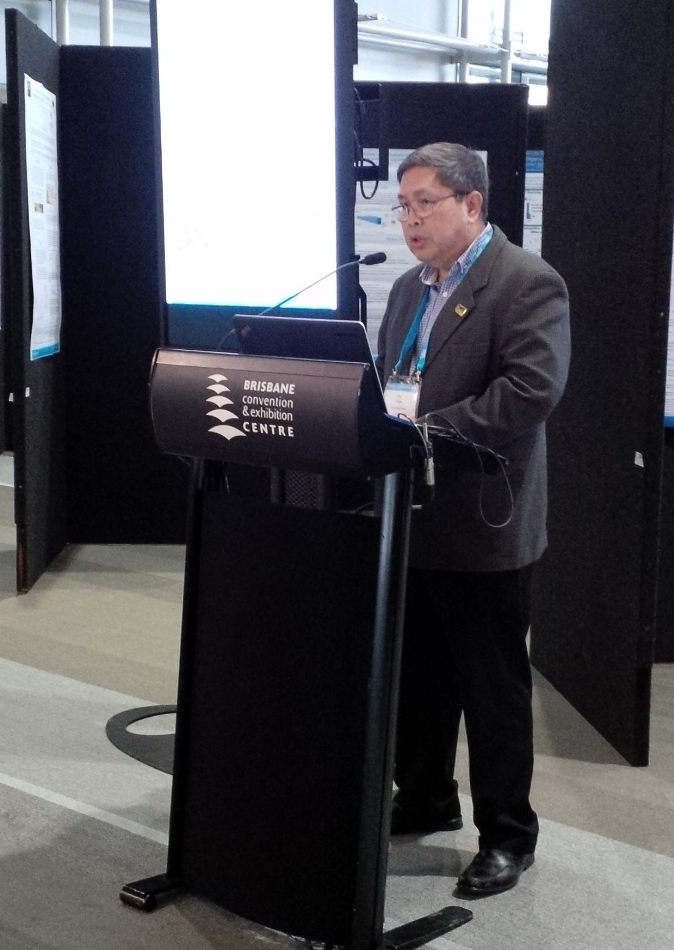
- Born: Solana, Cagayan, Philippines
- Citizenship: Australian
- Education: Mapúa University, University of the Philippines Diliman, University of Southern Queensland
- Occupations: Civil Engineer; Environmental Engineer
- Spouse: Minerva Capati

Guillermo "Bill" Capati, is an Australian engineer. He is an adjunct professor and professional engineer in the field of civil and environmental engineering. Capati is an adjunct professor at the University of Queensland since December 2008.

Capati was awarded the University of Southern Queensland Outstanding Alumni of the Year in 2020. In 2017, he was named Australia Queensland Professional Engineer of the Year. In 2013, Capati was awarded a Public Service Medal (PSM) by the Governor-General of Australia for his contribution to the water future of the Gold Coast and the border South East Queensland.

The Philippine President, Rodrigo Duterte conferred the "Pamana ng Pilipino" award to him in 2016. This award is given to Filipinos living overseas, who have brought their country honor and recognition through excellence and distinction in pursuit of their work or profession.

Capati has worked at the University Queensland Centre for Water and Environmental Biotechnology, formerly the Advanced Water Management Centre. In 2020, Capati was conferred a University Queensland (UQ) Fellowship by Chancellor Peter Varghese AO at a special ceremony held on 14 November 2020 in Brisbane.

In 2023, Capati was a recipient of the Lord Mayor's Australia Day Achievement Awards for community service at the ceremony held at Brisbane City Hall.

== Education ==
Capati completed his secondary education at Saint Louis School of Tuguegarao and graduated in the year 1968. Capati graduated with a Bachelor of Science Degree in Civil Engineering in 1973 and Sanitary Engineering 1974 from Mapúa University, Philippines. Capati completed his Master of Architecture degree in 1982 from the University of the Philippines Diliman. In 1991, Capati completed his Graduate Diploma in Municipal Engineering degree from the University of Southern Queensland.

== Notable works ==
Capati worked at the City of Gold Coast from 1994 to 2017, where he managed the city's water and wastewater needs and was responsible for the city's long-term water planning and recycled water release. Capati was involved with the following notable projects:

- Pimpama Coomera Waterfuture Master Plan - International Water Association (IWA) Project Innovation Awards (PIA) winner in the Planning Category. Awarded at the 2006 IWA World Water Congress held in Beijing, China. In 2007, the Pimpama Coomera Waterfuture Master Plan was awarded the United Nations Association of Australia (UNAA) World Environment Day Awards in the category of Excellence in Water Management.
- Gold Coast Water's Four R's Project - From Vision to Reality. International Water Association (IWA) Project Innovation Awards (PIA) winner in the Planning Category which was presented at the 2010 IWA World Water Congress held in Montreal, Canada.
- Gold Coast Waterfuture Strategy - The project was honored with the Australian Water Association (AWA) Water Environment Merit Award, which was presented at the 2009 Ozwater Conference held in Melbourne, Australia.
- The Broadwater Assimilative Capacity Study and Gold Coast Seaway SmartRelease project provided a new benchmark for the sustainable operation and optimization of ebb-staged recycled water release systems.
- In 2003, while with the City of Gold Coast, Capati initiated discussions on the Model Based Management for Hydrogen Sulfide in Sewers and Sewer Corrosion and Odor Research (SCORe) Project with University of Queensland- Advanced Water Management Center.
- Model Based Management for Hydrogen Sulfide in Sewers - International Water Association (IWA) Project Innovation Awards (PIA) winner for East Asia & Pacific Region in the Applied Research Category which was awarded during the 2008 Singapore International Water Week.
- Sewer Corrosion and Odor Research (SCORe) Project - International Water Association (IWA) Project Innovation Awards (PIA) winner in the Applied Research Category which was presented at the 2014 IWA World Water Congress held in Lisbon, Portugal.
- In 2009, Gold Coast City Mayor Ron Clarke MBE, presented Capati with a Certificate of Appreciation for exemplary leadership and vision for contributing towards the Gold Coast Water being named as the Public Water Agency of the Year at the Global Water Intelligence 2009 Awards held in Zurich, Switzerland.

== Major honors and awards ==
- 2024 Local Heroes Community Service Award for Tennyson Ward.
- 2023 Brisbane Lord Mayor Australia Day Achievement Award.
- 2020 Conferred the University of Queensland Fellowship (Honorary Award) in recognition of service to the university.
- 2020 Honored as the University of Southern Queensland Outstanding Alumni of the Year.
- 2017 Named as the Engineers Australia Queensland Professional Engineer of the Year.
- 2016 Honored with the "Pamana Ng Pilipino" award from President Rodrigo Duterte of the Philippines.
- 2016 Conferred IWA Fellow by the International Water Association.
- 2015 Named as The Outstanding Mapúan in the Professional Field of Civil Engineering.
- 2013 Awarded a Public Service Medal by the Governor-General of Australia for his contribution to the water future of the Gold Coast and broader South East Queensland.
- 2011 Elected Fellow of Engineers Australia in the Environmental College.
- 2010 Awarded as the Category 3 Fostering Participation in Policy-making Decisions through Innovative Mechanisms (2nd-place winner) at the United Nations Public Service Awards in Barcelona, Spain.
- 2010 Received The Sustainable Engineering Society Eric Brier Memorial Award (Engineers Australia Queensland Division).
- 2010 Elected Fellow of Engineers Australia in the Civil College.
- 2009 Honored with the IPAA Queensland Public Sector Professional of the Year Award.

== Personal life ==
Capati is married to Minerva Capati and have three children, Maria, Gian and Guia-Anna.
