= Alphyn =

Rare heraldic creature

A heraldic alphyn

The alphyn is a rare heraldic creature. It is much like a heraldic tyger, but stockier and with tufts of hair covering its body, and also has a thick mane, long ears and a long thin tongue. Another notable characteristic is its knotted tail, reminiscent of Celtic design and similar to that of the griffin. Sometimes it is depicted as having an eagle's or dragon's talons on its forelegs, other times they are cloven, like a goat's. Occasionally all four feet are depicted as having the claws of a lion. In English heraldry, the alphyn was used as a heraldic badge of the Lords de la Warr, and also appeared on the guidon held by the knight in the Milleflour Tapestry in Somerset.

The word alphyn has been previously identified with the Middle English word alfin, which refers to the bishop in chess and ultimately comes from the Arabic الْفِيل al-fīl, meaning "the elephant," as the bishop was formerly represented by an elephant-shaped piece. However, Williams (1989) argues that the alphyn does not at all resemble an elephant, and elephants themselves are not uncommon in heraldry. Williams instead suggests that as a hybrid animal, the alphyn is related to the heraldic enfield and ultimately sourced from the mythical Irish onchú.

== See also ==
- Attitude (heraldry)
- Charge (heraldry)
- History of England
