= John B. Moore (engineer) =

Australian engineer

John Barratt Moore (1941–2013) was an Australian engineer specialising in signal processing and control systems.

Moore completed his undergraduate and Masters studies in engineering at the University of Queensland in 1962 and 1963 respectively; he then went on to work for Fairchild Semiconductor and received his PhD in electrical engineering from the University of Santa Clara in 1966. He returned to Australia and took an academic position at the University of Newcastle; he moved to the Department of Information Engineering at the Australian National University in 1982. Moore has published over 200 papers and 6 books, his work has been applied commercially in numerous application including the polynomial solving routine he developed which has been used in IBM software since 1996.

In 1979, Moore was elevated to the grade of IEEE fellow for contributions to optimal estimation and control and leadership in electrical engineering education.

In 2001 he received the Centenary Medal "For service to Australian society and science in systems engineering", and in 1994 was elected a Fellow of the Australian Academy of Science.
