= Meduza (Russian folklore) =

Mythical creature in Russian folklore

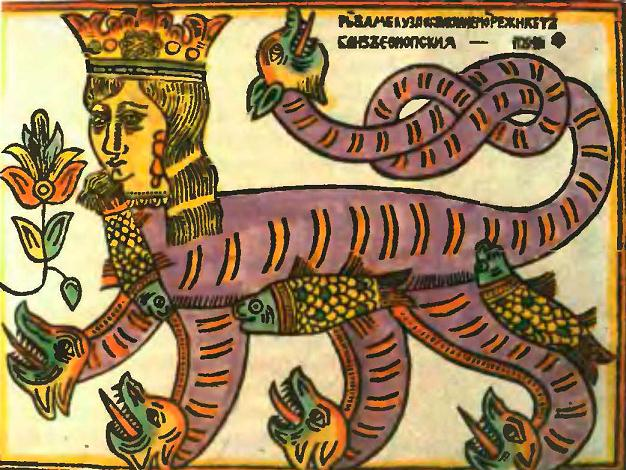
Meduza. Russian lubok. 17th–18th century.

Meduza (Russian: Медуза), Meluza (Russian: Мелуза, literally "small", "little") or Meluzina (Russian: Мелузина) is a mythical creature in Russian folklore. She was depicted in a Russian lubok of the 17th or 18th century. She is described as half-woman, half-snake, or as the half-woman, half-fish creature. She is also said to be the deity of deception.

== Appearance ==
She is represented as a sea monster with the head of a beautiful dark-haired maiden, having the body and belly of a striped beast, a dragon tail with a snake's mouth at the end, and legs resembling those of an elephant with the same snake mouths at the end. She also wears a crown.

According to belief, her snake mouths contained a deadly dragon poison. She was said to live in the Sea near the Ethiopian abyss, or in the Western Ocean.

== See also ==
- Medusa
- Melusine
