= Tlanchana =

Figure in Matlatzincan mythology

The Tlanchana, also known as the Anchane, is a freshwater figure of the Matlatzinca people.

== Description ==
Her appearance is that of a woman with the lower body of a snake, and is oftentimes wearing a crown, necklaces, and aquatic creatures strung around her waist. Due to European influence, later depictions portray her as a mermaid with a fish tail in the place of a serpent's. The Tlanchana originates from an Otomi goddess known as Acapaxapo (also spelled Acpaxapo). She was said to have divinatory powers and would be called upon to deliver omens. The Aztecs later adopted the goddess under the name Atl-tonan-chane, or Altonanchane, which became Tlanchana. Unlike the Acapaxapo, the Tlanchana was not purely benevolent. If rejected, she would wrap around human men and drag them underwater to drown.
