= Draconcopedes =

Creature in medieval zoology

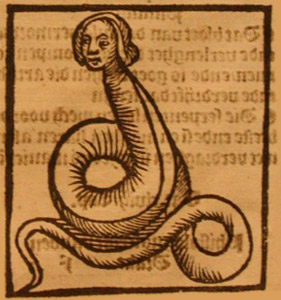
Image of Draconcopede by Vincent of Beauvais in his Speculum Naturale

The medieval Latin term draconcopedes refers to a beast mentioned in some medieval zoologies.

Vincent of Beauvais (c. 1190–1264) describes this beast as a vast serpentine creature with the head, face and breasts of a woman. In the Speculum naturale, he states: Draconcopedes serpentes magni sunt, et potentes, facies virgineas habentes humanis similes, in draconum corpus desinentes ("Draconcopedes are great and powerful serpents, with maidenly faces like those of humans, ending in the body of a dragon").

Albertus Magnus (c. 1200–1280) states in his On Animals:

The draconcopedes are what the Greeks call a large serpent of the third class and of the dragon genus which, they say, has the maidenly face of an unbearded man.

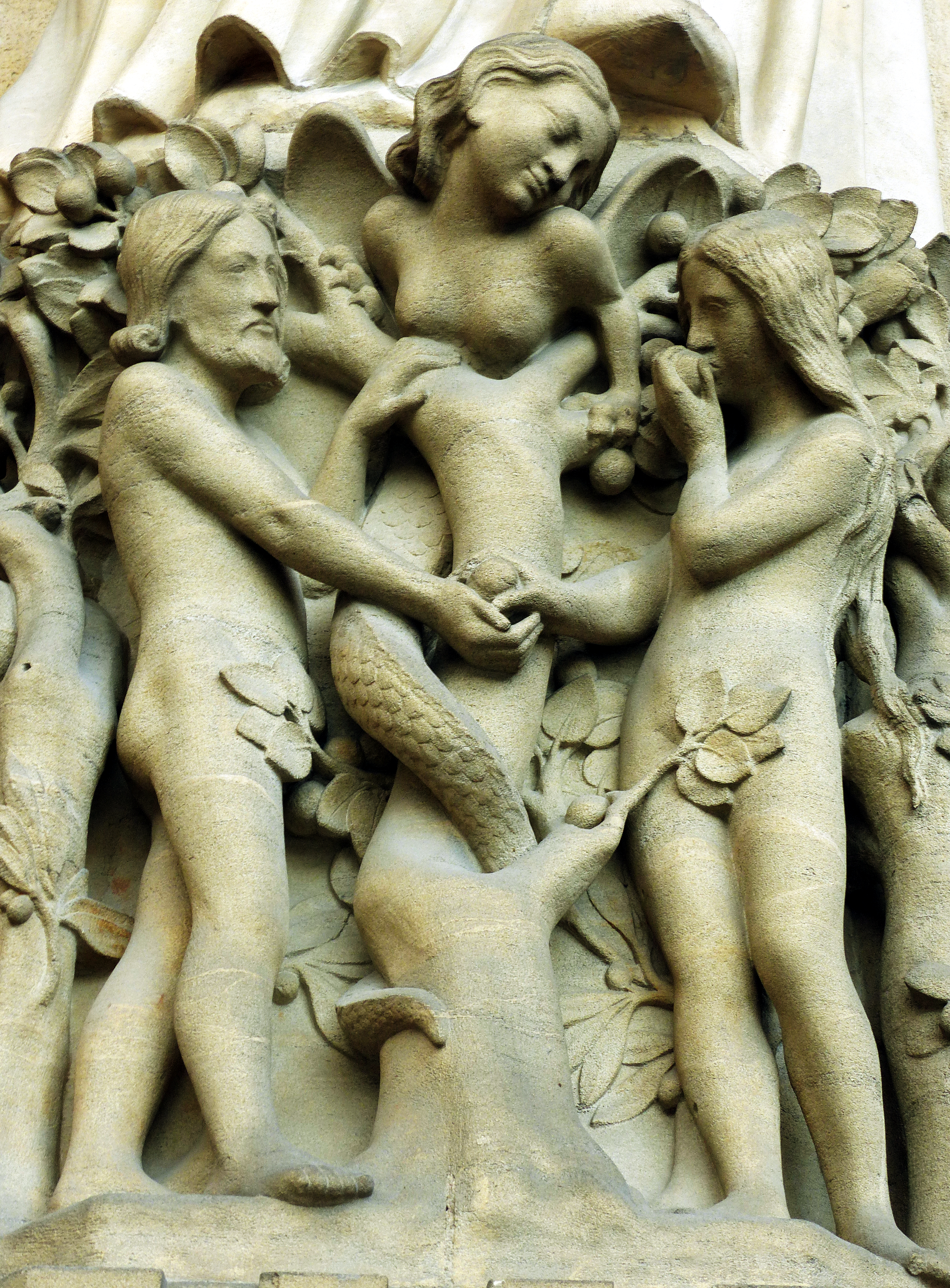
Serpent portrayed as Lilith, with human upper torso. Cathedral of Notre Dame, Paris.

Charles Dickens, in his Household Words, Volume 12, 1855, cites Bede in describing the draconcopedes as "the serpent with a women's head which tempted Eve."
