= Ypotryll =

Medieval European chimeric creature featured in heraldry

Appearance of the "Yppotrill"

The Ypotryll is a Medieval European chimeric creature featured in heraldry. It has the tusked head of a wild boar or hog, the humped body of a camel, the legs and hooves of an ox or goat and the long, scaly tail of a serpent. Its name is thought to be derived from the Greek hippo (horse), or in Middle English ypotame, itself derived from the Latin ypotamus. Little is known of the creature's meanings or origins, but it appears as the badge of John Tiptoft, 1st Earl of Worcester, also known as the "Butcher of England"; a man known for his extreme cruelty in regards to the execution of Lancastrians during his rule as Lord High Constable in the early 1460s. Tiptoft was beheaded in 1470 by the Lancastrians during the War of the Roses (1455–1487).
