= Pantheon (mythical creature) =

Mythical creature

Coat of arms of the United Kingdom Atomic Energy Authority, with two pantheons as supporters

The pantheon is a mythical or imaginary creature used in heraldry, particularly in Britain. They are often depicted as deer with the tail of a fox and spangeled with stars along their back.

It appears to have been first adopted in English coats of arms in the early Tudor period, subsequently becoming part of the design repertoire of the heralds in their official grants of arms. Early sightings of the creature include the pantheon crests of the Gloucestershire knight Sir Christopher Baynham (knighted 1513) and his Cornish contemporary John Skewys. Two pantheons appear from the 1530s as the supporters of the arms of the Paulet or Powlett Marquesses of Winchester, though at a later date they were reinterpreted as the hinds or female deer they can closely resemble. In 1556 a coat of arms with three pantheons on the shield was granted to Henry Northey of Bocking in Essex.

The pantheon is usually represented as a cervid similar to a hind (a female red deer), usually black or dark blue in colour, although sometimes red, its hide patterned with regularly spaced stars or estoiles. However, the historian of heraldry Hugh Stanford London suggested that the creature originated as a misreading or misunderstanding of the panther (itself represented in exotic fashion in heraldry and medieval art, often shown with stars on its body and sometimes even with cloven hooves).

Pantheons became popular again in the twentieth century, particularly as a symbol of air or space travel or other advanced forms of technology. Examples are the arms of the United Kingdom Atomic Energy Authority, granted in 1955; two pantheons also appear as the supporters of the arms of the Engineering Council (the United Kingdom regulatory body for the engineering profession), granted in 1984. The arms of the Canadian Space Agency has a pantheon in the crest.
