= Tyger (heraldry) =

Heraldic animal

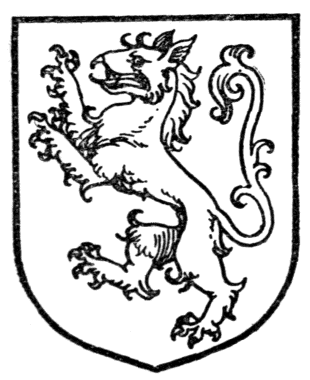
A tyger, from The Complete Guide to Heraldry

Tyger, also known as heraldic tiger or tygre, is an imaginary beast used as a charge in heraldry.

== Name ==
To distinguish it from the naturally existing tiger, which also occurs in heraldry, the older form is traditionally referred to as the heraldic tiger, tyger, or tigre, while the latter is usually blazoned as a Bengal tiger.

== Description ==
The tyger's body is like that of the real tiger, but lacks stripes. Its head does not closely resemble any real animal except perhaps a more massive wolf, and typically has prominent canines and a short curved horn or spike on its snout occasionally the tyger is depicted with tusks instead . It has a thick mane or series of tufts of hair along its neck like a horse, and similar tufts are on its breast and thighs. It has the tufted tail of a lion. A tyger proper was in medieval times said to be speckled.

== History ==
As real tigers were unknown to early British heraldists, depictions of this creature were drawn from artists' ideas of this creature that they knew only through secondhand accounts. Consequently, although it originated as an attempt to depict a real creature, the heraldic tyger eventually became highly distinct from the original animal. Real tigers began to appear in British heraldry, although only sporadically, in the eighteenth century as a result of the colonization of India within the British Empire.

== Mythology ==
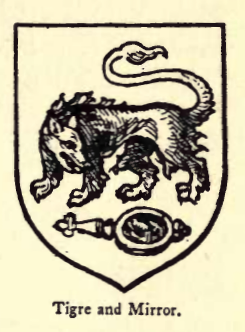
tygre looking in mirror

The tyger was said to have its home in Armenia. Its swiftness was supposed to have given its name to "tygris", the Persian word for "arrow", and to the swift River Tigris.

If pursued by a tyger, it was supposed to be possible to get away from it by leaving a mirror, which would perplex the tyger, or entrance it in admiration of its own beauty. A variant of this account claimed this to be a method used by hunters when taking a tygress' cubs, who would scatter mirrors behind themselves so that the creature will cease her pursuit either to admire her own beauty or because she mistakes her reflection for one of her cubs. As a result, tygers are sometimes depicted looking in a mirror, although this particular device is overall uncommon.

== Use ==
Two passant tygers on the coat of arms of Daniel Horsmanden

Tyger head on the coat of arms of Stephen Decatur

Rampant tyger on the coat of arms of Ashbel Smith

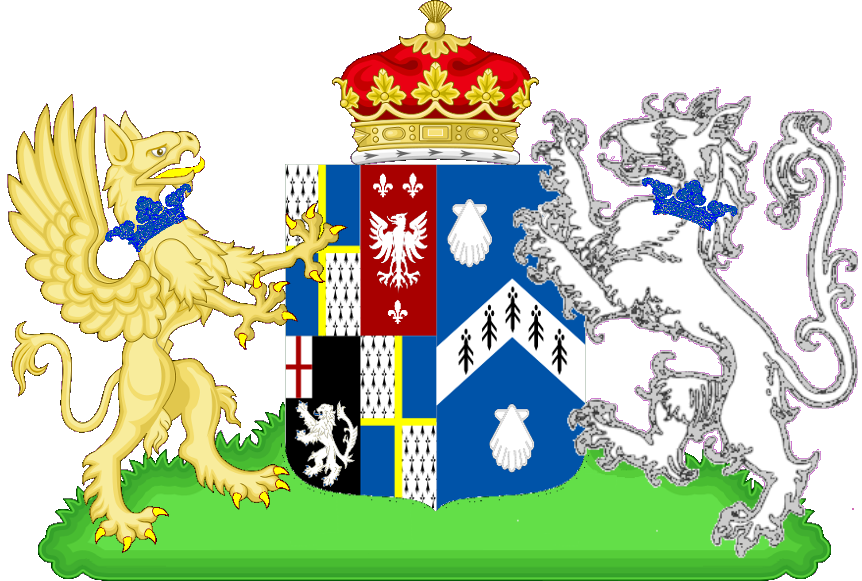
Tyger as one of two supporters on the achievement of Charlotte Duchess of Leads

Tyger as one supporter on the coat of arms of the London Borough of Hillingdon

A tyger and llama on the proposed crest of the United Kingdom of the River Plate

Two tygers as supports on the agnew of lochnaw coat of arms

== See also ==
- The Tyger
