= Kotobuki (folklore) =

Japanese mythological creature

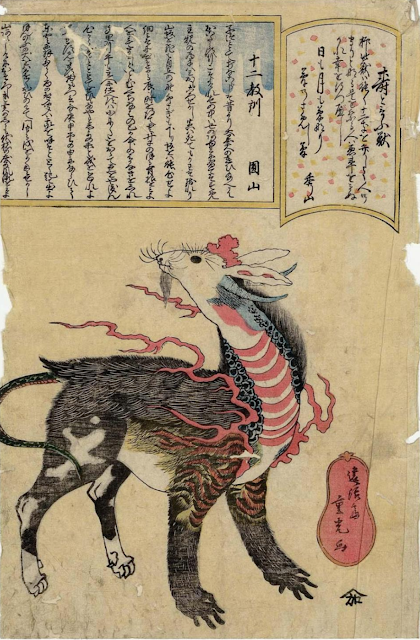
An old 1850 Japanese painting describing the Kotobuki.

Kotobuki (寿; "congratulations") is a yōkai in Japanese mythology. The Kotobuki is a Japanese Chimera that has the parts of the creatures of the animals on the Chinese zodiac where it sports the head of a rat, the ears of a rabbit, the horns of an ox, the comb of a rooster, the beard of a goat, the neck of a dragon, the mane of a horse, the shoulders of a tiger, the arms of a monkey, the back of a boar, the hind legs of a dog, and the tail of a snake.

== See also ==
- Nue, a related Japanese chimera
