= Sydney =

Capital city of New South Wales, Australia

- City
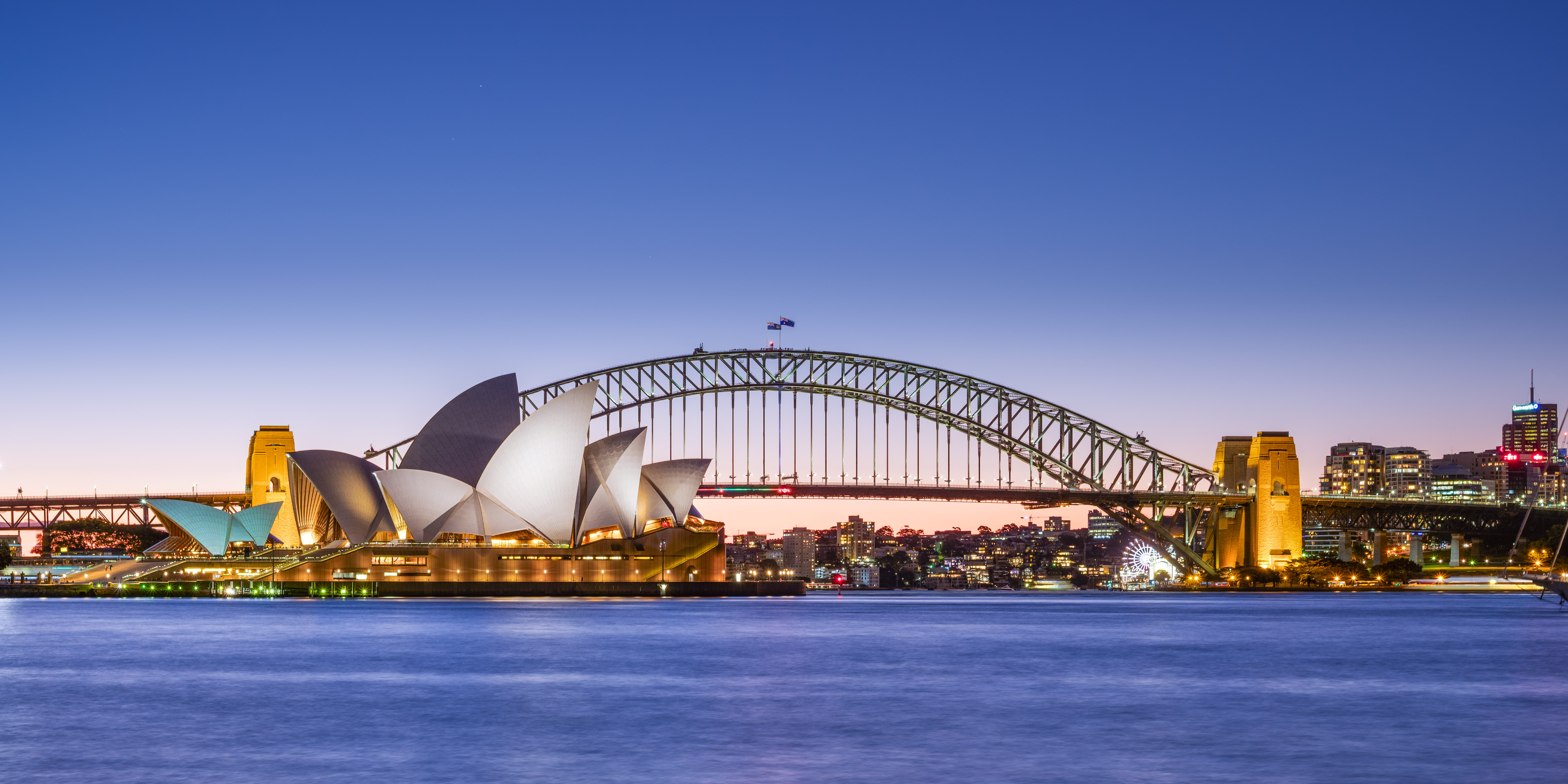
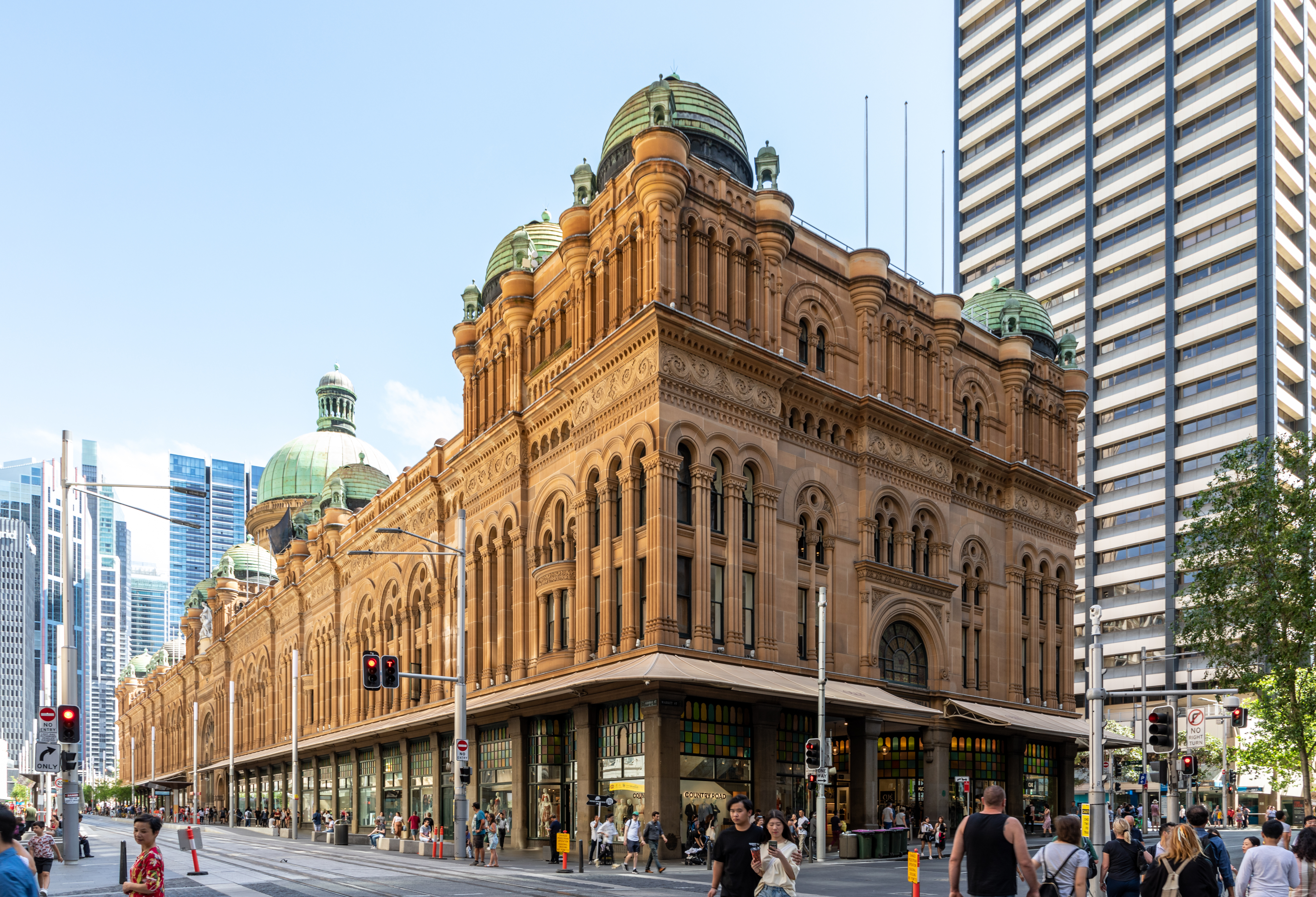
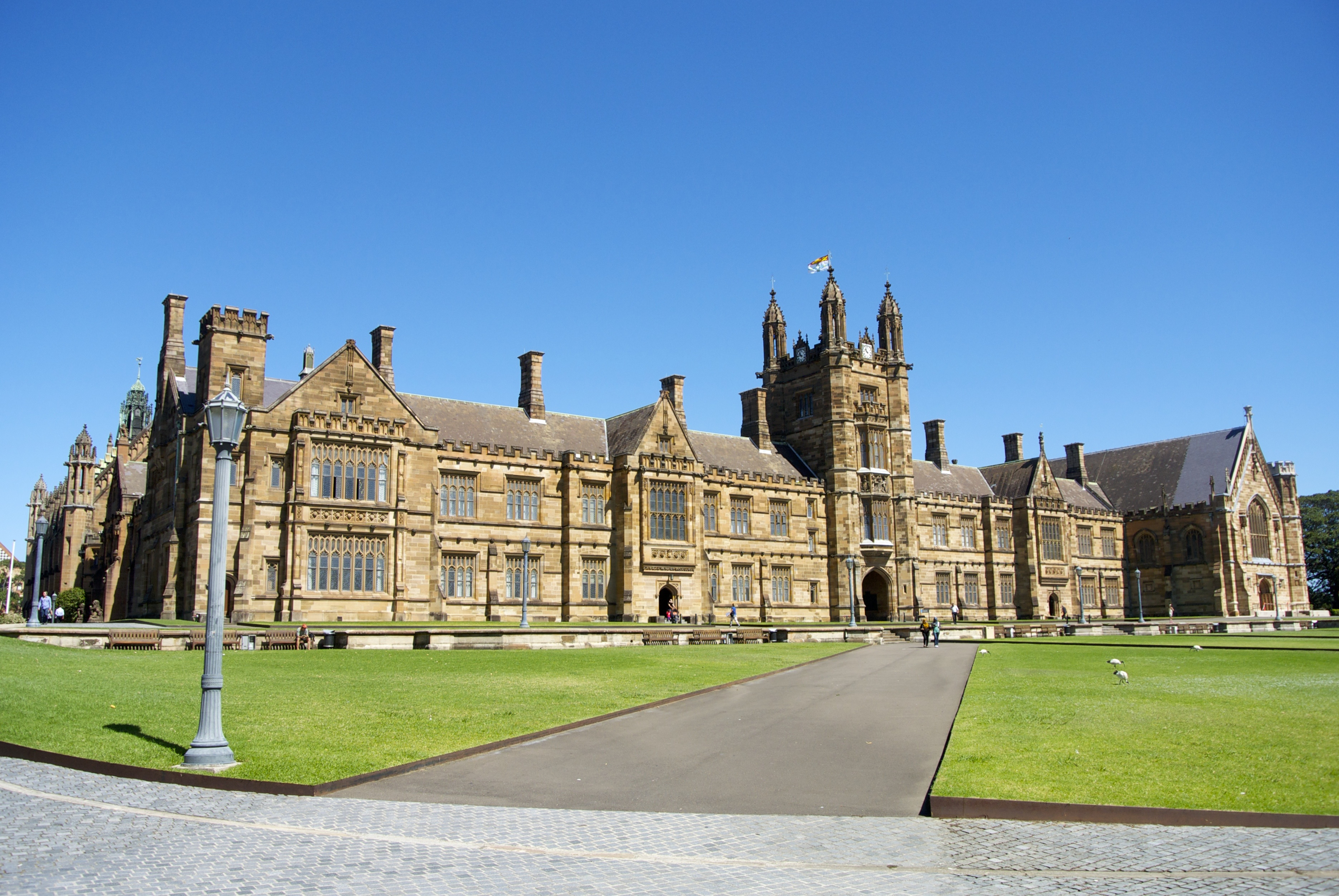
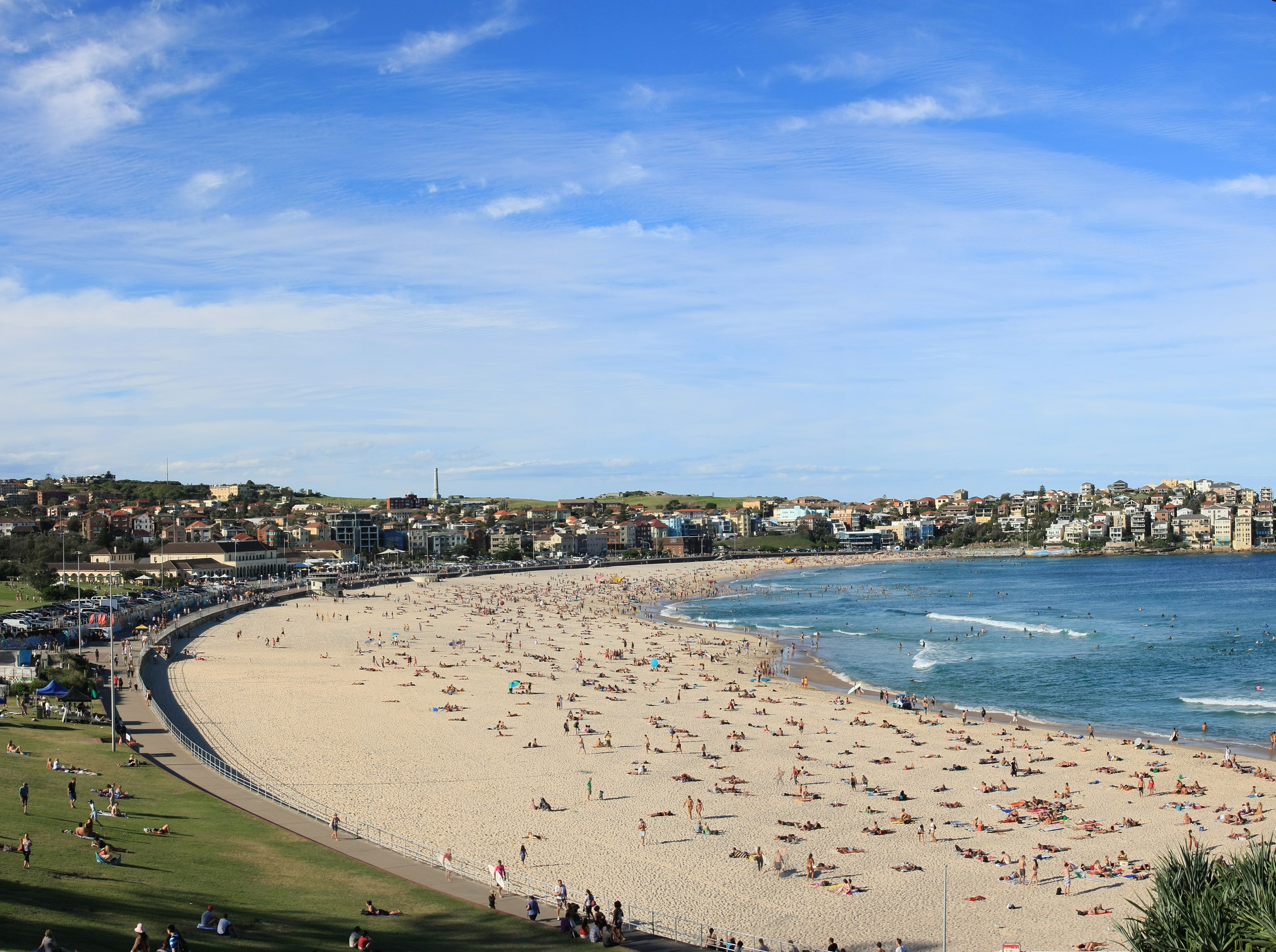
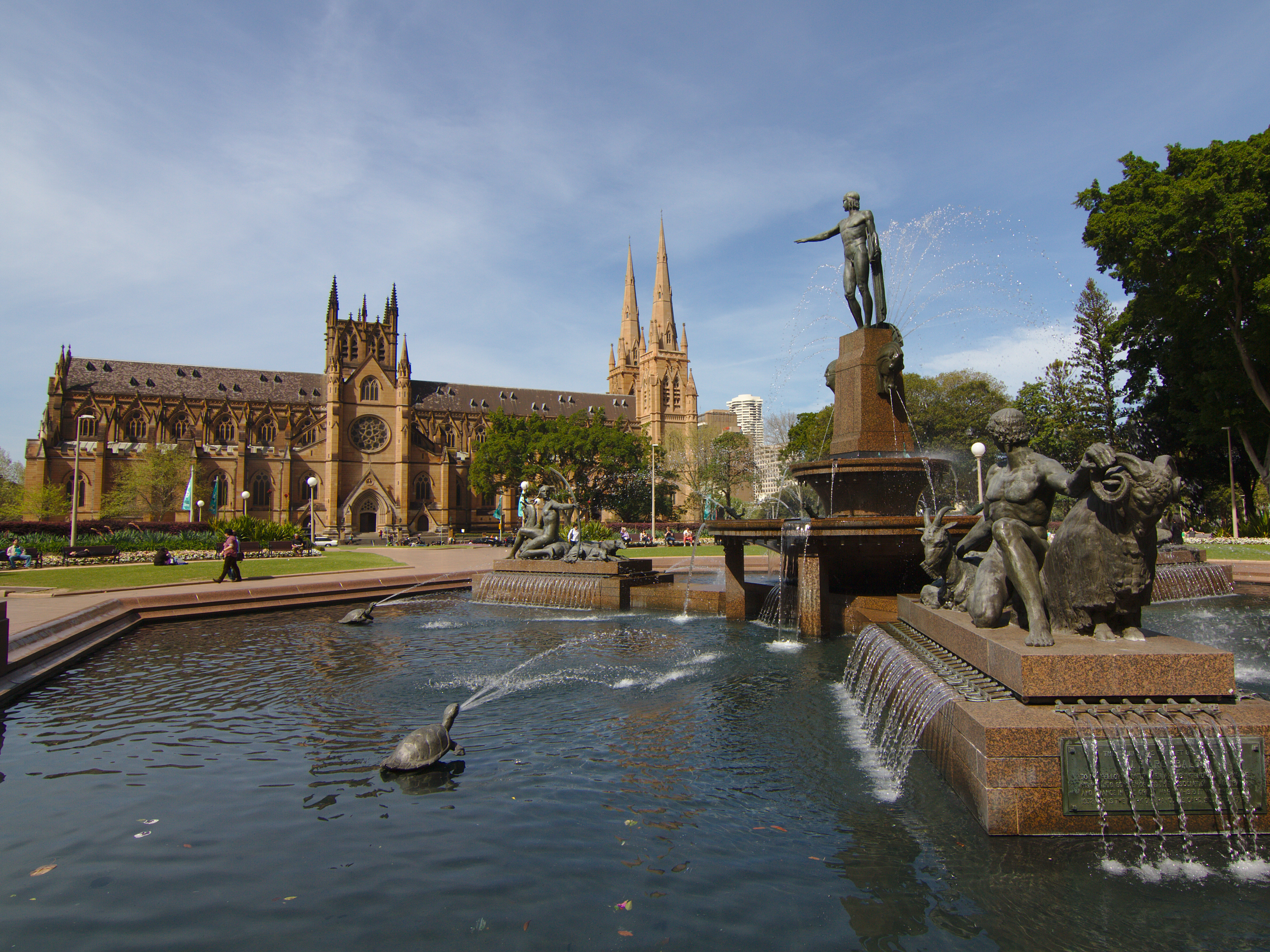
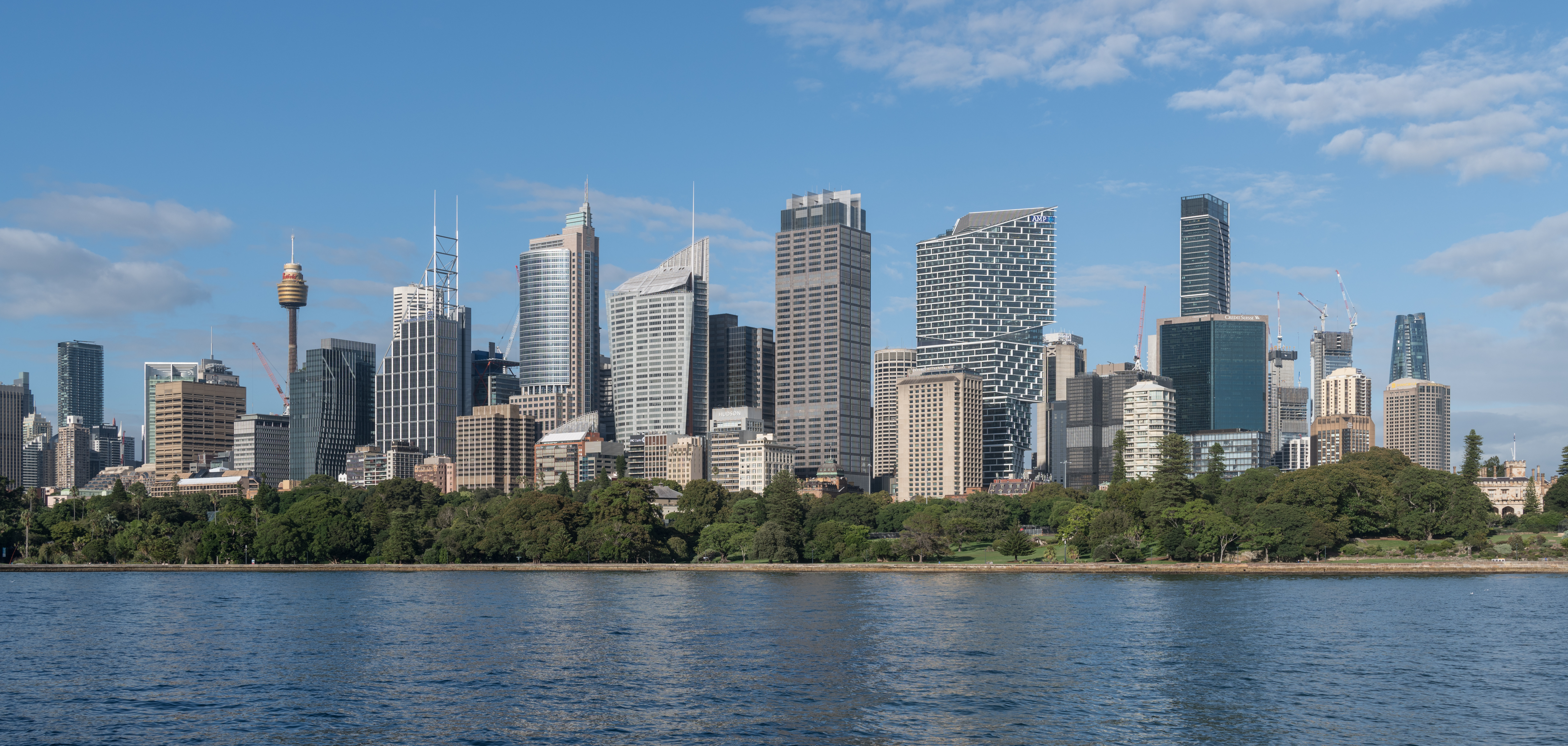
- Sydney Opera House and Harbour Bridge Queen Victoria Building University of Sydney Bondi Beach Archibald Fountain and St Mary's Cathedral Sydney central business district

- Interactive map of Sydney
- Coordinates: 33°52′4″S 151°12′36″E
- Country: Australia
- State: New South Wales
- LGA: 33 municipalities across Greater Sydney
- First Peoples: Eora; Dharug, Dharawal
- Location: 285 km (177 mi) NE of Canberra; 877 km (545 mi) NE of Melbourne; 973 km (605 mi) S of Brisbane; 1,373 km (853 mi) E of Adelaide; 3,845 km (2,389 mi) E of Perth
- Established: 26 January 1788; 238 years ago

Government
  - State electorate: 49 electoral districts
  - Federal division: 24 divisions

Area (GCCSA)
  - Total: 12,367.7 km^{2} (4,775.2 sq mi)

Population
  - Total: 5,638,830 (2025) (1st)
  - Density: 449.3/km^{2} (1,164/sq mi)(2023)
- Time zone: UTC+10 (AEST)
  - Summer (DST): UTC+11 (AEDT)
- County: Cumberland
- Mean max temp: 22.8 °C (73.0 °F)
- Mean min temp: 14.7 °C (58.5 °F)
- Annual rainfall: 1,149.7 mm (45.26 in)

Sydney (Note: /ˈsɪdni/ SID-nee) is the capital of the state of New South Wales and the largest city in Australia. The urban area surrounds Sydney Harbour and extends about 60 kilometres (37 mi) from the Pacific Ocean in the east to the escarpment of the Blue Mountains in the west, and at a maximum about 80 kilometres (50 mi) from Palm Beach in the north-east, to Camden in the south-west. Greater Sydney consists of 658 suburbs, spread across 33 local government areas. Residents of the city are colloquially known as "Sydneysiders". The estimated population in June 2025 was 5,638,830, which is about 66% of the state's population. The city's nicknames include the Emerald City and the Harbour City.

There is evidence that Aboriginal Australians inhabited the Greater Sydney region at least 30,000 years ago, and their engravings and cultural sites are common. The traditional custodians of the land on which modern Sydney stands are the clans of the Darug, Dharawal and Eora. During his first Pacific voyage in 1770, James Cook charted the eastern coast of Australia, making landfall at Botany Bay. In 1788, the First Fleet of convicts, led by Arthur Phillip, founded Sydney as a British penal colony, the first European settlement in Australia. After World War II, Sydney experienced mass migration and by 2021 over 40 per cent of the population was born overseas. Foreign countries of birth with the greatest representation are mainland China, India, the United Kingdom, Vietnam and the Philippines.

Despite being one of the most expensive cities in the world, Sydney frequently ranks in the top ten most liveable cities. It is classified as an Alpha+ city by the Globalization and World Cities Research Network, indicating its influence in the region and throughout the world. Ranked eleventh in the world for economic opportunity, Sydney has an advanced market economy with strengths in education, finance, manufacturing and tourism. The University of Sydney and the University of New South Wales are ranked 18th and 19th in the world respectively.

Sydney has hosted major international sporting events such as the 2000 Summer Olympics, the 2003 Rugby World Cup Final, and the 2023 FIFA Women's World Cup Final. The city is among the top fifteen most-visited cities worldwide, with millions of tourists coming each year to see the city's landmarks. The city has over 1,000,000 hectares (2,500,000 acres) of nature reserves and parks, and its notable natural features include Sydney Harbour and Royal National Park. The Sydney Harbour Bridge and the World Heritage-listed Sydney Opera House are major tourist attractions. Central Station is the hub of Sydney's suburban train, metro and light rail networks and longer-distance services. The main passenger airport serving the city is Kingsford Smith Airport, one of the world's oldest continually operating airports.

== Toponymy ==
In 1788, Captain Arthur Phillip, the first governor of New South Wales, named the cove where the first British settlement was established Sydney Cove after Home Secretary Thomas Townshend, 1st Viscount Sydney. The cove was called Warrane by the Aboriginal inhabitants. Phillip considered naming the settlement Albion, but this name was never officially used. By 1790 Phillip and other officials were regularly calling the township "Sydney". Sydney was declared a city in 1842.

The Gadigal (Cadigal) clan, whose territory stretches along the southern shore of Port Jackson from South Head to Darling Harbour, are the traditional owners of the land on which the British settlement was initially established, and call their territory Gadi (Cadi). Aboriginal clan names within the Sydney region were often formed by adding the suffix "-gal" to a word denoting the name for their territory, a specific place in their territory, a food source, or totem. Greater Sydney covers the traditional lands of 28 known Aboriginal clans.

== History ==
=== First inhabitants of the region ===
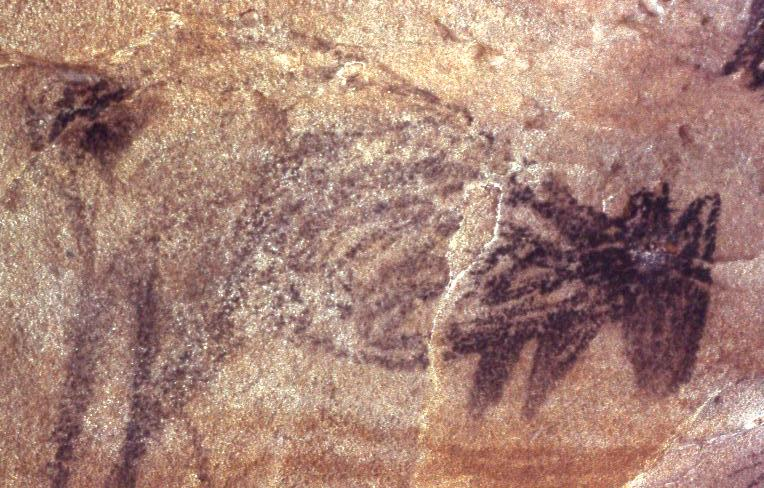
Charcoal drawing of kangaroos in Heathcote National Park

The first people to inhabit the area now known as Sydney were Aboriginal Australians who had migrated from southeast Asia via northern Australia. Flaked pebbles found in Western Sydney's gravel sediments might indicate human occupation from 45,000 to 50,000 years ago, while radiocarbon dating has shown evidence of human activity in the region from around 30,000 years ago. Prior to the arrival of the British, there were 4,000 to 8,000 Aboriginal people in the greater Sydney region.

The inhabitants subsisted on fishing, hunting, and gathering plants and shellfish. The diet of the coastal clans was more reliant on seafood whereas hinterland clans ate more forest animals and plants. The clans had distinctive equipment and weapons mostly made of stone, wood, plant materials, bone and shell. They also differed in their body decorations, hairstyles, songs and dances. Aboriginal clans had a rich ceremonial life, part of a belief system centring on ancestral, totemic and supernatural beings. People from different clans and language groups came together to participate in initiation and other ceremonies. These occasions fostered trade, marriages and clan alliances.

The earliest British settlers recorded the word 'Eora' as an Aboriginal term meaning either 'people' or 'from this place'. The clans of the Sydney area occupied land with traditional boundaries. There is debate, however, about which group or nation these clans belonged to, and the extent of differences in language and rites. The major groups were the coastal Eora people, the Dharug (Darug) occupying the inland area from Parramatta to the Blue Mountains, and the Dharawal people south of Botany Bay. Darginung and Gundungurra languages were spoken on the fringes of the Sydney area.

Aboriginal clans of Sydney area, as recorded by early British settlers
Clan	Territory name	Location
Bediagal	Not recorded	Probably north-west of Parramatta
Birrabirragal	Birrabirra	Lower Sydney Harbour around Sow and Pigs reef
Boolbainora	Boolbainmatta	Parramatta area
Borogegal	Booragy	Probably Bradleys Head and surrounding area
Boromedegal	Not recorded	Parramatta
Buruberongal	Not recorded	North-west of Parramatta
Darramurragal	Not recorded	Turramarra area
Gadigal	Cadi (Gadi)	South side of Port Jackson, from South Head to Darling Harbour
Gahbrogal	Not recorded	Liverpool and Cabramatta area
Gamaragal	Cammeray	North shore of Port Jackson
Gameygal	Kamay	Botany Bay
Gannemegal	Warmul	Parramatta area
Garigal	Not recorded	Broken Bay area
Gayamaygal	Kayeemy	Manly Cove
Gweagal	Gwea	Southern shore of Botany Bay
Wallumedegal	Wallumede	North shore of Port Jackson, opposite Sydney Cove
Wangal	Wann	South side of Port Jackson, from Darling Harbour to Rose Hill
Clans of the Sydney region whose territory wasn't reliably recorded are: the Domaragal, Doogagal, Gannalgal, Gomerigal, Gooneeowlgal, Goorunggurregal, Gorualgal, Murrooredial, Noronggerragal, Oryangsoora and Wandeandegal.
Note: The names and territory boundaries do not always correspond with those used by contemporary Aboriginal groups of the greater Sydney area. (Note: British settlers each used different spellings for Indigenous words. The clan names in this list use Troy's (2019) orthography.)

The first meeting between Aboriginals and British explorers occurred on 29 April 1770 when Lieutenant James Cook landed at Botany Bay (Kamay) and encountered the Gweagal clan. Two Gweagal men opposed the landing party and one was shot and wounded. Cook and his crew stayed at Botany Bay for a week, collecting water, timber, fodder and botanical specimens and exploring the surrounding area. Cook sought to establish relations with the Aboriginal population without success.

=== Convict town (1788–1840) ===
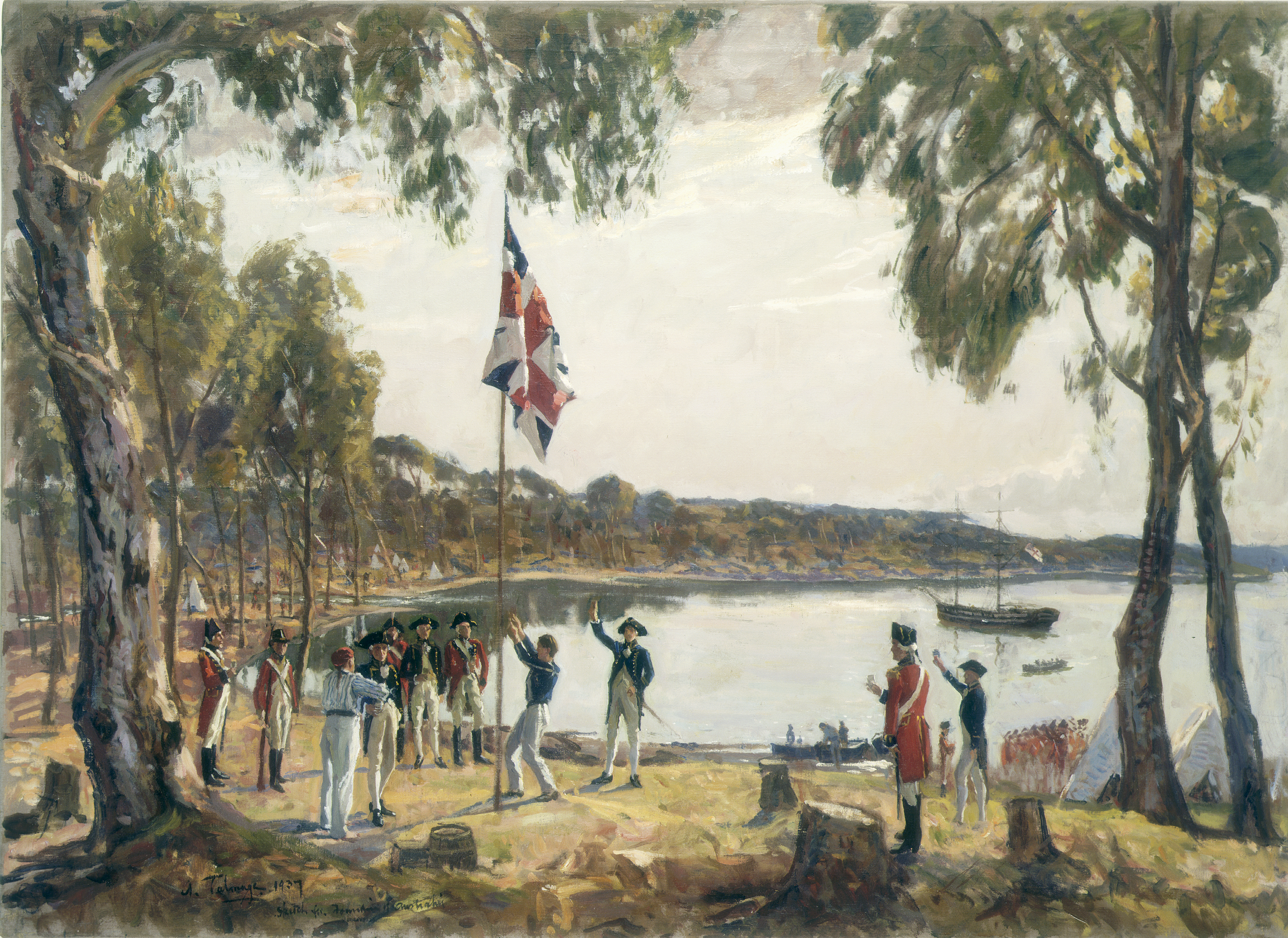
The Founding of Australia, 26 January 1788, by Captain Arthur Phillip R.N., Sydney Cove. Painting by Algernon Talmage

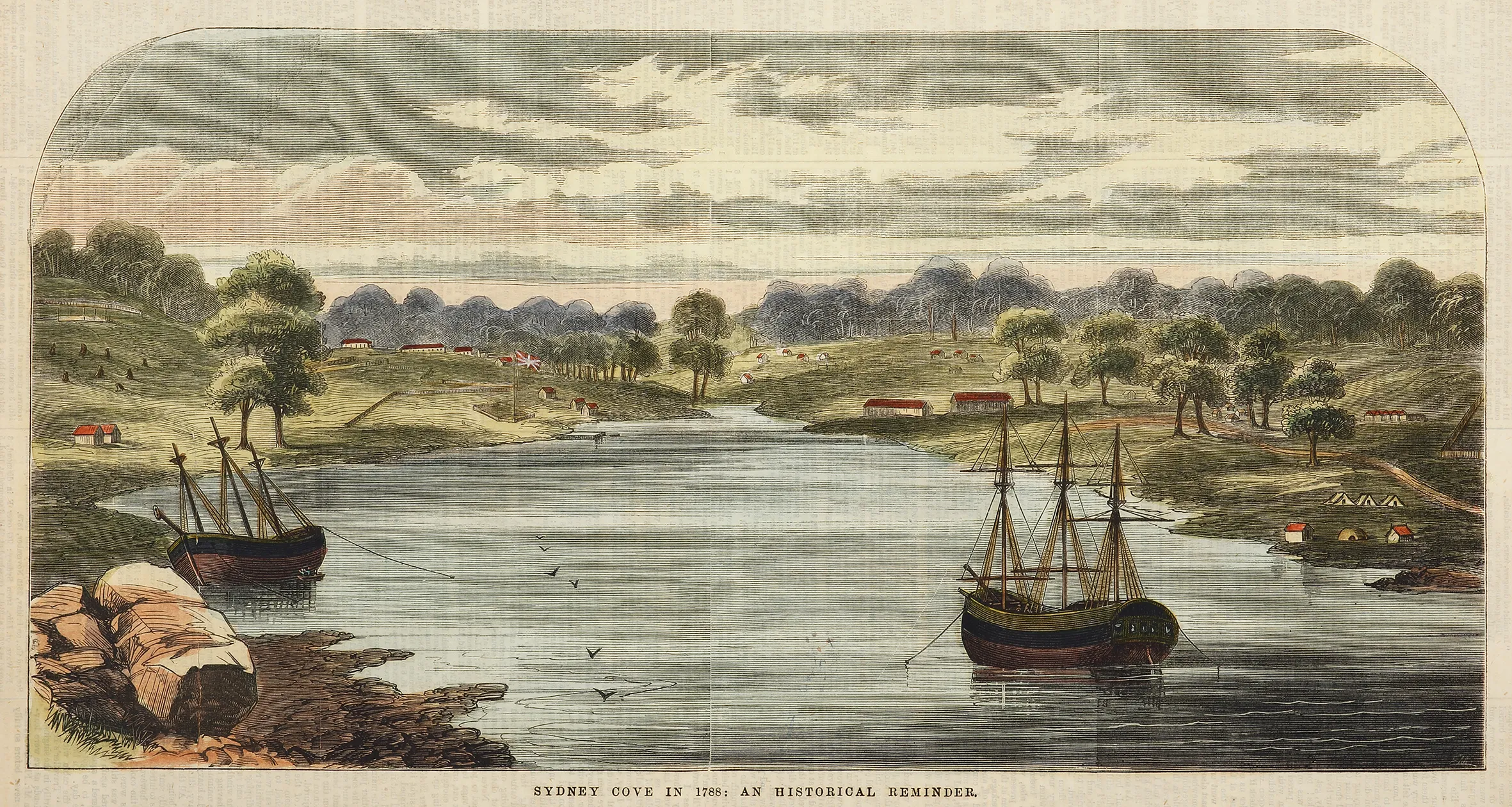
Sydney Cove in 1788, by John Hunter

Britain had been sending convicts to its American colonies for most of the eighteenth century, and the loss of these colonies in 1783 was the impetus to establish a penal colony at Botany Bay. Proponents of colonisation also pointed to the strategic importance of a new base in the Asia-Pacific region and its potential to provide much-needed timber and flax for the navy.

The First Fleet of 11 ships under the command of Captain Arthur Phillip arrived in Botany Bay in January 1788. It comprised more than a thousand settlers, including 736 convicts. The fleet soon moved to the more suitable Port Jackson where a settlement was established at Sydney Cove on 26 January 1788. The colony of New South Wales was formally proclaimed by Governor Phillip on 7 February 1788. Sydney Cove offered a fresh water supply and a safe harbour, which Philip described as "the finest Harbour in the World ... Here a Thousand Sail of the Line may ride in the most perfect Security".

The settlement was planned to be a self-sufficient penal colony based on subsistence agriculture. Trade and shipbuilding were banned in order to keep the convicts isolated. However, the soil around the settlement proved poor and the first crops failed, leading to several years of hunger and strict rationing. The food crisis was relieved with the arrival of the Second Fleet in mid-1790 and the Third Fleet in 1791. Former convicts received small grants of land, and government and private farms spread to the more fertile lands around Parramatta, Windsor and Camden on the Cumberland Plain. By 1804, the colony was self-sufficient in food.

A smallpox epidemic in April 1789 killed about half the region's Indigenous population. In November 1790 Bennelong led a group of survivors of the Sydney clans into the settlement, establishing a continuous presence of Aboriginal Australians in settled Sydney.

Phillip had been given no instructions for urban development, but in July 1788 submitted a plan for the new town at Sydney Cove. It included a wide central avenue, a permanent Government House, law courts, hospital and other public buildings, but no provision for warehouses, shops, or other commercial buildings. Phillip promptly ignored his own plan, and unplanned development became a feature of Sydney's topography.

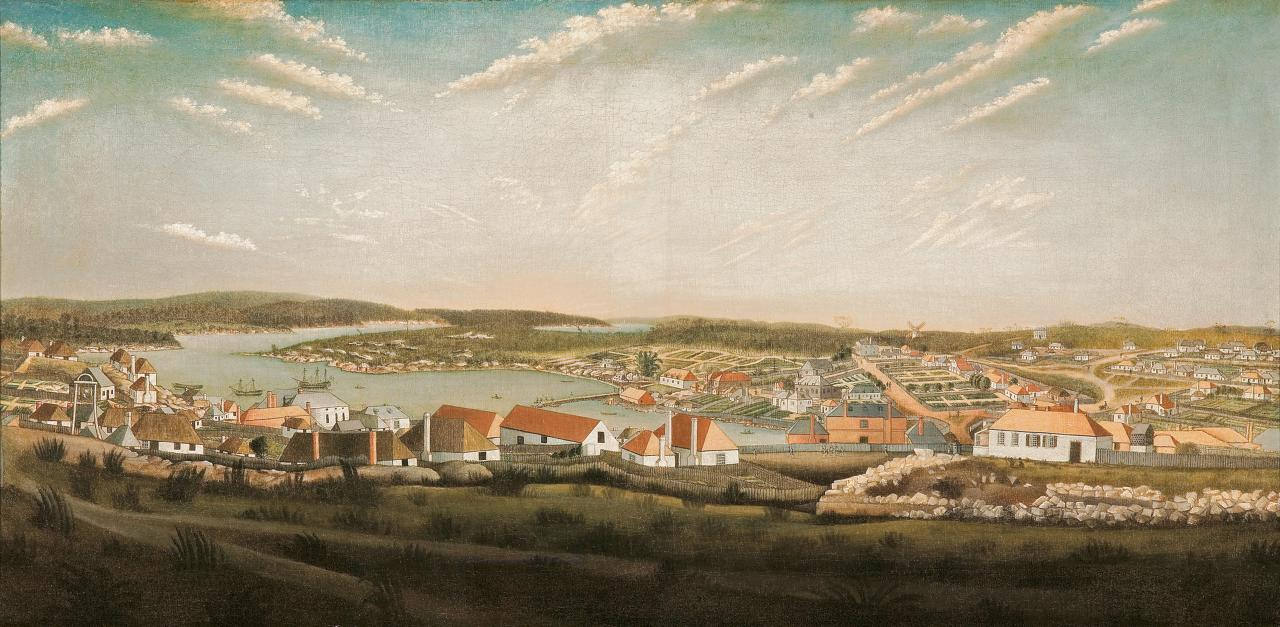
Thomas Watling's View of the Town of Sydney in the Colony of New South Wales, 1799

After Phillip's departure in December 1792, the colony's military officers began acquiring land and importing consumer goods from visiting ships. Former convicts engaged in trade and opened small businesses. Soldiers and former convicts built houses on Crown land, with or without official permission, in what was now commonly called Sydney town. Governor William Bligh (1806–08) imposed restrictions on commerce and ordered the demolition of buildings erected on Crown land, including some owned by past and serving military officers. The resulting conflict culminated in the Rum Rebellion of 1808, in which Bligh was deposed by the New South Wales Corps.

Governor Lachlan Macquarie (1810–1821) played a leading role in the development of Sydney and New South Wales, establishing a bank, a currency and a hospital. He employed a planner to design the street layout of Sydney and commissioned the construction of roads, wharves, churches, and public buildings. Parramatta Road, linking Sydney and Parramatta, was opened in 1811, and a road across the Blue Mountains was completed in 1815, opening the way for large-scale farming and grazing west of the Great Dividing Range.

Following the departure of Macquarie, official policy encouraged the emigration of free British settlers to New South Wales. Immigration to the colony increased from 900 free settlers in 1826–30 to 29,000 in 1836–40, many of whom settled in Sydney. By the 1840s, Sydney exhibited a geographic divide between poor and working-class residents living west of the Tank Stream in areas such as The Rocks, and the more affluent residents living to its east. Free settlers, free-born residents and former convicts now represented the vast majority of the population of Sydney, leading to increasing public agitation for responsible government and an end to transportation. Transportation to New South Wales ceased in 1840.

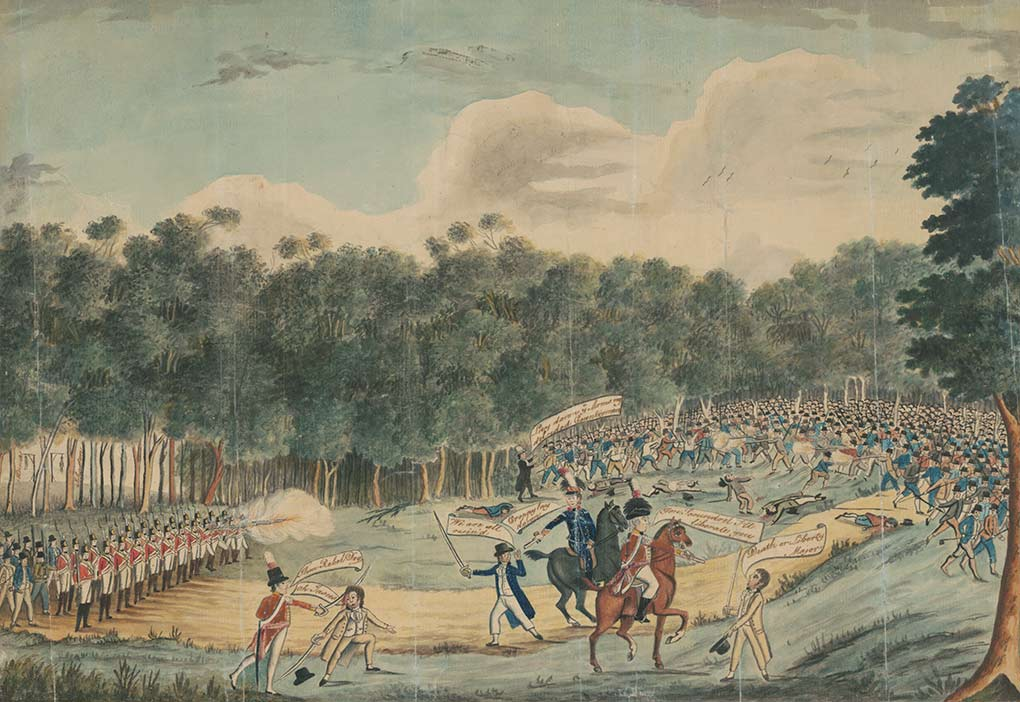
The Castle Hill convict rebellion of 1804

==== Conflict on the Cumberland Plain ====
In 1804, Irish convicts led around 300 rebels in the Castle Hill Rebellion, an attempt to march on Sydney, commandeer a ship, and sail to freedom. Poorly armed, and with their leader Philip Cunningham captured, the main body of insurgents were routed by about 100 troops and volunteers at Rouse Hill. At least 39 convicts were killed in the uprising and subsequent executions.

As the colony spread to the more fertile lands around the Hawkesbury River, north-west of Sydney, conflict between the settlers and the Darug people intensified, reaching a peak from 1794 to 1810. Bands of Darug people, led by Pemulwuy and later by his son Tedbury, burned crops, killed livestock and raided settler stores in a pattern of resistance that was to be repeated as the colonial frontier expanded. A military garrison was established on the Hawkesbury in 1795. The death toll from 1794 to 1800 was 26 settlers and up to 200 Darug.

Conflict again erupted from 1814 to 1816 with the expansion of the colony into Dharawal country in the Nepean region south-west of Sydney. Following the deaths of several settlers, Governor Macquarie dispatched three military detachments into Dharawal lands, culminating in the Appin massacre (April 1816) in which at least 14 Aboriginal people were killed.

=== Colonial city (1841–1900) ===
The New South Wales Legislative Council became a semi-elected body in 1842. Sydney was declared a city the same year, and a governing council established, elected on a restrictive property franchise.

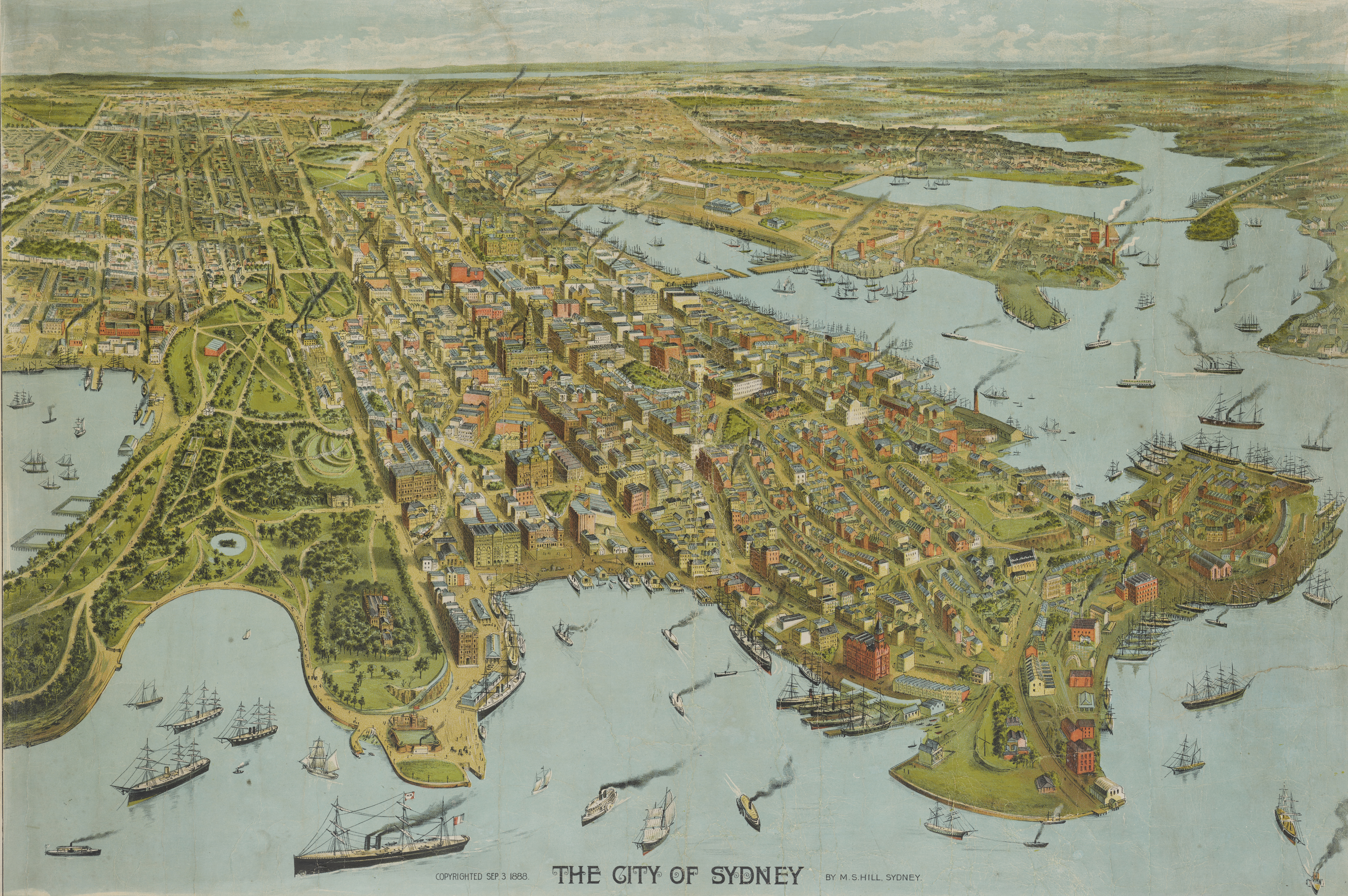
Aerial illustration of Sydney, 1888

The discovery of gold in New South Wales and Victoria in 1851 initially caused economic disruption as men moved to the goldfields. Melbourne soon overtook Sydney as Australia's largest city, leading to an enduring rivalry between the two. However, increased immigration from overseas and wealth from gold exports increased demand for housing, consumer goods, services and urban amenities. The New South Wales government also stimulated growth by investing heavily in railways, trams, roads, ports, telegraph, schools and urban services. The population of Sydney and its suburbs grew from 95,600 in 1861 to 386,900 in 1891. The city developed many of its characteristic features. The growing population packed into rows of terrace houses in narrow streets. New public buildings of sandstone abounded, including at the University of Sydney (1854–61), the Australian Museum (1858–66), the Town Hall (1868–88), and the General Post Office (1866–92). Elaborate coffee palaces and hotels were erected. Daylight bathing at Sydney's beaches was banned, but segregated bathing at designated ocean baths was popular.

Drought, the winding down of public works and a financial crisis led to economic depression in Sydney throughout most of the 1890s. Meanwhile, the Sydney-based premier of New South Wales, George Reid, became a key figure in the process of federation.

=== State capital (1901–present) ===
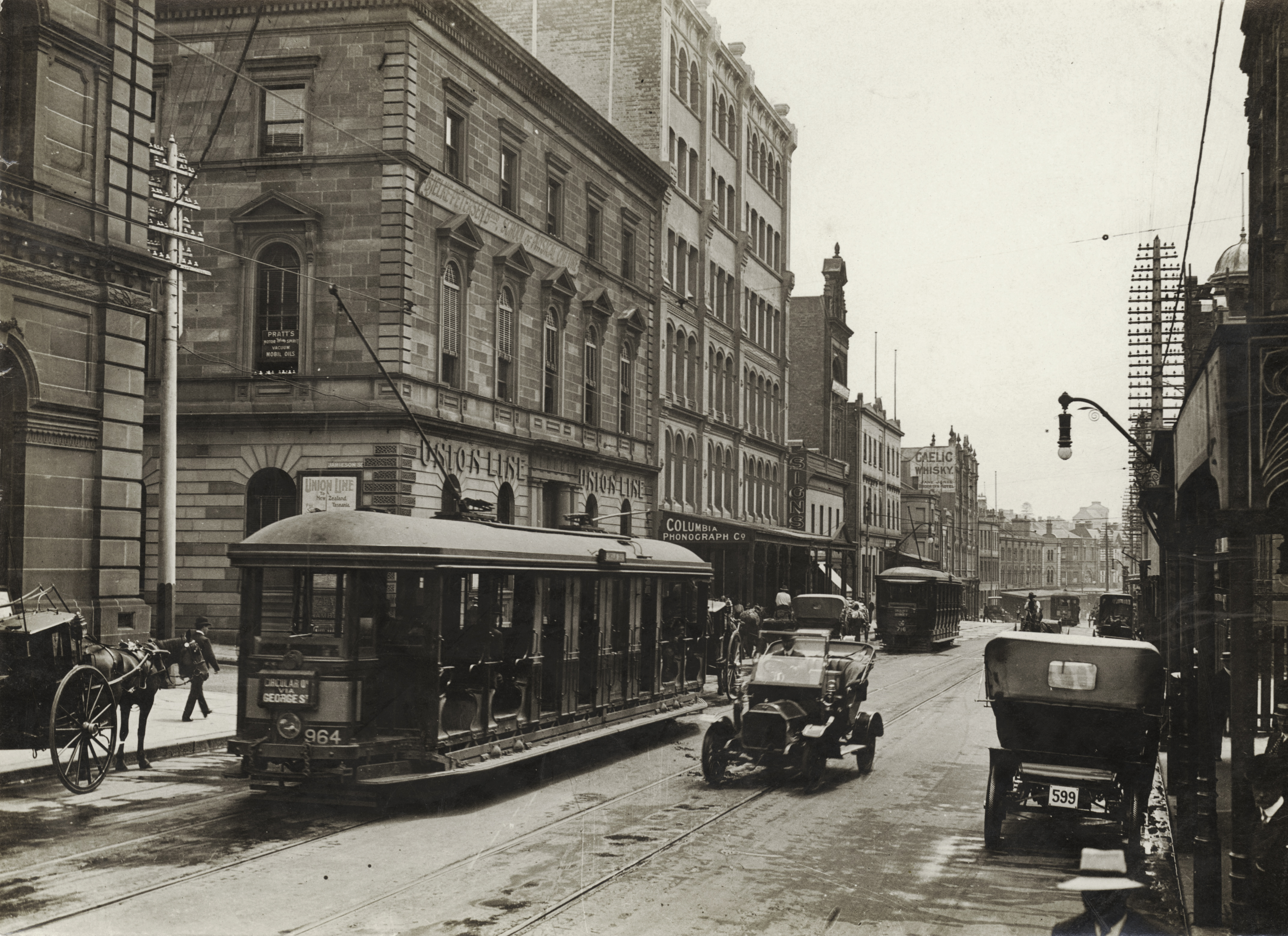
A tramcar on George Street in 1920. Sydney once had one of the largest tram networks in the British Empire.

When the six colonies federated on 1 January 1901, Sydney became the capital of the State of New South Wales. The spread of bubonic plague in 1900 prompted the state government to modernise the wharves and demolish inner-city slums. The outbreak of the First World War in 1914 saw more Sydney males volunteer for the armed forces than the Commonwealth authorities could process, and helped reduce unemployment. Those returning from the war in 1918 were promised "homes fit for heroes" in new suburbs such as Daceyville and Matraville. "Garden suburbs" and mixed industrial and residential developments also grew along the rail and tram corridors. The population reached one million in 1926, after Sydney had regained its position as the most populous city in Australia. The government created jobs with massive public projects such as the electrification of the Sydney rail network and building the Sydney Harbour Bridge.

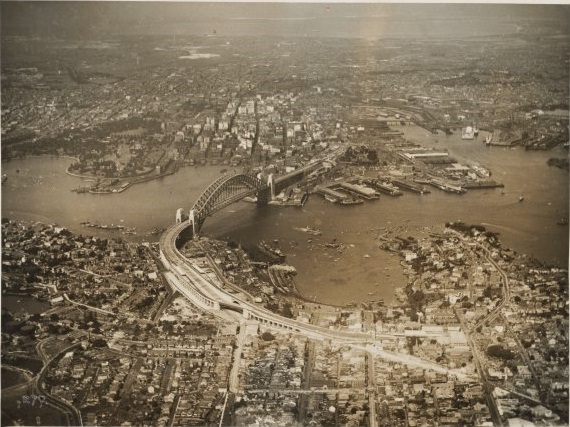
Sydney Harbour Bridge opening day, 19 March 1932

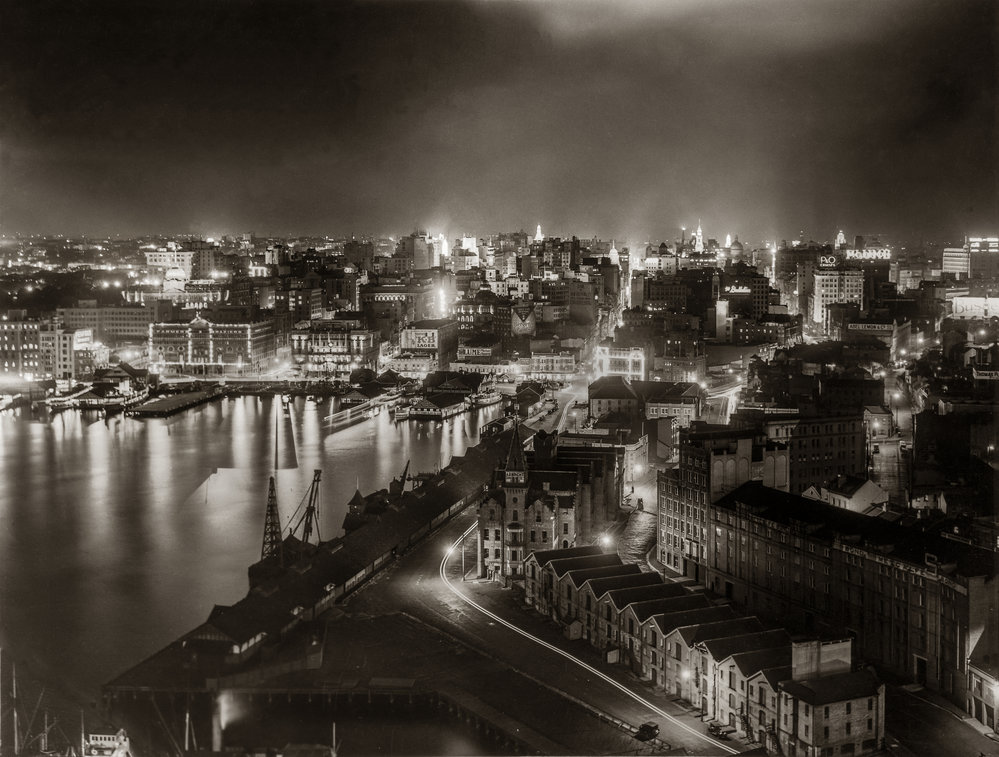
The Sydney skyline at night in 1938.

Sydney was more severely affected by the Great Depression of the 1930s than regional New South Wales or Melbourne. New building almost came to a standstill, and by 1933 the unemployment rate for male workers was 28 per cent, but over 40 per cent in working class areas such as Alexandria and Redfern. Many families were evicted from their homes and shanty towns grew along coastal Sydney and Botany Bay, the largest being "Happy Valley" at La Perouse. The Depression also exacerbated political divisions. In March 1932, when populist Labor premier Jack Lang attempted to open the Sydney Harbour Bridge he was upstaged by Francis de Groot of the far-right New Guard, who slashed the ribbon with a sabre.

In January 1938, Sydney celebrated the Empire Games and the sesquicentenary of European settlement in Australia. One journalist wrote, "Golden beaches. Sun tanned men and maidens...Red-roofed villas terraced above the blue waters of the harbour...Even Melbourne seems like some grey and stately city of Northern Europe compared with Sydney's sub-tropical splendours.". A congress of the "Aborigines of Australia" declared 26 January "A Day of Mourning" for "the whiteman's seizure of our country."

With the outbreak of Second World War in 1939, Sydney experienced a surge in industrial development. Unemployment virtually disappeared and women moved into jobs previously typically reserved for males. Sydney was attacked by Japanese submarines in May and June 1942 with 21 killed. Households built air raid shelters and performed drills. Military establishments in response to World War II in Australia included the Garden Island Tunnel System, the only tunnel warfare complex in Sydney, and the heritage-listed military fortification systems Bradleys Head Fortification Complex and Middle Head Fortifications, which were part of a total defence system for Sydney Harbour.

A post-war immigration and baby boom saw a rapid increase in Sydney's population and the spread of low-density housing in suburbs throughout the Cumberland Plain. Immigrants—mostly from Britain and continental Europe—and their children accounted for over three-quarters of Sydney's population growth between 1947 and 1971. The newly created Cumberland County Council oversaw low-density residential developments, the largest at Green Valley and Mount Druitt. Older residential centres such as Parramatta, Bankstown and Liverpool became suburbs of the metropolis. Manufacturing, protected by high tariffs, employed over a third of the workforce from 1945 to the 1960s. However, as the long post-war economic boom progressed, retail and other service industries became the main source of new jobs.

An estimated one million onlookers, most of the city's population, watched Queen Elizabeth II land in 1954 at Farm Cove where Captain Phillip had raised the Union Jack 165 years earlier, commencing her Australian Royal Tour. It was the first time a reigning monarch stepped onto Australian soil.

Increasing high-rise development in Sydney and the expansion of suburbs beyond the "green belt" envisaged by the planners of the 1950s resulted in community protests. In the early 1970s, trade unions and resident action groups imposed green bans on development projects in historic areas such as The Rocks. Federal, State and local governments introduced heritage and environmental legislation. The Sydney Opera House was also controversial for its cost and disputes between architect Jørn Utzon and government officials. However, soon after it opened in 1973 it became a major tourist attraction and symbol of the city. The progressive reduction in tariff protection from 1974 began the transformation of Sydney from a manufacturing centre to a "world city". From the 1980s, overseas immigration grew rapidly, with Asia, the Middle East and Africa becoming major sources. By 2021, the population of Sydney was over 5.2 million, with 40% of the population born overseas. China and India overtook England as the largest source countries for overseas-born residents.

== Geography ==
=== Topography ===
Sydney lies on a submergent coastline where the ocean level has risen to flood deep rias.

Sydney is a coastal basin with the Tasman Sea to the east, the Blue Mountains to the west, the Hawkesbury River to the north, and the Woronora Plateau to the south.

Sydney spans two geographic regions. The Cumberland Plain lies to the south and west of the Harbour and is relatively flat. The Hornsby Plateau is located to the north and is dissected by steep valleys. The flat areas of the south were the first to be developed; it was not until the construction of the Sydney Harbour Bridge that the northern reaches became more heavily populated. Seventy surf beaches can be found along its coastline, with Bondi Beach being the most famous.

The Nepean River wraps around the western edge of the city and becomes the Hawkesbury River before reaching Broken Bay. Most of Sydney's water storages can be found on tributaries of the Nepean River. The Parramatta River is mostly industrial and drains a large area of Sydney's western suburbs into Port Jackson. The southern parts of the city are drained by the Georges River and the Cooks River into Botany Bay.

There is no single definition of the boundaries of Sydney. The Australian Statistical Geography Standard definition of Greater Sydney covers 12,369 square kilometres (4,776 square miles), and includes the local government areas of Central Coast in the north, Hawkesbury in the north-west, Blue Mountains in the west, Sutherland Shire in the south, and Wollondilly in the south-west. The local government area of the City of Sydney covers about 26 square kilometres from Garden island in the east to Bicentennial Park in the west, and south to the suburbs of Alexandria and Rosebery.

=== Geology ===
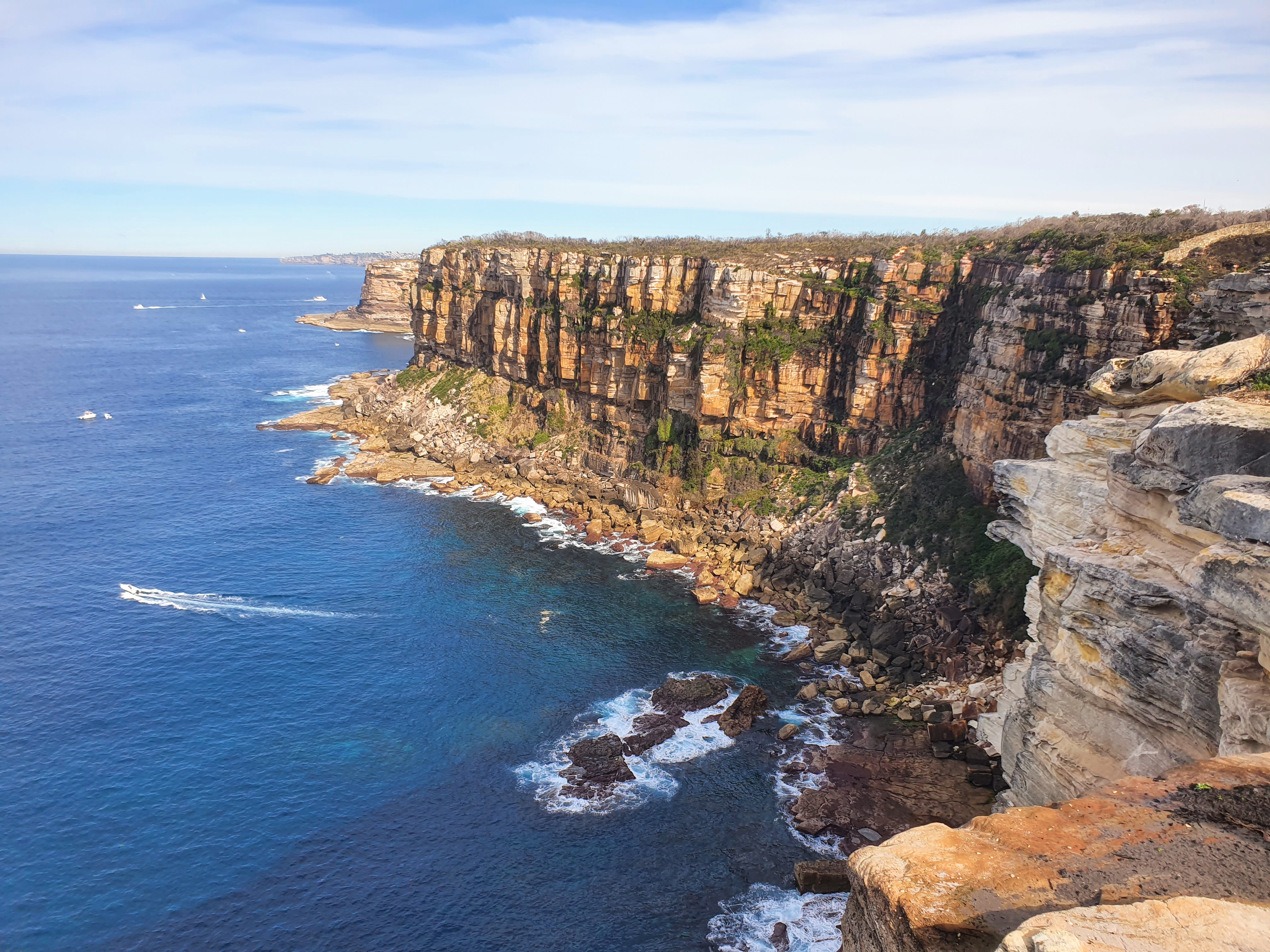
Almost all of the exposed rocks around Sydney are Sydney sandstone.

Sydney is made up of mostly Triassic rock with some recent igneous dykes and volcanic necks (typically found in the Prospect dolerite intrusion, west of Sydney). The Sydney Basin was formed in the early Triassic period. The sand that was to become the sandstone of today was laid down between 360 and 200 million years ago. The sandstone has traditionally been interpreted as the product of a large braided river system, comparable in scale and depositional style to the modern Brahmaputra River in Bangladesh. The sandstone has shale lenses and fossil riverbeds.

The Sydney Basin bioregion includes coastal features of cliffs, beaches, and estuaries. Deep river valleys known as rias were carved during the Triassic period in the Hawkesbury sandstone of the coastal region. The rising sea level between 18,000 and 6,000 years ago flooded the rias to form estuaries and deep harbours. Port Jackson, better known as Sydney Harbour, is one such ria. Sydney features two major soil types: sandy soils (which originate from the Hawkesbury sandstone) and clay (which are from shales and volcanic rocks), though some soils may be a mixture of the two.

Directly overlying the older Hawkesbury sandstone is the Wianamatta shale, a geological feature found in western Sydney that was deposited in connection with a large river delta during the Middle Triassic. The Wianamatta shale generally comprises fine grained sedimentary rocks such as shales, mudstones, ironstones, siltstones and laminites, with less common sandstone units. The Wianamatta Group is made up of Bringelly Shale, Minchinbury Sandstone and Ashfield Shale. Sydney is also crossed by several igneous intrusions, the most prominent of which is the Great Sydney Dyke, a Jurassic dolerite intrusion extending for at least 9 kilometres (5.6 mi) across the inner city from the Glebe Island area towards the eastern coastline. The continental shelf of Australia is only 25.9 km (16.1 mi) away from the coast of Sydney, and that is where the Tasman Abyssal Plain lies.

=== Ecology ===
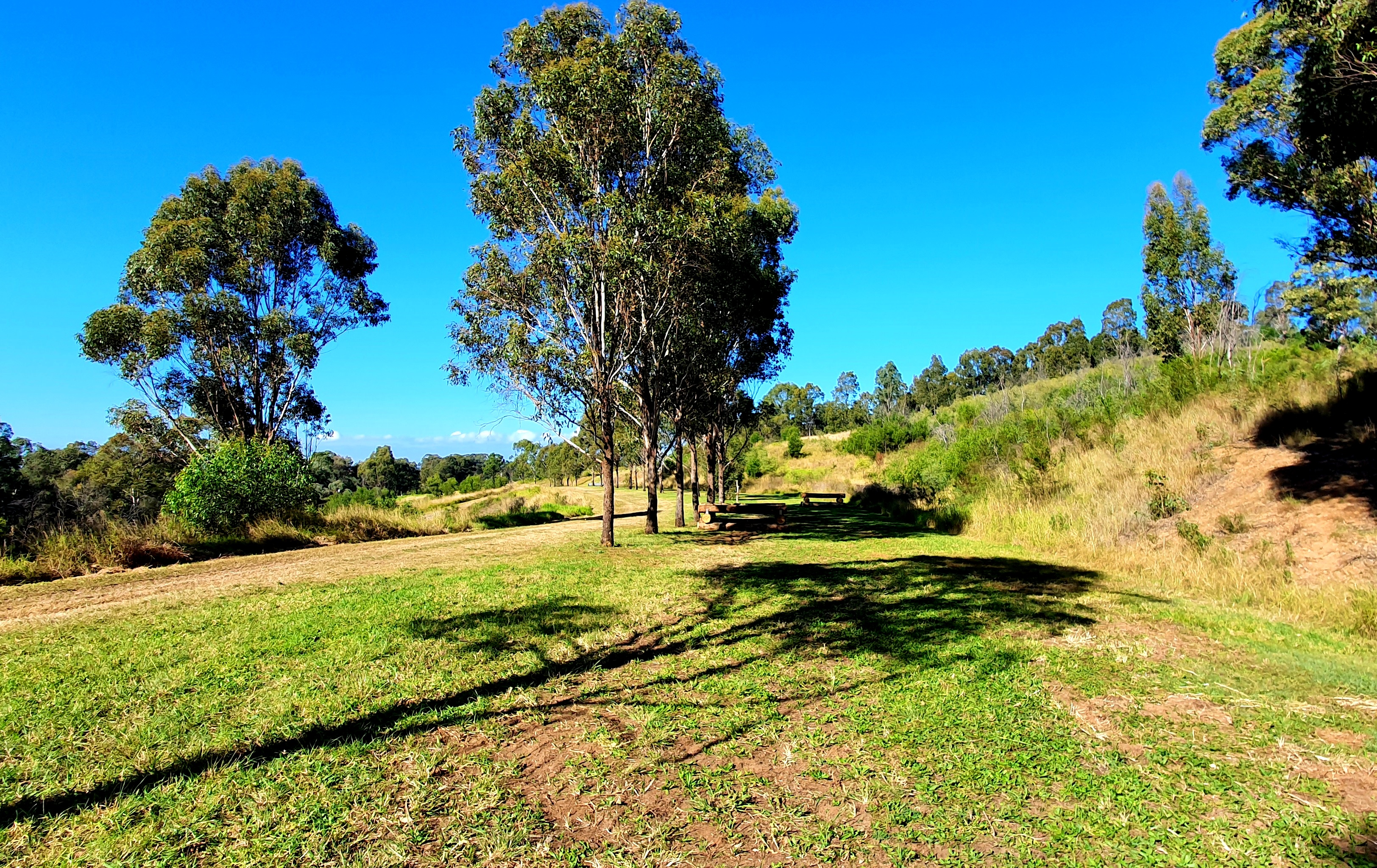
Typical grassy woodland in the Sydney metropolitan area

The most prevalent plant communities in the Sydney region are grassy woodlands (i.e. savannas) and some pockets of dry sclerophyll forests, which consist of eucalyptus trees, casuarinas, melaleucas, corymbias and angophoras, with shrubs (typically wattles, callistemons, grevilleas and banksias), and a semi-continuous grass in the understory. The plants in this community tend to have rough, spiky leaves due to low soil fertility. Sydney also features a few areas of wet sclerophyll forests in the wetter, elevated areas in the north and northeast. These forests are defined by straight, tall tree canopies with a moist understory of soft-leaved shrubs, tree ferns and herbs.

The predominant vegetation community in Sydney is the Cumberland Plain Woodland in Western Sydney (Cumberland Plain), followed by the Sydney Turpentine-Ironbark Forest in the Inner West and Northern Sydney, the Eastern Suburbs Banksia Scrub in the coastline and the Blue Gum High Forest scantily present in the North Shore – all of which are critically endangered. The city also includes the Sydney Sandstone Ridgetop Woodland found in Ku-ring-gai Chase National Park on the Hornsby Plateau to the north.

According to the Senseable City Lab at the Massachusetts Institute of Technology (MIT), which measures street-level urban greenery using the Green View Index (GVI), Sydney recorded a GVI of 25.9%. Among the cities assessed, Sydney ranked fourth globally for visible street tree cover, behind Tampa (36.1%), Singapore (29.3%) and Oslo (28.8%), and was equal with Vancouver (25.9%).

Sydney is home to dozens of bird species, which commonly include the Australian raven, Australian magpie, crested pigeon, noisy miner and the pied currawong. Introduced bird species ubiquitously found in Sydney are the common myna, common starling, house sparrow and the spotted dove. Reptile species are also numerous and predominantly include skinks. Sydney has a few mammal and spider species, such as the grey-headed flying fox and the Sydney funnel-web, respectively, and has a huge diversity of marine species inhabiting its harbour and beaches.

=== Climate ===
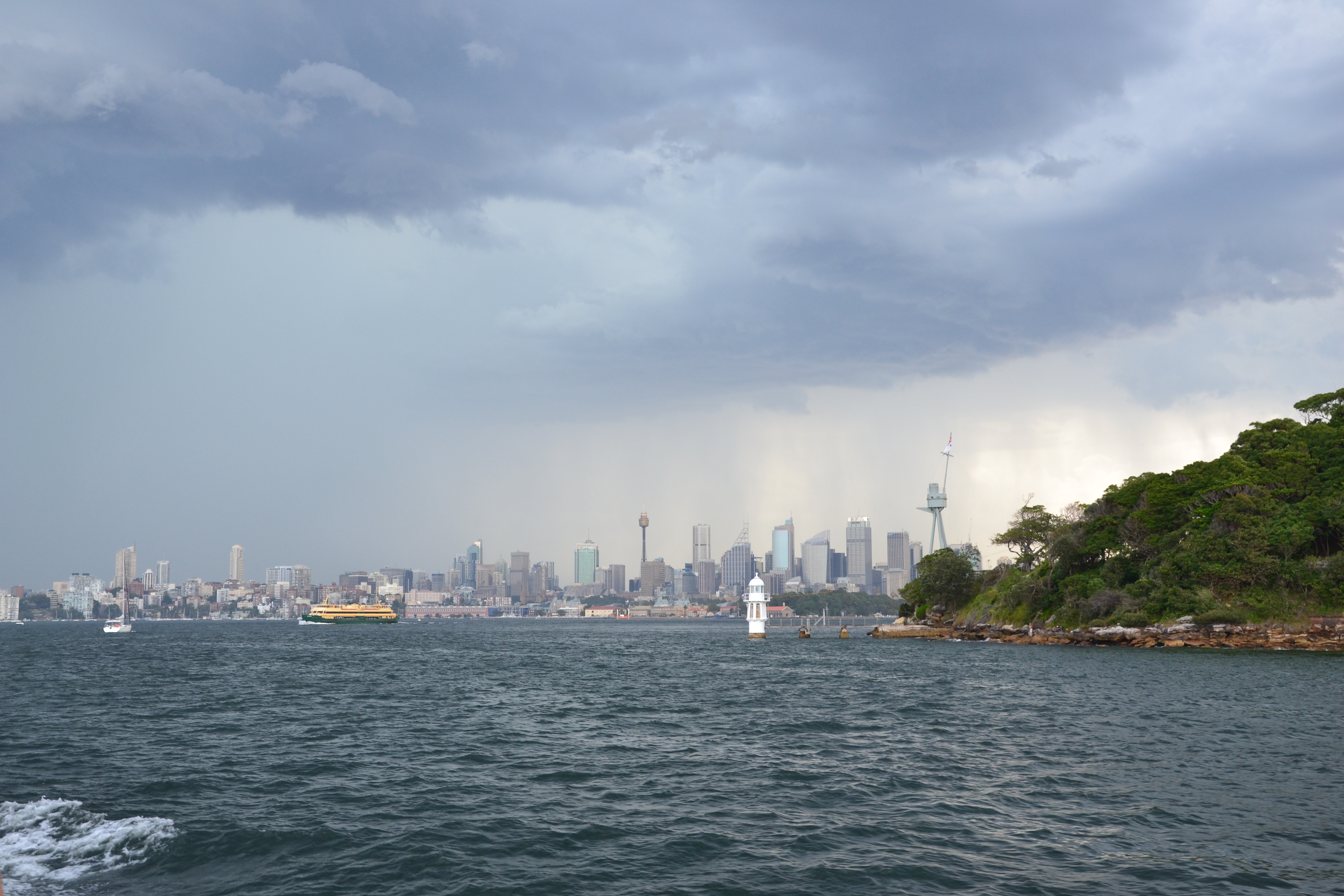
A summer storm over Sydney Harbour

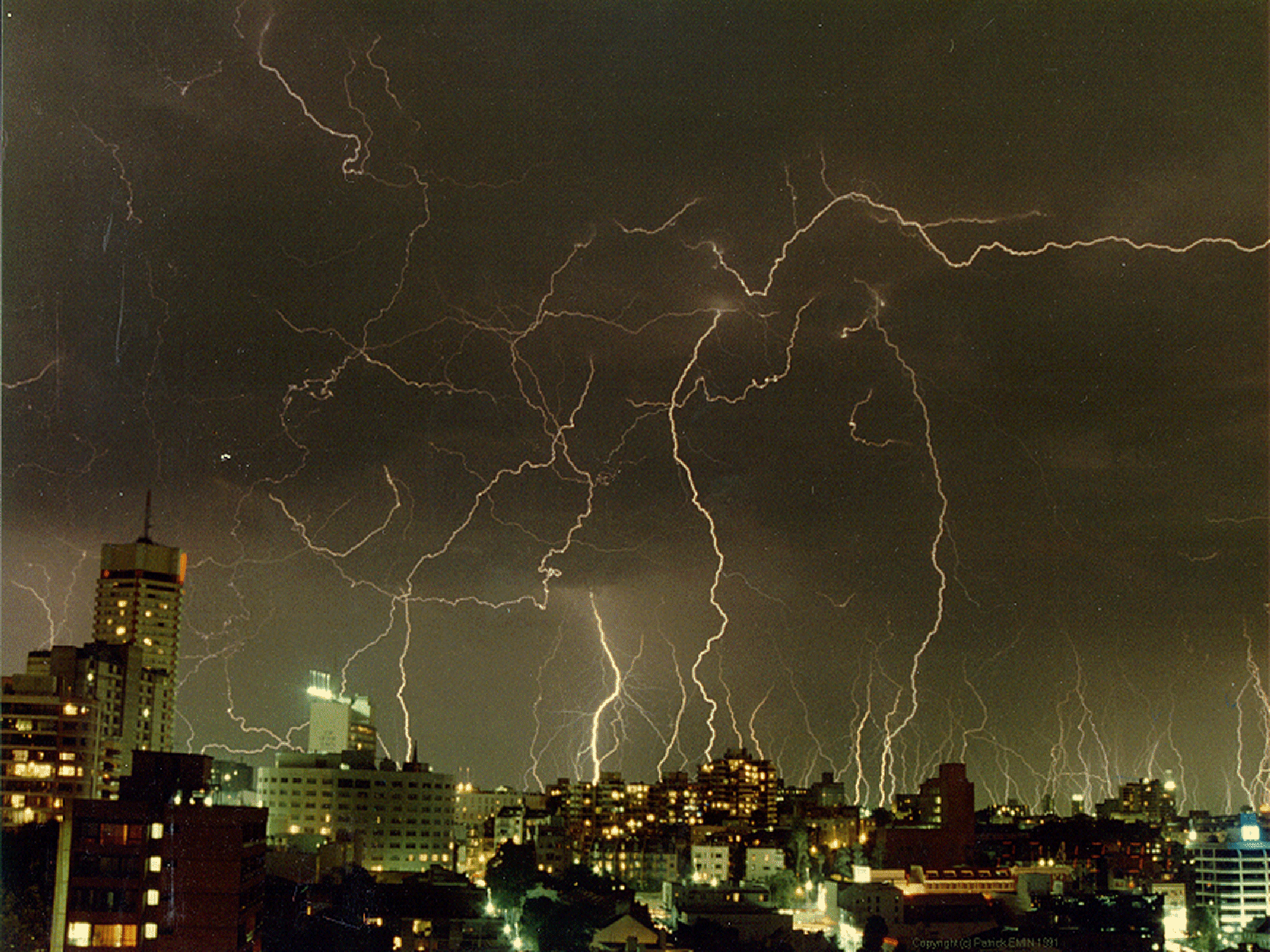
Lightning is a frequent occurrence in the spring and summer months in Sydney.

Under the Köppen–Geiger classification, Sydney has a humid subtropical climate (Cfa) with "warm, sometimes hot" summers and "generally mild", to "cool" winters. The El Niño–Southern Oscillation, the Indian Ocean Dipole and the Southern Annular Mode play an important role in determining Sydney's weather patterns: drought and bushfire on the one hand, and storms and flooding on the other, associated with the opposite phases of the oscillation in Australia. The weather is moderated by proximity to the ocean, and more extreme temperatures are recorded in the inland western suburbs because Sydney CBD is more affected by the oceanic climate drivers than the western suburbs.

At Sydney's primary weather station at Observatory Hill, extreme temperatures have ranged from 45.8 °C (114.4 °F) on 18 January 2013 to 2.1 °C (35.8 °F) on 22 June 1932. An average of 14.9 days a year have temperatures at or above 30 °C (86 °F) in the central business district (CBD). In contrast, the metropolitan area averages between 35 and 65 days, depending on the suburb. The hottest day in the metropolitan area occurred in Penrith on 4 January 2020, where a high of 48.9 °C (120.0 °F) was recorded. The average annual temperature of the sea ranges from 18.5 °C (65.3 °F) in September to 23.7 °C (74.7 °F) in February. Sydney has an average of 7.2 hours of sunshine per day and 109.5 clear days annually. Due to the inland location, frost is recorded early in the morning in Western Sydney a few times in winter. Autumn and spring are the transitional seasons, with spring showing a larger temperature variation than autumn.

Sydney experiences an urban heat island effect. This makes certain parts of the city more vulnerable to extreme heat, including coastal suburbs. In late spring and summer, temperatures over 35 °C (95 °F) are not uncommon, though hot, dry conditions are usually ended by a southerly buster, a powerful southerly that brings gale winds and a rapid fall in temperature. Since Sydney is downwind of the Great Dividing Range, it frequently experiences dry, westerly foehn winds typically in winter and early spring (which are the reason for its warm maximum temperatures). Westerly winds are intense when the Roaring Forties (or the Southern Annular Mode) shift towards southeastern Australia, where they may damage homes and affect flights, in addition to making the temperature seem colder than it actually is.

Rainfall has a moderate to low variability and has historically been fairly uniform throughout the year, although in recent years it has been more summer-dominant and erratic. Precipitation is usually higher in summer through to autumn, and lower in late winter to early spring. In late autumn and winter, east coast lows may bring large amounts of rainfall, especially in the CBD. In the warm season black nor'easters are usually the cause of heavy rain events, though other forms of low-pressure areas, including remnants of ex-cyclones, may also bring heavy deluge and afternoon thunderstorms. Snowfall was last reported in the city on 28 June 1836, when it was described as being nearly 25.4 mm (1.00 in) deep. However, following a fall of graupel (soft hail) across the Upper North Shore in July 2008, which was mistaken by many for snow, meteorologists suggested that the 1836 event may also have been graupel rather than snow. In 2009, dry conditions brought a severe dust storm towards the city.

Climate data for Sydney (Observatory Hill) 1991–2020 averages, 1861–present extremes
Month	Jan	Feb	Mar	Apr	May	Jun	Jul	Aug	Sep	Oct	Nov	Dec	Year
Record high °C (°F)	45.8 (114.4)	42.1 (107.8)	39.8 (103.6)	35.4 (95.7)	30.0 (86.0)	26.9 (80.4)	26.5 (79.7)	31.3 (88.3)	34.6 (94.3)	38.2 (100.8)	41.8 (107.2)	42.2 (108.0)	45.8 (114.4)
Mean maximum °C (°F)	36.8 (98.2)	34.1 (93.4)	32.2 (90.0)	29.7 (85.5)	26.2 (79.2)	22.3 (72.1)	22.9 (73.2)	25.4 (77.7)	29.9 (85.8)	33.6 (92.5)	34.1 (93.4)	34.4 (93.9)	38.8 (101.8)
Mean daily maximum °C (°F)	27.0 (80.6)	26.8 (80.2)	25.7 (78.3)	23.6 (74.5)	20.9 (69.6)	18.3 (64.9)	17.9 (64.2)	19.3 (66.7)	21.6 (70.9)	23.2 (73.8)	24.2 (75.6)	25.7 (78.3)	22.8 (73.0)
Daily mean °C (°F)	23.5 (74.3)	23.4 (74.1)	22.1 (71.8)	19.5 (67.1)	16.6 (61.9)	14.2 (57.6)	13.4 (56.1)	14.5 (58.1)	17.0 (62.6)	18.9 (66.0)	20.4 (68.7)	22.1 (71.8)	18.8 (65.8)
Mean daily minimum °C (°F)	20.0 (68.0)	19.9 (67.8)	18.4 (65.1)	15.3 (59.5)	12.3 (54.1)	10.0 (50.0)	8.9 (48.0)	9.7 (49.5)	12.3 (54.1)	14.6 (58.3)	16.6 (61.9)	18.4 (65.1)	14.7 (58.5)
Mean minimum °C (°F)	16.1 (61.0)	16.1 (61.0)	14.2 (57.6)	11.0 (51.8)	8.3 (46.9)	6.5 (43.7)	5.7 (42.3)	6.1 (43.0)	8.0 (46.4)	9.8 (49.6)	12.0 (53.6)	13.9 (57.0)	5.3 (41.5)
Record low °C (°F)	10.6 (51.1)	9.6 (49.3)	9.3 (48.7)	7.0 (44.6)	4.4 (39.9)	2.1 (35.8)	2.2 (36.0)	2.7 (36.9)	4.9 (40.8)	5.7 (42.3)	7.7 (45.9)	9.1 (48.4)	2.1 (35.8)
Average rainfall mm (inches)	91.1 (3.59)	131.5 (5.18)	117.5 (4.63)	114.1 (4.49)	100.8 (3.97)	142.0 (5.59)	80.3 (3.16)	75.1 (2.96)	63.4 (2.50)	67.7 (2.67)	90.6 (3.57)	73.0 (2.87)	1,149.7 (45.26)
Average rainy days (≥ 1 mm)	8.2	9.0	10.1	7.9	7.9	9.3	7.2	5.6	5.8	7.6	8.7	7.9	95.2
Average afternoon relative humidity (%)	60	62	59	58	58	56	52	47	49	53	57	58	56
Average dew point °C (°F)	16.5 (61.7)	17.2 (63.0)	15.4 (59.7)	12.7 (54.9)	10.3 (50.5)	7.8 (46.0)	6.1 (43.0)	5.4 (41.7)	7.8 (46.0)	10.2 (50.4)	12.6 (54.7)	14.6 (58.3)	11.4 (52.5)
Mean monthly sunshine hours	232.5	205.9	210.8	213.0	204.6	171.0	207.7	248.0	243.0	244.9	222.0	235.6	2,639
Percentage possible sunshine	53	54	55	63	63	57	66	72	67	61	55	55	60
Source 1: Bureau of Meteorology
Source 2: Bureau of Meteorology, Sydney Airport (sunshine hours)

== Regions ==
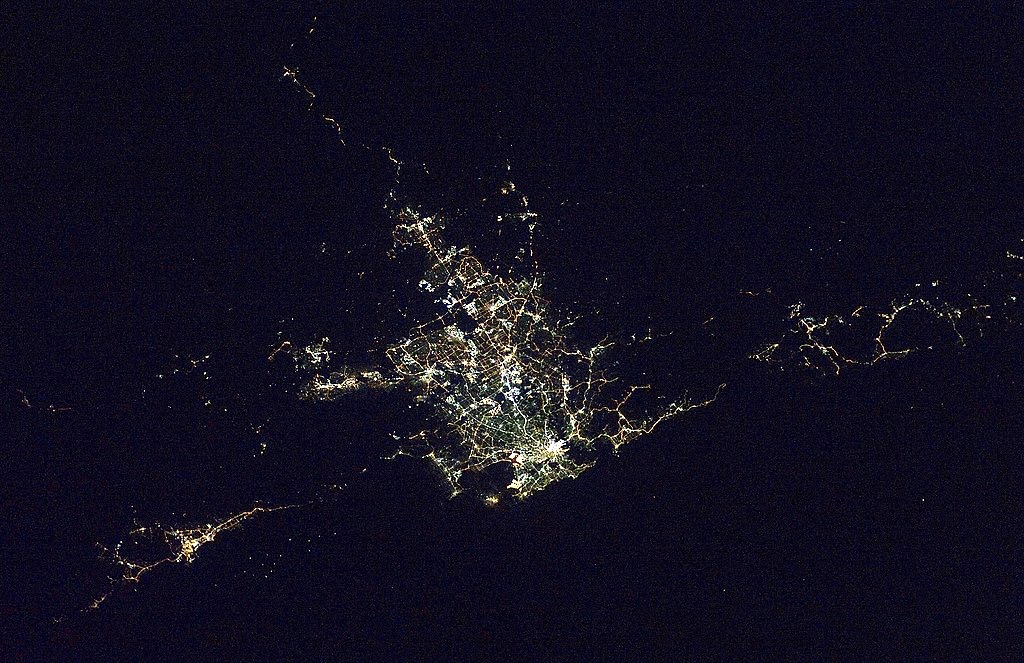
Sydney area at night, facing west, from the ISS. Wollongong is bottom left, and the Central Coast is at the far right.

The Greater Sydney Commission divides Sydney into three "cities" and five "districts" based on the 33 LGAs in the metropolitan area. The "metropolis of three cities" comprises Eastern Harbour City, Central River City and Western Parkland City. The Australian Bureau of Statistics also includes City of Central Coast (the former Gosford City and Wyong Shire) as part of Greater Sydney for population counts, adding 330,000 people.

=== Inner suburbs ===
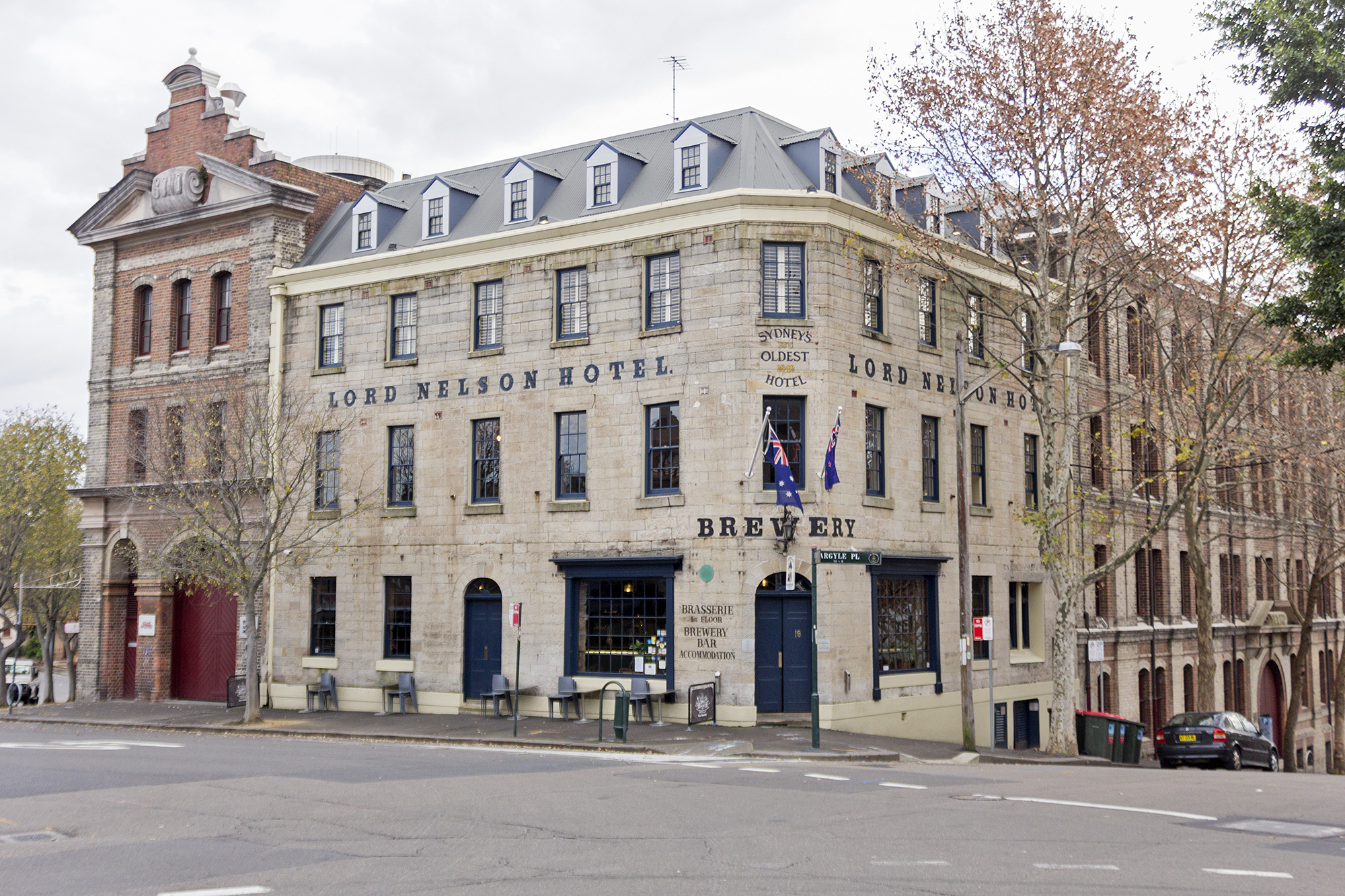
Historical buildings in Millers Point, an inner suburb north of the CBD

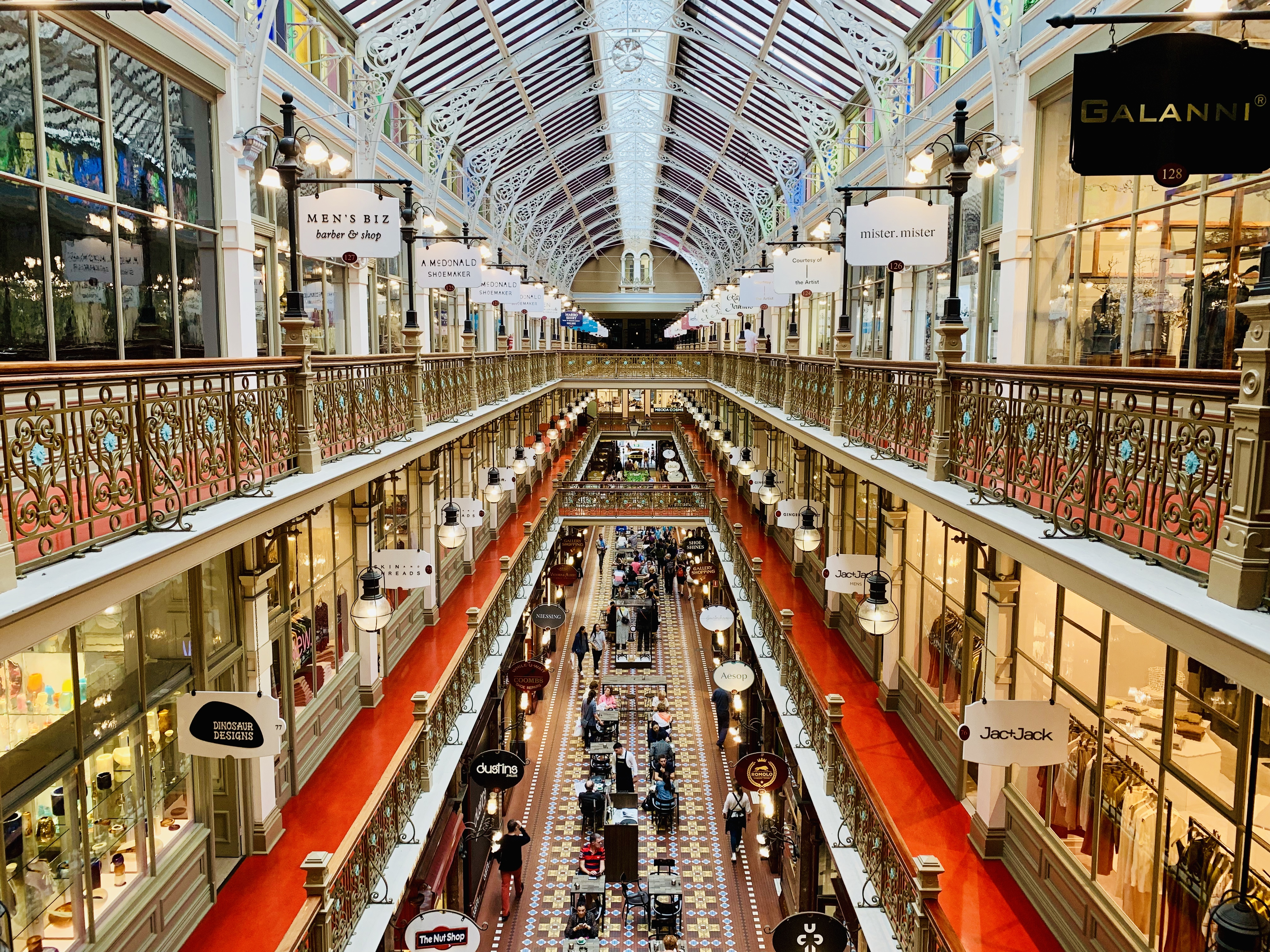
Interior of the Victorian Strand Arcade

The CBD extends about 3 km (1.9 mi) south from Sydney Cove. It is bordered by Farm Cove within the Royal Botanic Garden to the east and Darling Harbour to the west. Suburbs surrounding the CBD include Woolloomooloo and Potts Point to the east, Surry Hills and Darlinghurst to the south, Pyrmont and Ultimo to the west, and Millers Point and The Rocks to the north. Most of these suburbs measure less than 1 km^{2} (0.4 sq mi) in area. The Sydney CBD is characterised by narrow streets and thoroughfares, created in its convict beginnings.

Several localities, distinct from suburbs, exist throughout Sydney's inner reaches. Central and Circular Quay are transport hubs with ferry, rail, and bus interchanges. Chinatown, Darling Harbour, and Kings Cross are important locations for culture, tourism, and recreation. The Strand Arcade, located between Pitt Street Mall and George Street, is a historical Victorian-style shopping arcade. Opened on 1 April 1892, its shop fronts are an exact replica of the original internal shopping facades. Westfield Sydney, located beneath the Sydney Tower, is the largest shopping centre by area in Sydney.

Since the late 20th century, there has been a trend of gentrification amongst Sydney's inner suburbs. Pyrmont, located on the harbour, was redeveloped from a centre of shipping and international trade to an area of high density housing, tourist accommodation, and gambling. Originally located well outside of the city, Darlinghurst is the location of the historic Darlinghurst Gaol, manufacturing, and mixed housing. For a period it was known as an area of prostitution. The terrace-style housing has largely been retained and Darlinghurst has undergone significant gentrification since the 1980s.

Green Square is a former industrial area of Waterloo which is undergoing urban renewal worth $8 billion. On the city harbour edge, the historic suburb and wharves of Millers Point are being built up as the new area of Barangaroo. The suburb of Paddington is known for its restored terrace houses, Victoria Barracks, and shopping including the weekly Oxford Street markets.

=== Inner West ===
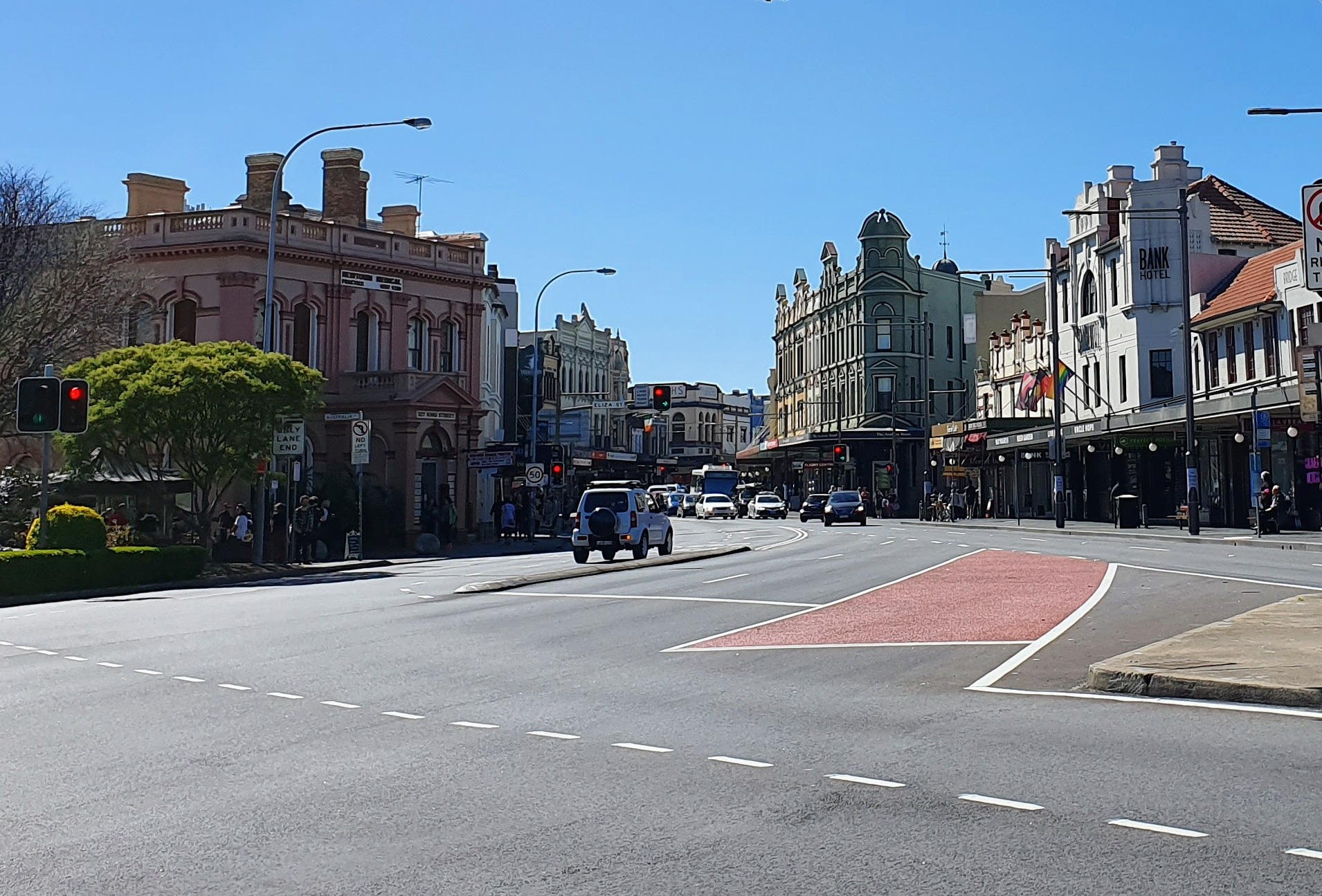
Newtown is one of the most complete Victorian and Edwardian era commercial precincts in Australia.

The Inner West generally includes the Inner West Council, Municipality of Burwood, Municipality of Strathfield, and City of Canada Bay. These span up to about 11 km west of the CBD. Historically, especially prior to the building of the Harbour Bridge, the outer suburbs of the Inner West such as Strathfield were the location of "country" estates for the colony's elites. By contrast, the inner suburbs in the Inner West, being close to transport and industry, have historically housed working-class industrial workers. These areas have undergone gentrification in the late 20th century, and many parts are now highly valued residential suburbs. As of 2021, an Inner West suburb (Strathfield) remained one of the 20 most expensive postcodes in Australia by median house price (the others were all in metropolitan Sydney, all in Northern Sydney or the Eastern Suburbs). The University of Sydney is located in this area, as well as the University of Technology Sydney and a campus of the Australian Catholic University. The Anzac Bridge spans Johnstons Bay and connects Rozelle to Pyrmont and the city, forming part of the Western Distributor.

The Inner West is today well known as the location of village commercial centres with cosmopolitan flavours, such as the "Little Italy" commercial centres of Leichhardt, Five Dock and Haberfield, "Little Portugal" in Petersham, "Little Korea" in Strathfield or "Little Shanghai" in Ashfield. Large-scale shopping centres in the area include Westfield Burwood, DFO Homebush and Birkenhead Point Outlet Centre. There is a large cosmopolitan community and nightlife hub on King Street, Newtown.

The area is serviced by Sydney Trains' T1 and T2, including the Main Suburban Line, which was the first to be constructed in New South Wales. The L1 light rail line also runs through the area. Strathfield railway station is a secondary railway hub within Sydney, and major station on the Suburban and Northern lines. It was constructed in 1876. The future Sydney Metro West will also connect this area with the City and Parramatta. The area is also serviced by the Parramatta River services of Sydney Ferries, numerous bus routes and cycleways.

=== Eastern Suburbs ===
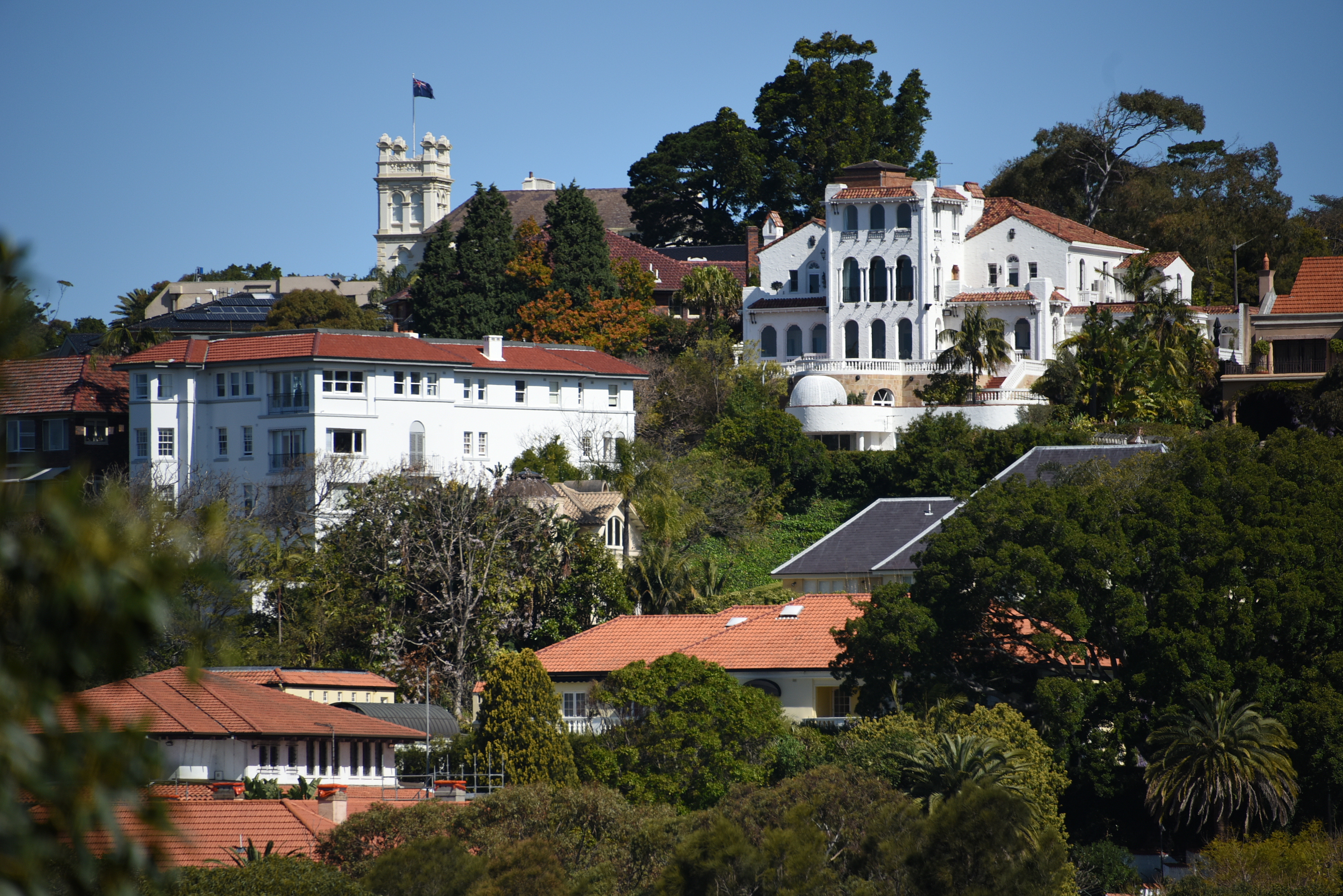
Spanish Mission residences in Bellevue Hill. Sydney's eastern suburbs are made up of some of the most expensive real estate in the country.

The Eastern Suburbs encompass the Municipality of Woollahra, the City of Randwick, the Waverley Municipal Council, and parts of the Bayside Council. They include some of the most affluent and advantaged areas in the country, with some streets being amongst the most expensive in the world. As at 2014, Wolseley Road, Point Piper, had a top price of $20,900 per square metre, making it the ninth-most expensive street in the world. More than 75% of neighbourhoods in the Electoral District of Wentworth fall under the top decile of SEIFA advantage, making it the least disadvantaged area in the country. As of 2021, of the 20 most expensive postcodes in Australia by median house price, nine were in the Eastern Suburbs.

Major landmarks include Bondi Beach, which was added to the Australian National Heritage List in 2008; and Bondi Junction, featuring a Westfield shopping centre and an estimated office workforce of 6,400 by 2035, as well as a railway station on the T4 Eastern Suburbs Line. The suburb of Randwick contains Randwick Racecourse, the Royal Hospital for Women, the Prince of Wales Hospital, Sydney Children's Hospital, and University of New South Wales Kensington Campus.

Construction of the CBD and South East Light Rail was completed in April 2020. The project aims to provide reliable and high-capacity tram services to residents in the City and South-East.

Major shopping centres in the area include Westfield Bondi Junction and Westfield Eastgardens.

=== Southern Sydney ===
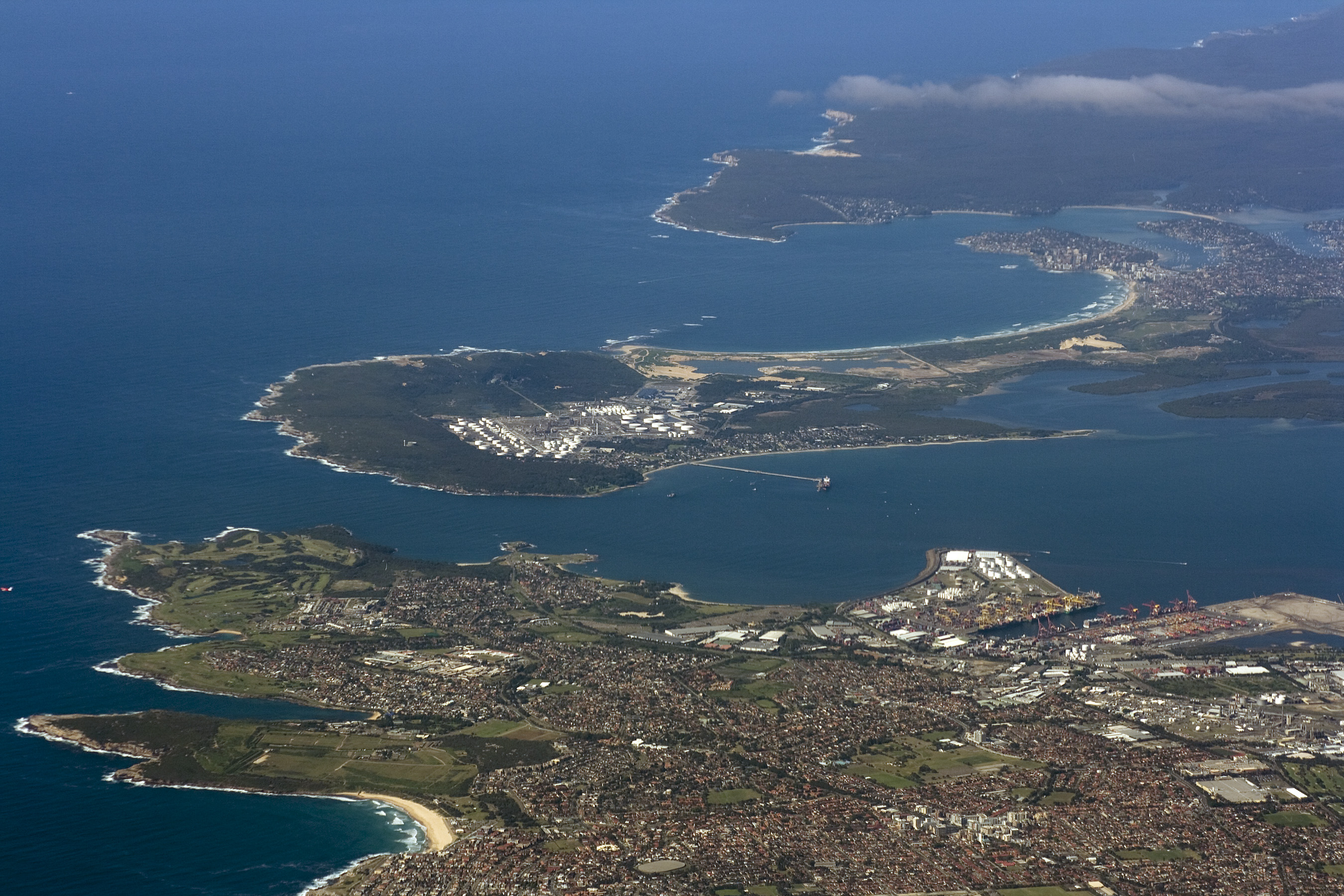
Kurnell, La Perouse, and Cronulla, along with various other suburbs, face Botany Bay.

The Southern district of Sydney includes the suburbs in the local government areas of the Georges River Council (collectively known as St George) and the Sutherland Shire (colloquially known as 'The Shire'), on the southern banks of the Georges River.

The Kurnell peninsula, near Botany Bay, is the site of the first landfall on the eastern coastline made by James Cook in 1770. La Perouse, a historic suburb named after the French navigator Jean-François de Galaup, comte de Lapérouse, is notable for its old military outpost at Bare Island and the Botany Bay National Park.

The suburb of Cronulla in southern Sydney is close to Royal National Park, Australia's oldest national park. Hurstville, a large suburb with commercial and high-rise residential buildings dominating the skyline, has become a CBD for the southern suburbs.

=== Northern Sydney ===
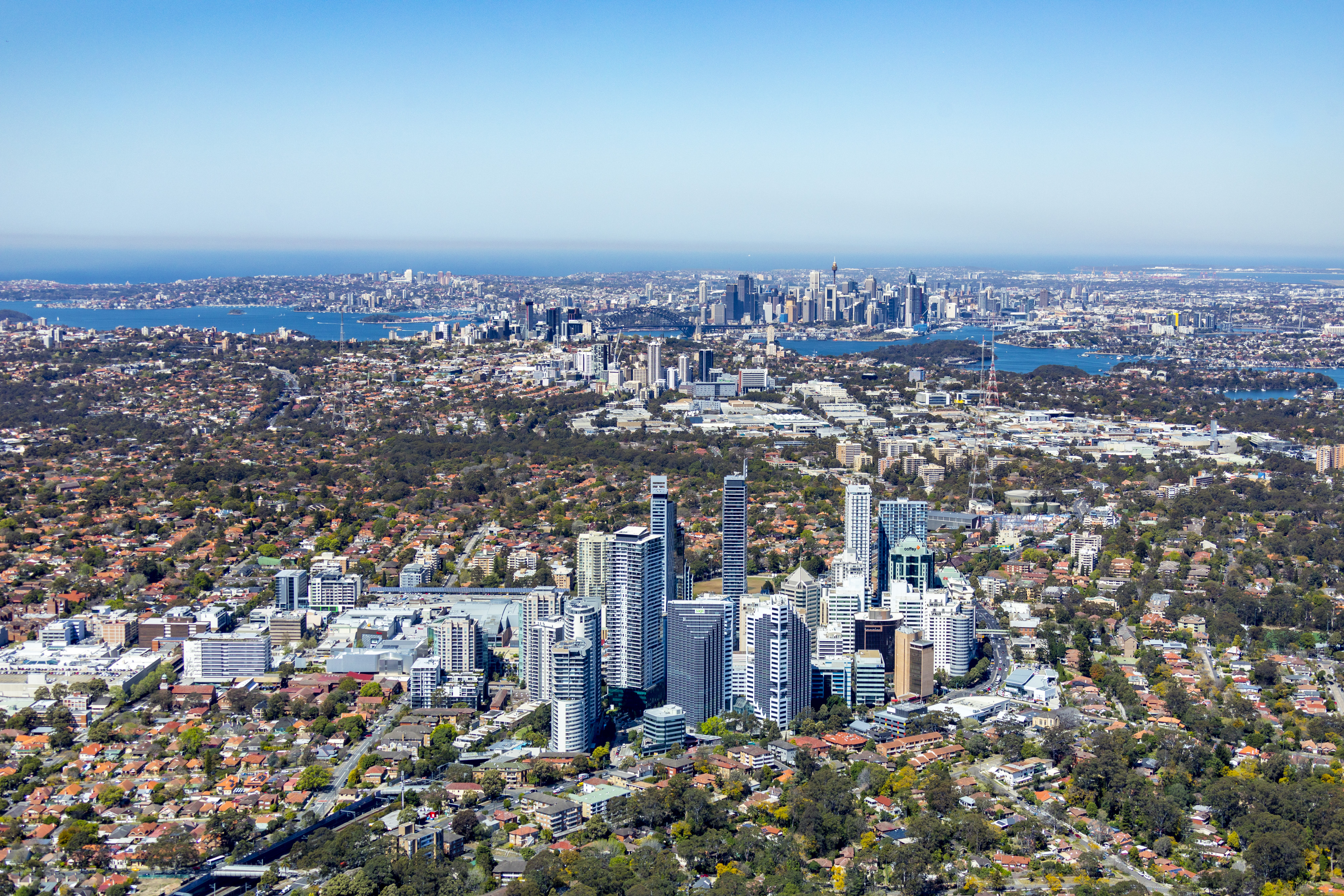
Chatswood is a major commercial district.

'Northern Sydney' includes the suburbs in the Upper North Shore, Lower North Shore and the Northern Beaches.

The Northern Suburbs include several landmarks – Macquarie University, Gladesville Bridge, Ryde Bridge, Macquarie Centre and Curzon Hall in Marsfield. This area includes suburbs in the local government areas of Hornsby Shire, Ku-ring-gai Council, City of Ryde, the Municipality of Hunter's Hill and parts of the City of Parramatta.

The North Shore includes the commercial centres of North Sydney and Chatswood. North Sydney itself consists of a large commercial centre, which contains the second largest concentration of high-rise buildings in Sydney after the CBD. North Sydney is dominated by advertising, marketing and associated trades, with many large corporations holding offices.

The Northern Beaches area includes Manly, one of Sydney's most popular holiday destinations. The region also features Sydney Heads, a series of headlands which form the entrance to Sydney Harbour. The Northern Beaches area extends south to the entrance of Port Jackson (Sydney Harbour), west to Middle Harbour and north to the entrance of Broken Bay. The 2021 Australian census found the Northern Beaches to have, in comparison with the rest of Sydney, a large British diaspora and high concentration of people with European ancestry.

As of the end of 2021, half of the 20 most expensive postcodes in Australia (by median house price) were in Northern Sydney, including four on the Northern Beaches, two on the Lower North Shore, three on the Upper North Shore, and one straddling Hunters Hill and Woolwich.

=== Hills district ===
The Hills district generally refers to the suburbs in north-western Sydney including the local government areas of The Hills Shire, parts of the City of Parramatta Council and Hornsby Shire. Actual suburbs and localities that are considered to be in the Hills District can be somewhat amorphous. For example, the Hills District Historical Society restricts its definition to the Hills Shire local government area, yet its study area extends from Parramatta to the Hawkesbury. The region is so named for its characteristically comparatively hilly topography as the Cumberland Plain lifts up, joining the Hornsby Plateau. Windsor and Old Windsor Roads are the second and third roads, respectively, laid in Australia.

On 26 May 2019, The Sydney Metro Northwest, which went from Chatswood to Tallawong, opened, with a large portion running through the Hills District, which meant the Hills District, for the first time, started having heavy rail. Before this, The Hills was served by Bus Rapid Transit.

=== Western suburbs ===
The greater western suburbs encompasses the areas of Parramatta, the sixth largest business district in Australia, settled the same year as the harbour-side colony, Bankstown, Liverpool, Penrith, and Fairfield. Covering 5,800 km^{2} (2,200 sq mi) and having an estimated population as at 2017 of 2,288,554, western Sydney has the most multicultural suburbs in the country – Cabramatta has earned the nickname "Little Saigon" due to its Vietnamese population, Fairfield has been named "Little Assyria" for its predominant Assyrian population and Harris Park is known as "Little India" with its plurality of Indian and Hindu population. The population is predominantly of a working class background, with major employment in the heavy industries and vocational trade. Toongabbie is noted for being the third mainland settlement (after Sydney and Parramatta) set up after British colonisation began in 1788, although the site of the settlement is actually in the separate suburb of Old Toongabbie.

The western suburb of Prospect, in the City of Blacktown, is home to Sydney Action Park, a water park operated by Jamberoo Action Park. Auburn Botanic Gardens, a botanical garden in Auburn, attracts thousands of visitors each year, including many from outside Australia. The greater west also includes Sydney Olympic Park, a suburb created to host the 2000 Summer Olympics, and Sydney Motorsport Park, a circuit in Eastern Creek. Prospect Hill, a historically significant ridge in the west and the only area in Sydney with ancient volcanic activity, is also listed on the State Heritage Register.

To the northwest, Featherdale Wildlife Park, a zoo in Doonside, near Blacktown, is a major tourist attraction. Sydney Zoo, opened in 2019, is another prominent zoo situated in Bungaribee. Established in 1799, the Old Government House, a historic house museum and tourist spot in Parramatta, was included in the Australian National Heritage List on 1 August 2007 and World Heritage List in 2010 (as part of the 11 penal sites constituting the Australian Convict Sites), making it the only site in greater western Sydney to be featured in such lists. The house is Australia's oldest surviving public building.

Further to the southwest is the region of Macarthur and the city of Campbelltown, a significant population centre. Until the 1990s, these regions were considered a region separate to Sydney proper. Macarthur Square, a shopping complex in Campbelltown, has become one of the largest shopping complexes in Sydney. The southwest also features Bankstown Reservoir, the oldest elevated reservoir constructed in reinforced concrete that is still in use and is listed on the State Heritage Register. The southwest is home to one of Sydney's oldest trees, the Bland Oak, which was planted in the 1840s by William Bland in Carramar.

== Urban structure ==
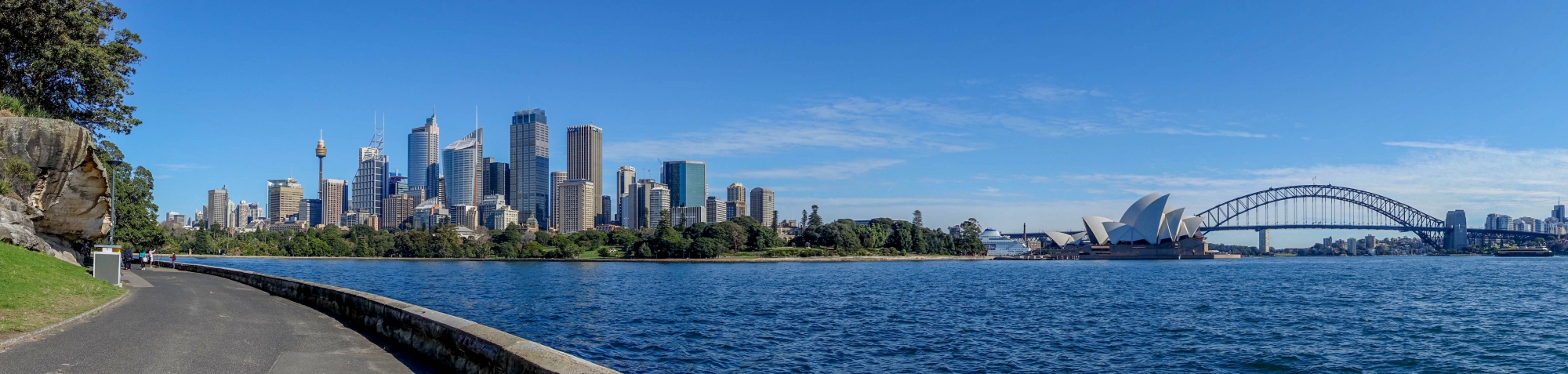
The Sydney CBD with the Opera House and Harbour Bridge. Sydney is home to the most high-rise buildings in the nation.

=== Architecture ===
The earliest structures in the colony were built to the bare minimum of standards. Governor Macquarie set ambitious targets for the design of new construction projects. The city now has a world heritage listed building, several national heritage listed buildings, and dozens of Commonwealth heritage listed buildings as evidence of the survival of Macquarie's ideals.

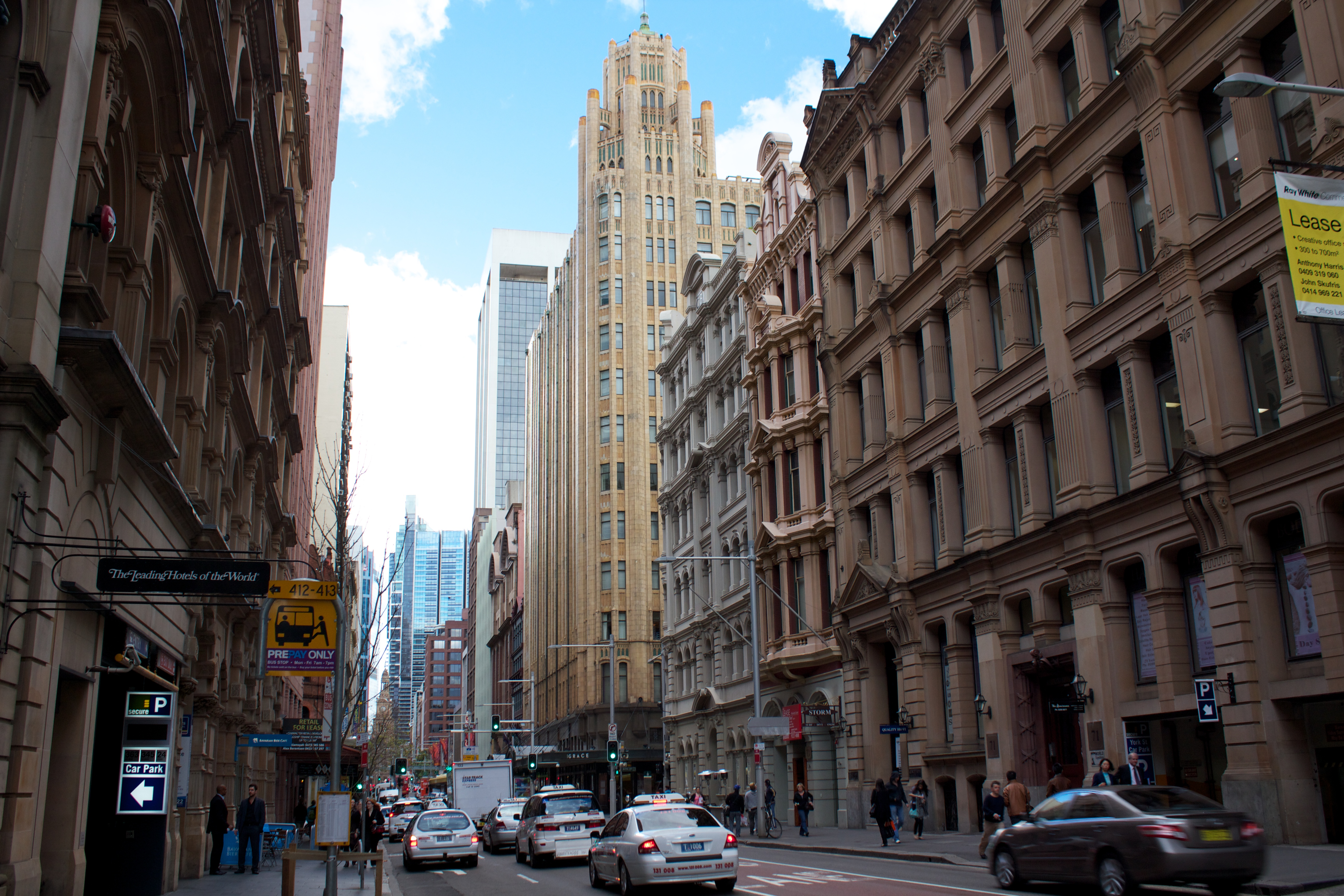
York Street is an example of a city street in Sydney with an array of intact Victorian heritage architecture.

In 1814, the governor called on a convict named Francis Greenway to design Macquarie Lighthouse. The lighthouse's Classical design earned Greenway a pardon from Macquarie in 1818 and introduced a culture of refined architecture that remains to this day. Greenway went on to design the Hyde Park Barracks in 1819 and the Georgian style St James's Church in 1824. Gothic-inspired architecture became more popular from the 1830s. John Verge's Elizabeth Bay House and St Philip's Church of 1856 were built in Gothic Revival style along with Edward Blore's Government House of 1845. Kirribilli House, completed in 1858, and St Andrew's Cathedral, Australia's oldest cathedral, are rare examples of Victorian Gothic construction.

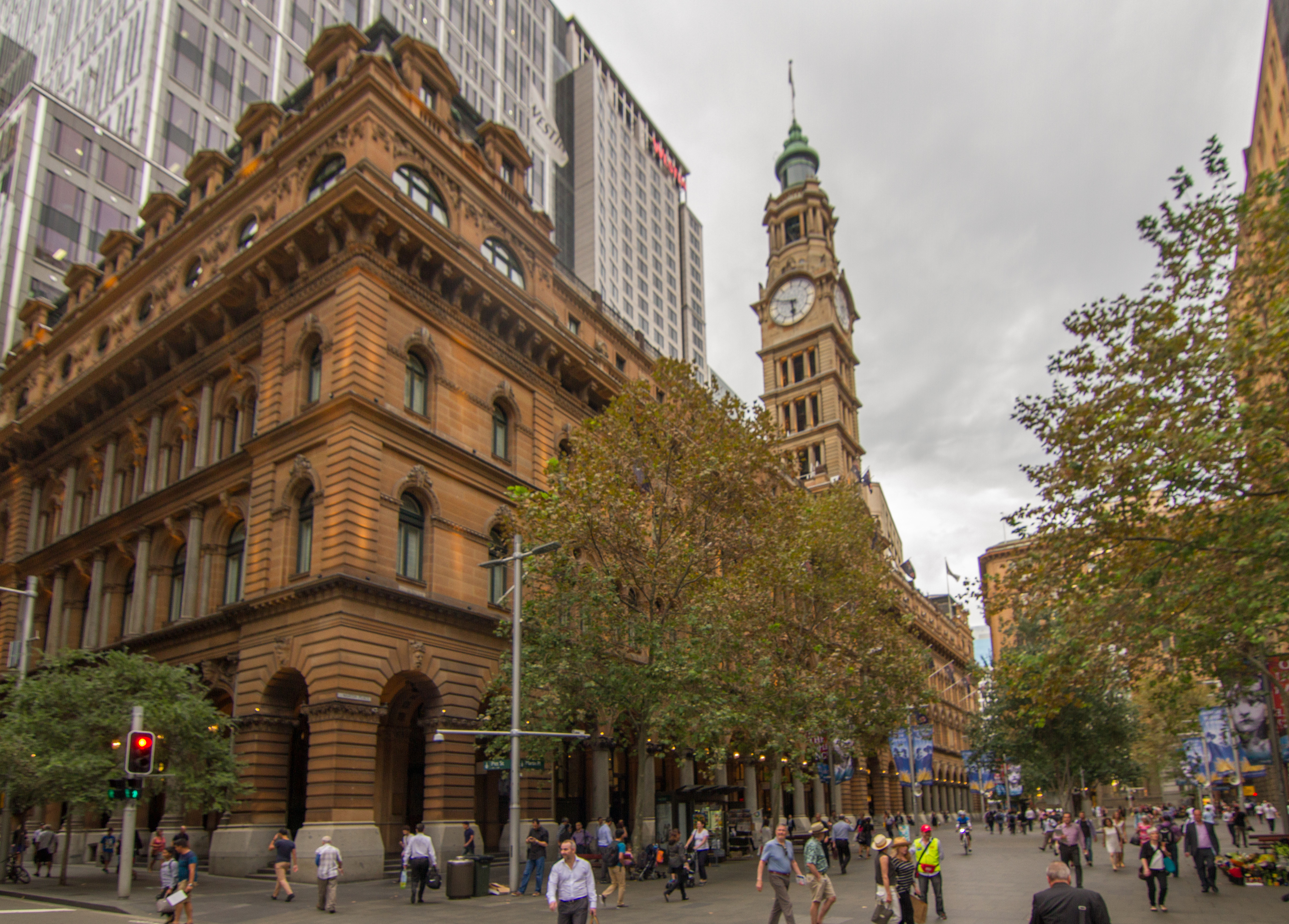
General Post Office

From the late 1850s there was a shift towards Classical architecture. Mortimer Lewis designed the Australian Museum in 1857. The General Post Office, completed in 1891 in Victorian Free Classical style, was designed by James Barnet. Barnet also oversaw the 1883 reconstruction of Greenway's Macquarie Lighthouse. Customs House was built in 1844. The neo-Classical and French Second Empire style Town Hall was completed in 1889. Romanesque designs gained favour from the early 1890s. Sydney Technical College was completed in 1893 using both Romanesque Revival and Queen Anne approaches. The Queen Victoria Building was designed in Romanesque Revival fashion by George McRae; completed in 1898, it accommodates 200 shops across its three storeys.

As the wealth of the settlement increased and Sydney developed into a metropolis after Federation in 1901, its buildings became taller. Sydney's first tower was Culwulla Chambers which topped out at 50 m (160 ft) making 12 floors. The Commercial Traveller's Club, built in 1908, was of similar height at 10 floors. It was built in a brick stone veneer and demolished in 1972. This heralded a change in Sydney's cityscape and with the lifting of height restrictions in the 1960s there came a surge of high-rise construction.

The Great Depression had a tangible influence on Sydney's architecture. New structures became more restrained with far less ornamentation. The most notable architectural feat of this period is the Harbour Bridge. Its steel arch was designed by John Bradfield and completed in 1932. A total of 39,000 tonnes of structural steel span the 503 m (1,650 ft) between Milsons Point and Dawes Point.

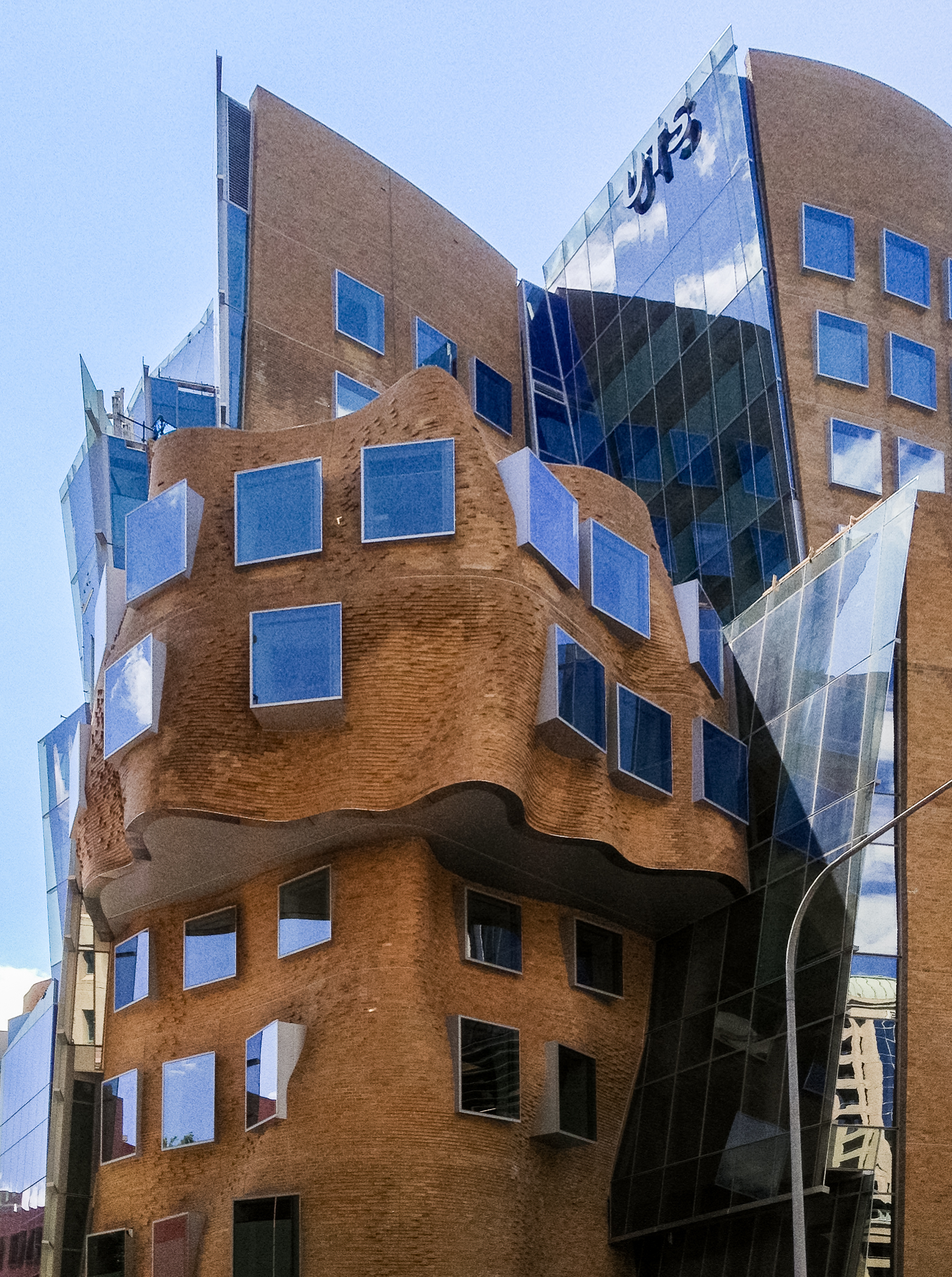
Frank Gehry's Dr Chau Chak Wing Building

Modern and International architecture came to Sydney from the 1940s. Since its completion in 1973 the city's Opera House has become a World Heritage Site and one of the world's most renowned pieces of Modern design. Jørn Utzon was awarded the Pritzker Prize in 2003 for his work on the Opera House. Sydney is home to Australia's first building by renowned Canadian-American architect Frank Gehry, the Dr Chau Chak Wing Building (2015). An entrance from The Goods Line–a pedestrian pathway and former railway line–is located on the eastern border of the site.

Contemporary buildings in the CBD include Citigroup Centre, Aurora Place, Chifley Tower, the Reserve Bank building, Deutsche Bank Place, MLC Centre, and Capita Centre. The tallest structure is Sydney Tower, designed by Donald Crone and completed in 1981. Due to the proximity of Sydney Airport, a maximum height restriction was imposed, now sitting at 330 metres (1083 feet). Green bans and heritage overlays have been in place since at least 1977 to protect Sydney's heritage after controversial demolitions in the 1970s.

=== Housing ===
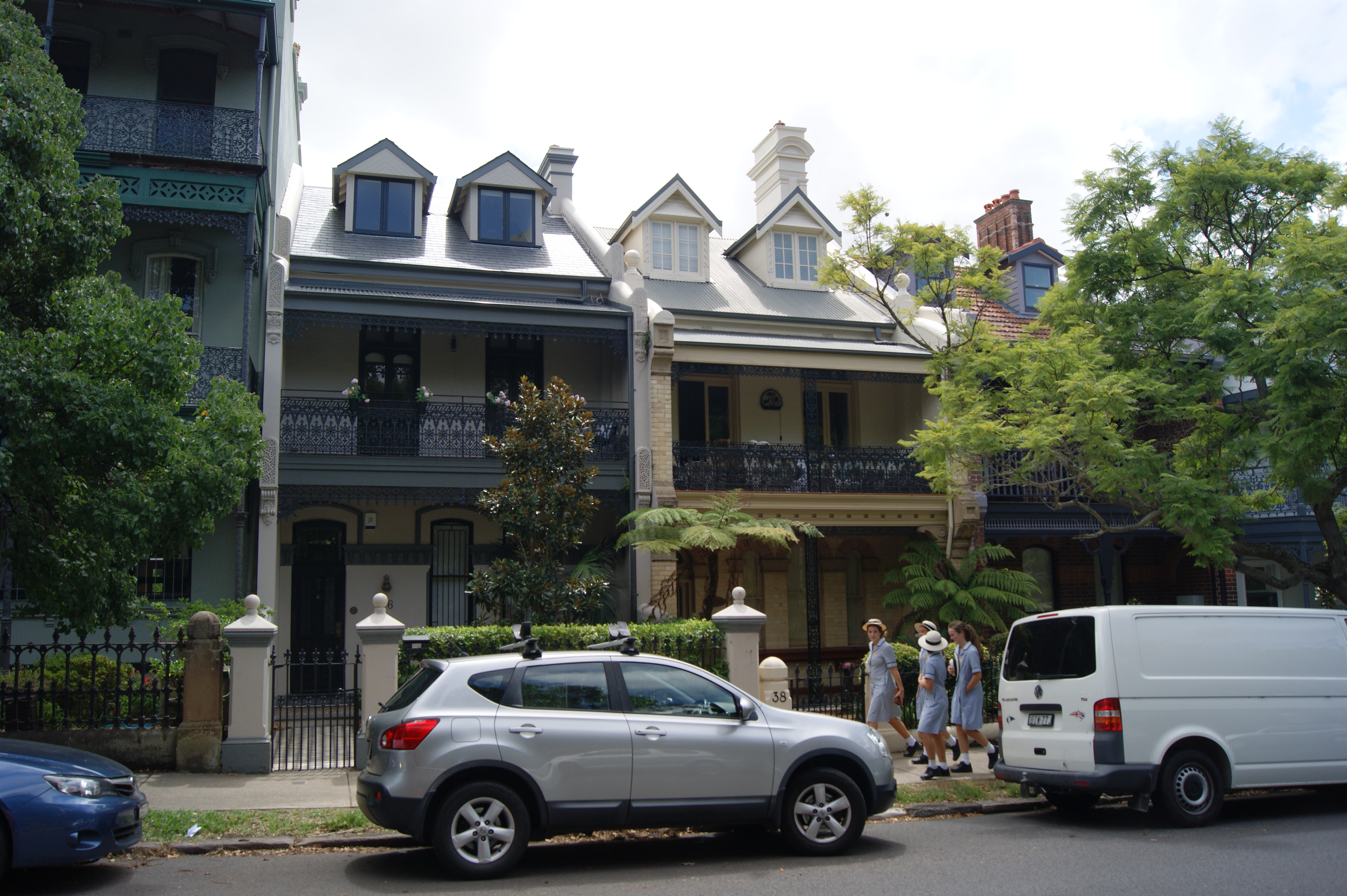
Terraces in Kirribilli

Sydney surpasses both New York City and Paris real estate prices, having some of the most expensive in the world. The city remains Australia's most expensive housing market, with the median house price at $1,751,728 as of October 2025.

There were 1.83 million dwellings in Sydney in 2021 including 900,000 (54%) detached houses, 218,000 (13%) semi-detached terrace houses and 550,000 (33%) units and apartments. Whilst terrace houses are common in the inner city areas, detached houses dominate the landscape in the outer suburbs. Due to environmental and economic pressures, there has been a noted trend towards denser housing, with a 30% increase in the number of apartments between 1996 and 2006. Public housing in Sydney is managed by the Government of New South Wales. Suburbs with large concentrations of public housing include Claymore, Macquarie Fields, Waterloo, and Mount Druitt.

A range of heritage housing styles can be found throughout Sydney. Terrace houses are found in the inner suburbs such as Paddington, The Rocks, Potts Point and Balmain, many of which have been the subject of gentrification. These terraces, particularly those in suburbs such as The Rocks, were historically home to Sydney's miners and labourers. In the present day, terrace houses now make up some of the most valuable real estate in the city. Surviving large mansions from the Victorian era are mostly found in the oldest suburbs, such as Double Bay, Darling Point, Rose Bay and Strathfield.

Federation homes, constructed around the time of Federation in 1901, are located in a large number of suburbs that developed thanks to the arrival of railways in the late 19th century, such as Penshurst and Turramurra, and in large-scale planned "garden suburbs" such as Haberfield. Workers cottages are found in Surry Hills, Redfern, and Balmain. California bungalows are common in Ashfield, Concord, and Beecroft. Larger modern homes are predominantly found in the outer suburbs, such as Stanhope Gardens, Kellyville Ridge, Bella Vista to the northwest, Bossley Park, Abbotsbury, and Cecil Hills to the west, and Hoxton Park, Harrington Park, and Oran Park to the southwest.

=== Parks and open spaces ===
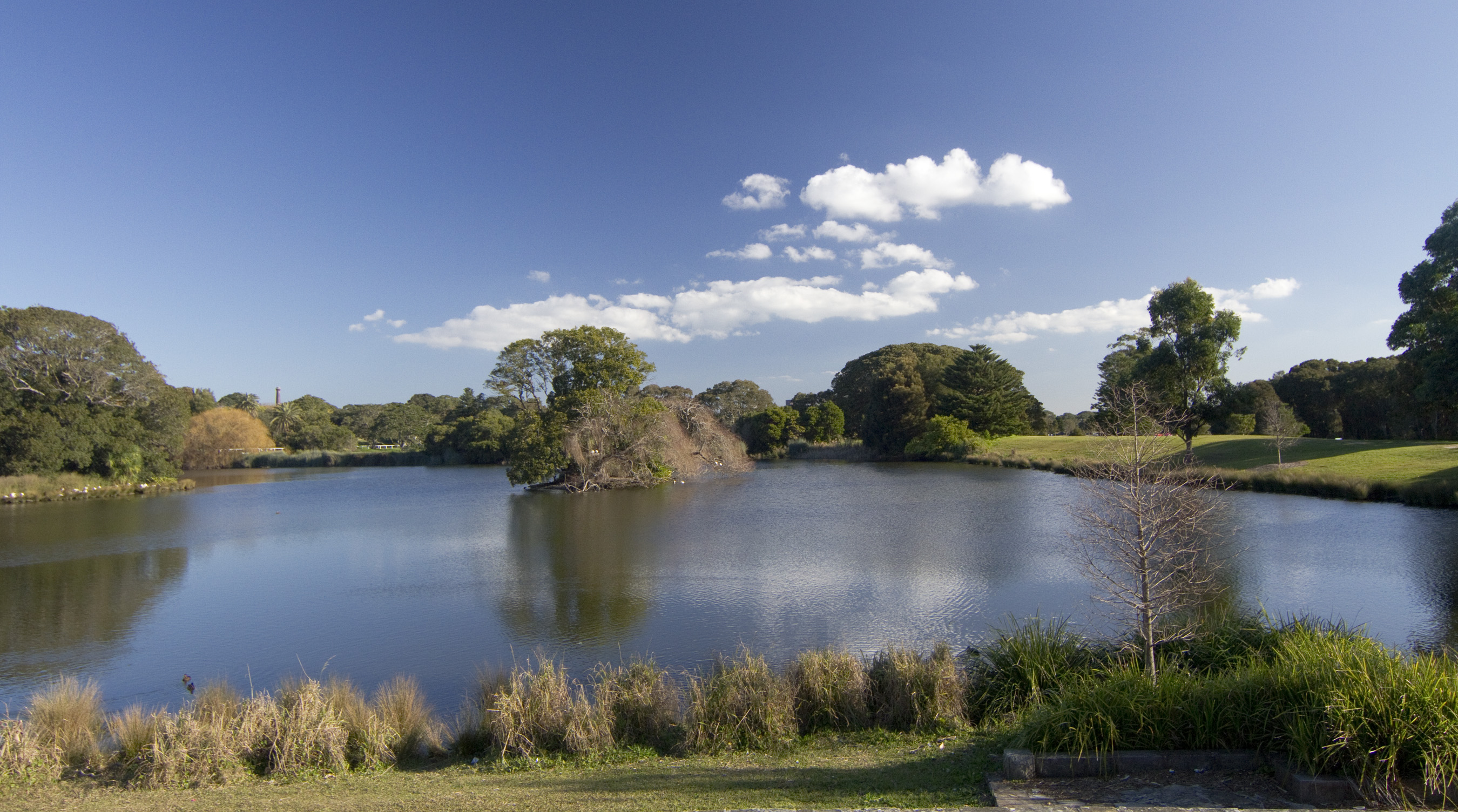
The Centennial Parklands is the largest park in the City of Sydney, comprising 189 ha (470 acres).

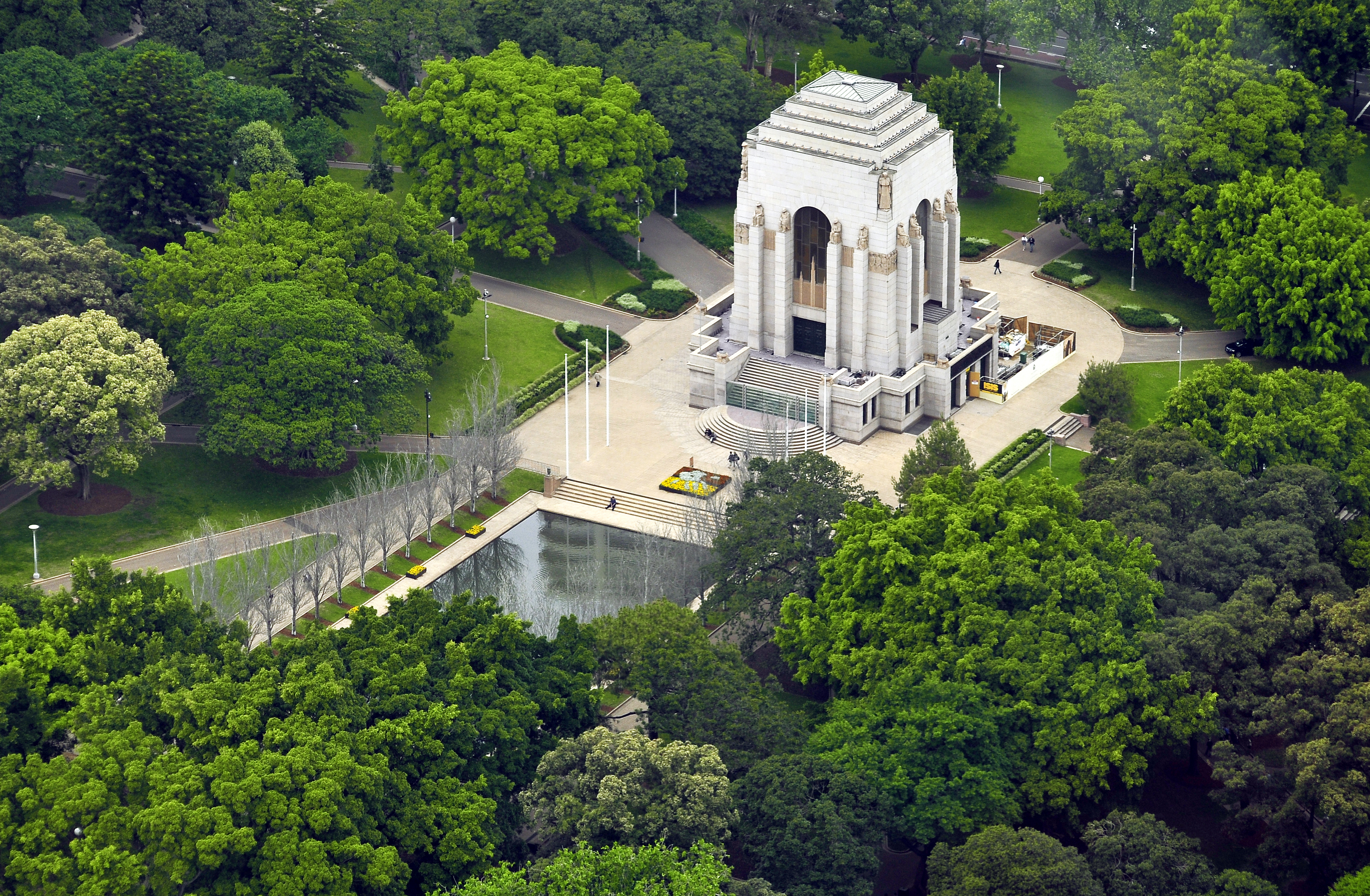
The Anzac War Memorial in Hyde Park is a public memorial dedicated to the achievement of the Australian Imperial Force of World War I.

The Anzac War Memorial in Hyde Park is a public memorial dedicated to the Australian Imperial Force of World War I.

The Royal Botanic Garden is the most iconic green space in the region, hosting both scientific and leisure activities. There are 15 separate parks under the City administration. Parks within the city centre include Hyde Park, The Domain and Prince Alfred Park.

The Centennial Parklands is the largest park in the City of Sydney, comprising 189 ha (470 acres).

The inner suburbs include Centennial Park and Moore Park in the east (both within the City of Sydney local government area), while the outer suburbs contain Sydney Park and Royal National Park in the south, Ku-ring-gai Chase National Park in the north, and Western Sydney Parklands in the west, which is one of the largest urban parks in the world. The Royal National Park was proclaimed in 1879 and with 13,200 ha (51 sq mi) is the second oldest national park in the world.

Hyde Park is the oldest parkland in the country. The largest park in the Sydney metropolitan area is Ku-ring-gai Chase National Park, established in 1894 with an area of 15,400 ha (59 sq mi). It is regarded for its well-preserved records of indigenous habitation – more than 800 rock engravings, cave drawings and middens.

The area now known as The Domain was set aside by Governor Arthur Phillip in 1788 as his private reserve. Under the orders of Macquarie the land to the immediate north of The Domain became the Royal Botanic Garden in 1816. This makes them the oldest botanic garden in Australia. The Gardens host scientific research with herbarium collections, a library and laboratories. The two parks have a total area of 64 ha (0.2 sq mi) with 8,900 individual plant species and receive over 3.5 million annual visits.

To the south of The Domain is Hyde Park, the oldest public parkland in Australia which measures 16.2 ha (0.1 sq mi). Its location was used for both relaxation and grazing of animals from the earliest days of the colony. Macquarie dedicated it in 1810 for the "recreation and amusement of the inhabitants of the town" and named it in honour of Hyde Park in London.

== Economy ==
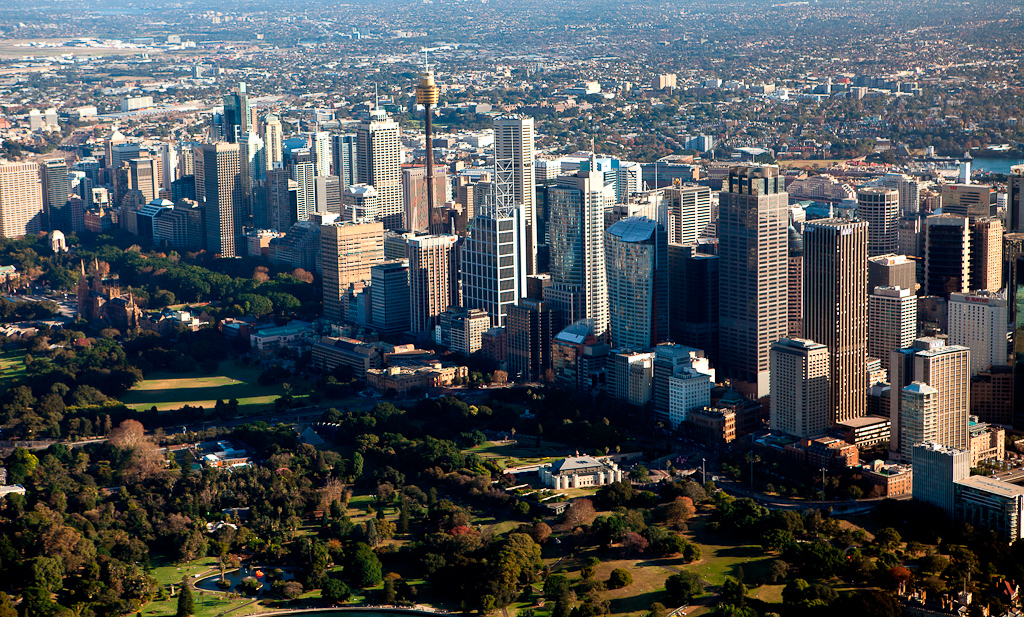
The central business district. Sydney is the financial and economic centre of Australia, having the largest economy and contributing a quarter of Australia's total GDP.

Researchers from Loughborough University have ranked Sydney amongst the top ten world cities that are highly integrated into the global economy. The Global Economic Power Index ranks Sydney eleventh in the world. The Global Cities Index recognises it as fourteenth in the world based on global engagement. There is a significant concentration of foreign banks and multinational corporations in Sydney and the city is promoted as Australia's financial capital and one of the Asia–Pacific's leading financial hubs.

The prevailing economic theory during early colonial days was mercantilism, as it was throughout most of Western Europe. The economy struggled at first due to difficulties in cultivating the land and the lack of a stable monetary system. Governor Macquarie created two coins from every Spanish silver dollar in circulation. The economy was capitalist in nature by the 1840s as the proportion of free settlers increased, the maritime and wool industries flourished, and the powers of the East India Company were curtailed.

Wheat, gold, and other minerals became export industries towards the end of the 1800s. Significant capital began to flow into the city from the 1870s to finance roads, railways, bridges, docks, courthouses, schools and hospitals. Protectionist policies after federation allowed for the creation of a manufacturing industry which became the city's largest employer by the 1920s. These same policies helped to relieve the effects of the Great Depression during which the unemployment rate in New South Wales reached as high as 32%. From the 1960s onwards Parramatta gained recognition as the city's second CBD and finance and tourism became major industries and sources of employment.

Sydney's nominal gross domestic product was AU$490 billion (US$368.42 billion) in 2021. The financial and insurance services industry accounts for 18.1% of gross product, ahead of professional services with 9% and manufacturing with 7.2%. The creative and technology sectors are also focus industries for the City of Sydney and represented 9% and 11% of its economic output in 2012.

=== Businesses ===
There were 451,000 businesses based in Sydney in 2011, including 48% of the top 500 companies in Australia and two-thirds of the regional headquarters of multinational corporations. Global companies are attracted to the city in part because its time zone spans the closing of business in North America and the opening of business in Europe. Most foreign companies in Sydney maintain significant sales and service functions but comparably less production, research, and development capabilities. There are 283 multinational companies with regional offices in Sydney.

=== Domestic economics ===
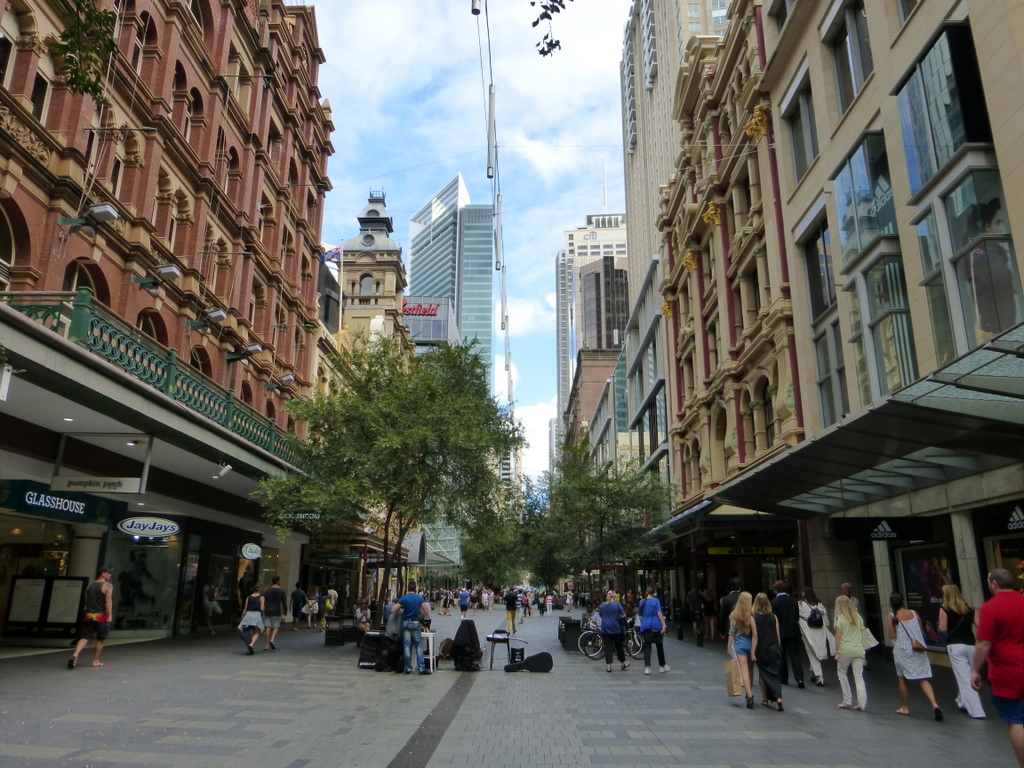
Pitt Street, a major street in the CBD, runs from Circular Quay in the north to Waterloo in the south, and is home to many large high-end retailers.

Sydney has been ranked between the fifteenth and the fifth most expensive city in the world and is the most expensive city in Australia. Of the 15 categories only measured by UBS in 2012, workers receive the seventh highest wage levels of 77 cities in the world. Working residents of Sydney work an average of 1,846 hours per annum with 15 days of leave.

The labour force of Greater Sydney Region in 2016 was 2,272,722 with a participation rate of 61.6%. It comprised 61.2% full-time workers, 30.9% part-time workers, and 6.0% unemployed individuals. The largest reported occupations are professionals, clerical and administrative workers, managers, technicians and trades workers, and community and personal service workers. The largest industries by employment across Greater Sydney are Health Care and Social Assistance (11.6%), Professional Services (9.8%), Retail Trade (9.3%), Construction (8.2%), Education and Training (8.0%), Accommodation and Food Services (6.7%), and Financial and Insurance Services (6.6%). The Professional Services and Financial and Insurance Services industries account for 25.4% of employment within the City of Sydney.

In 2016, 57.6% of working-age residents had a weekly income of less than $1,000 and 14.4% had a weekly income of $1,750 or more. The median weekly income for the same period was $719 for individuals, $1,988 for families, and $1,750 for households.

Unemployment in the City of Sydney averaged 4.6% for the decade to 2013, much lower than the current rate of unemployment in Western Sydney of 7.3%. Western Sydney continues to struggle to create jobs to meet its population growth despite the development of commercial centres like Parramatta. Each day about 200,000 commuters travel from Western Sydney to the CBD and suburbs in the east and north of the city.

Home ownership in Sydney was less common than renting prior to the Second World War but this trend has since reversed. Median house prices have increased by an average of 8.6% per annum since 1970. The median house price in March 2014 was $630,000. The primary cause of rising prices is the increasing cost of land and scarcity. 31.6% of dwellings in Sydney are rented, 30.4% are owned outright and 34.8% are owned with a mortgage. 11.8% of mortgagees in 2011 had monthly loan repayments of less than $1,000 and 82.9% had monthly repayments of $1,000 or more. 44.9% of renters for the same period had weekly rent of less than $350 whilst 51.7% had weekly rent of $350 or more. The median weekly rent in Sydney in 2011 was $450.

=== Financial services ===
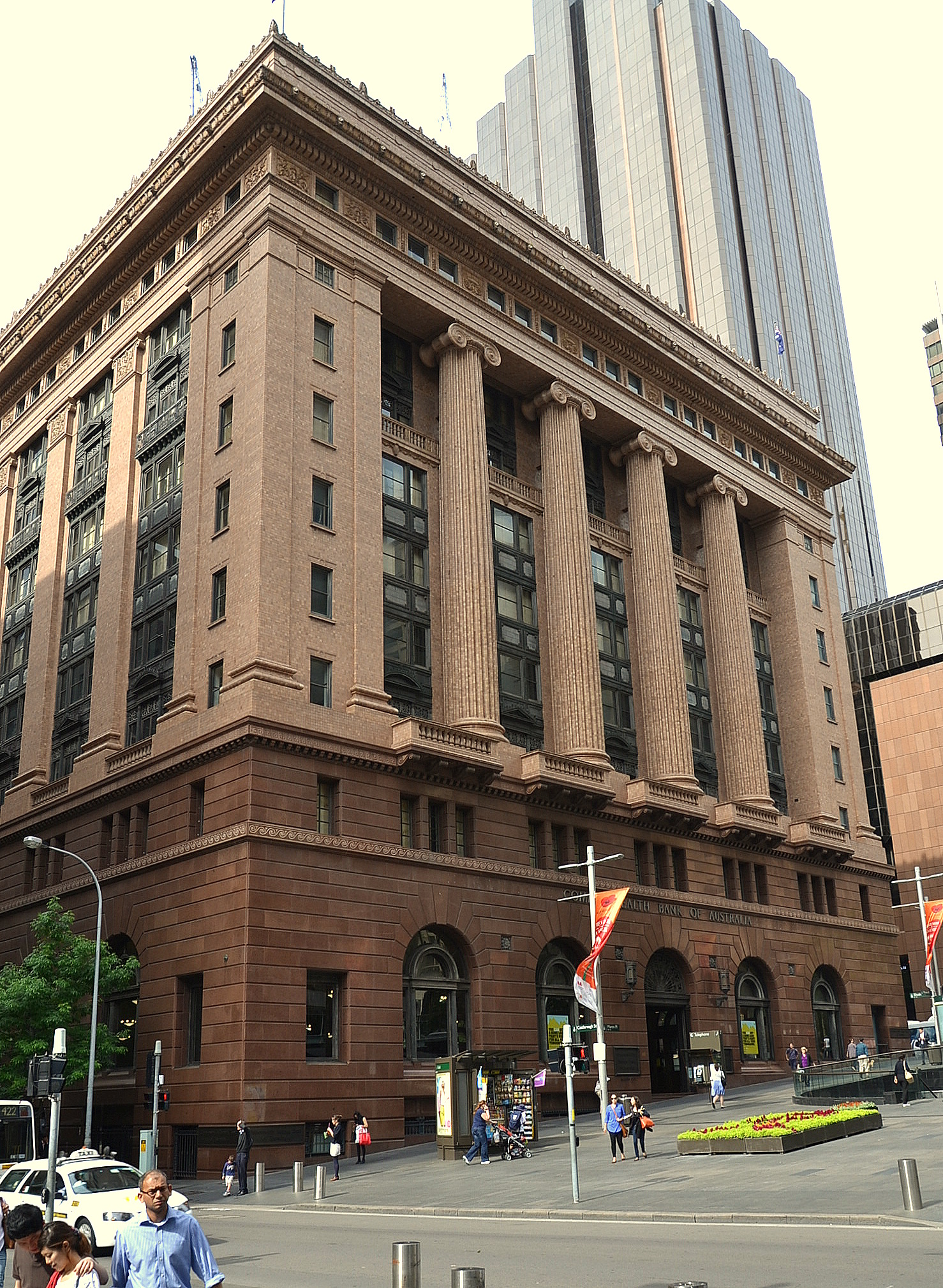
State Savings Bank

Macquarie gave a charter in 1817 to form the first bank in Australia, the Bank of New South Wales. New private banks opened throughout the 1800s but the financial system was unstable. Bank collapses were frequent and a crisis point was reached in 1893 when 12 banks failed.

The Bank of New South Wales exists to this day as Westpac. The Commonwealth Bank of Australia was formed in Sydney in 1911 and began to issue notes backed by the resources of the nation. It was replaced in this role in 1959 by the Reserve Bank of Australia, also based in Sydney. The Australian Securities Exchange began operating in 1987 and with a market capitalisation of $1.6 trillion is now one of the ten largest exchanges in the world.

The Financial and Insurance Services industry now constitutes 43% of the economic product of the City of Sydney. Sydney makes up half of Australia's finance sector and has been promoted by consecutive Commonwealth Governments as the Asia–Pacific's leading financial centre. In the 2017 Global Financial Centres Index, Sydney was ranked as having the eighth most competitive financial centre in the world.

In 1985 the Federal Government granted 16 banking licences to foreign banks and now 40 of the 43 foreign banks operating in Australia are based in Sydney, including the People's Bank of China, Bank of America, Citigroup, UBS, Mizuho Bank, Bank of China, Banco Santander, Credit Suisse, Standard Chartered, State Street, HSBC, Deutsche Bank, Barclays, Royal Bank of Canada, Société Générale, Royal Bank of Scotland, Sumitomo Mitsui, ING Group, BNP Paribas, and Investec.

=== Manufacturing ===
Sydney has been a manufacturing city since the 1920s. By 1961 the industry accounted for 39% of all employment and by 1970 over 30% of all Australian manufacturing jobs were in Sydney. Its status has declined in recent decades, making up 12.6% of employment in 2001 and 8.5% in 2011. Between 1970 and 1985 there was a loss of 180,000 manufacturing jobs. Despite this, Sydney still overtook Melbourne as the largest manufacturing centre in Australia in the 2010s, with a manufacturing output of $21.7 billion in 2013. Observers have credited Sydney's focus on the domestic market and high-tech manufacturing for its resilience against the high Australian dollar of the early 2010s. The Smithfield-Wetherill Park Industrial Estate in Western Sydney is the largest industrial estate in the Southern Hemisphere and is the centre of manufacturing and distribution in the region.

=== Tourism and international education ===
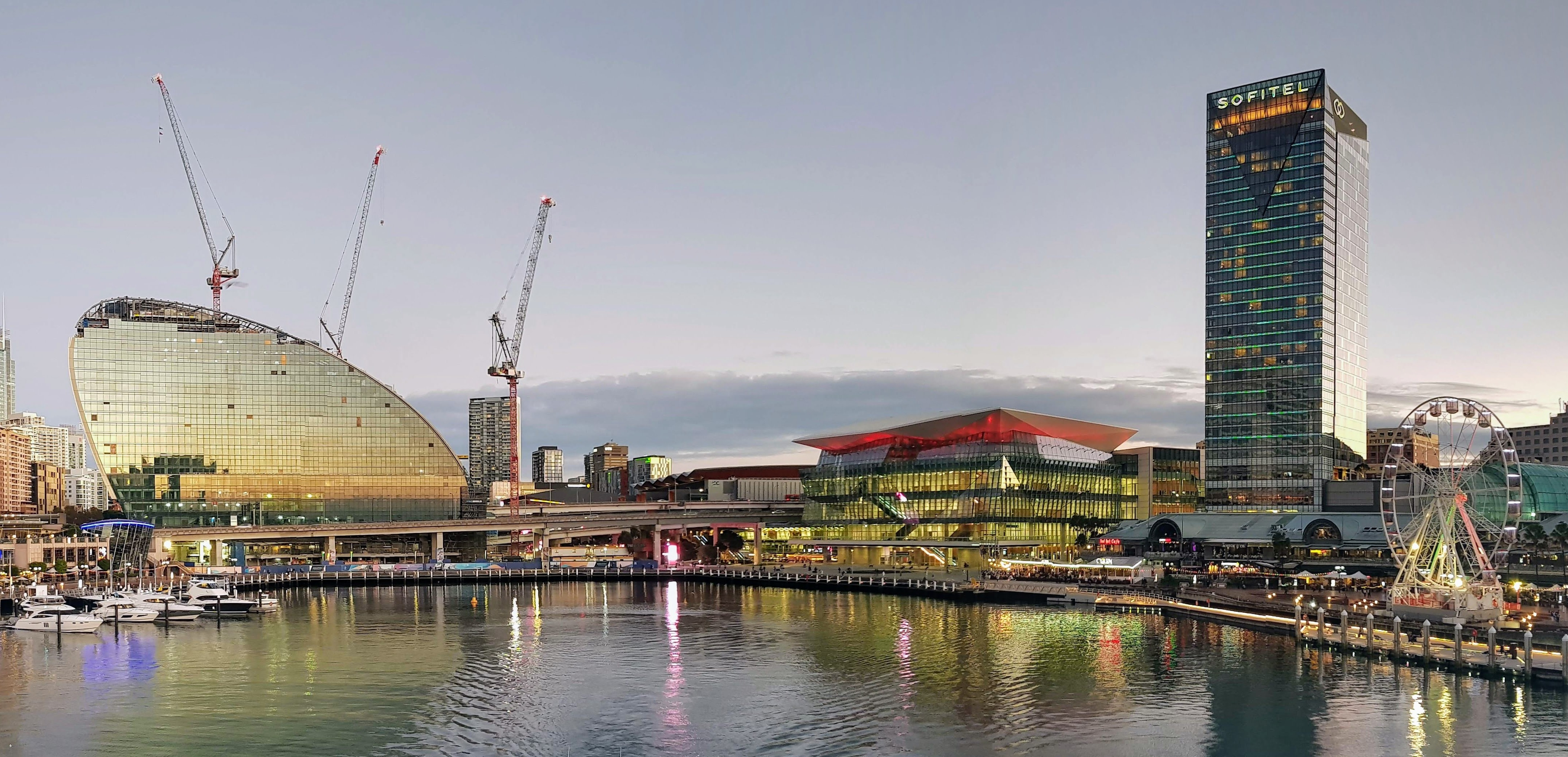
Darling Harbour is a major entertainment and tourism precinct.

Sydney is a gateway to Australia for many international visitors and ranks among the top sixty most visited cities in the world. It has hosted over 2.8 million international visitors in 2013, or nearly half of all international visits to Australia. These visitors spent 59 million nights in the city and a total of $5.9 billion. The countries of origin in descending order were China, New Zealand, the United Kingdom, the United States, South Korea, Japan, Singapore, Germany, Hong Kong, and India.

The city also received 8.3 million domestic overnight visitors in 2013 who spent a total of $6 billion. 26,700 workers in the City of Sydney were directly employed by tourism in 2011. There were 480,000 visitors and 27,500 people staying overnight each day in 2012. On average, the tourism industry contributes $36 million to the city's economy per day.

Popular destinations include the Sydney Opera House, the Sydney Harbour Bridge, Watsons Bay, The Rocks, Sydney Tower, Darling Harbour, the Royal Botanic Garden, the Australian Museum, the Museum of Contemporary Art, the Art Gallery of New South Wales, the Queen Victoria Building, Sea Life Sydney Aquarium, Taronga Zoo, Bondi Beach, Luna Park and Sydney Olympic Park.

Major developmental projects designed to increase Sydney's tourism sector include a casino and hotel at Barangaroo and the redevelopment of East Darling Harbour, which involves a new exhibition and convention centre, now Australia's largest.

Sydney is the highest-ranking city in the world for international students. More than 50,000 international students study at the city's universities and a further 50,000 study at its vocational and English language schools. International education contributes $1.6 billion to the local economy and creates demand for 4,000 local jobs each year.

=== Housing affordability ===
In 2023, Sydney was ranked the least affordable city to buy a house in Australia and the second least affordable city in the world, after Hong Kong, with the average Sydney house price in late 2023 costing A$1.59 million, and the average unit price costing A$795,000. As of early 2024, Sydney is often described in the media as having a housing shortage, or suffering a housing crisis.

== Demographics ==
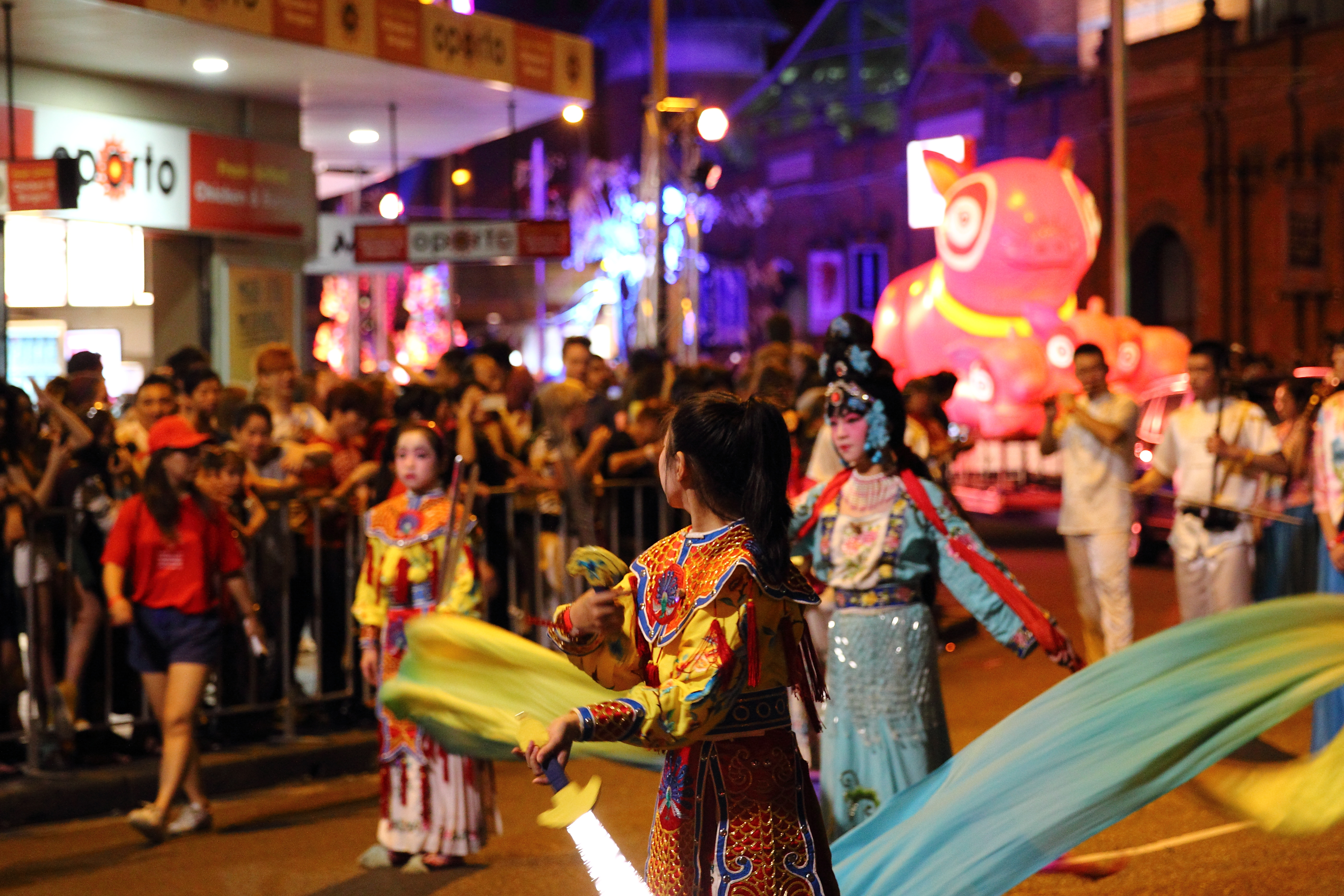
Chinese New Year celebrations in Chinatown. Sydney is home to the nation's largest population of Chinese Australians.

The population of Sydney in 1788 was less than 1,000. With convict transportation it almost tripled in ten years to 2,953. For each decade since 1961 the population has increased by more than 250,000. The 2021 census recorded the population of Greater Sydney as 5,231,150. The Australian Treasury expects the population will grow to 6.5 million in 2033–34. The four most densely populated suburbs in Australia are located in Sydney with each having more than 13,000 residents per square kilometre (33,700 residents per square mile). Between 1971 and 2018, Sydney experienced a net loss of 716,832 people to the rest of Australia, but its population grew due to overseas arrivals and a healthy birth rate.

The median age of Sydney residents is 37 and 14.8% of people are 65 or older. 48.6% of Sydney's population is married whilst 36.7% have never been married. 49.0% of families are couples with children, 34.4% are couples without children, and 14.8% are single-parent families.

=== Ancestry and immigration ===
Country of birth (2021)
Birthplace (Note: In accordance with the Australian Bureau of Statistics source, England, Scotland, Mainland China and the Special Administrative Regions of Hong Kong and Macau are listed separately.)	Population
Australia	2,970,737
Mainland China	238,316
India	187,810
England	153,052
Vietnam	93,778
Philippines	91,339
New Zealand	85,493
Lebanon	61,620
Nepal	59,055
Iraq	52,604
South Korea	50,702
Hong Kong SAR	46,182
South Africa	39,564
Italy	38,762
Indonesia	35,413
Malaysia	35,002
Fiji	34,197
Pakistan	31,025

At the 2021 census, the most common ancestries were:

- English (21.8%)
- Australian (20.4%) (Note: The Australian Bureau of Statistics has stated that most who nominate "Australian" as their ancestry are part of the Anglo-Celtic group.)
- Chinese (11.6%)
- Irish (7.2%)
- Scottish (5.6%)
- Indian (4.9%)
- Italian (4.3%)
- Lebanese (3.5%)
- Filipino (2.7%)
- Greek (2.6%)
- Vietnamese (2.5%)
- German (2.2%)
- Korean (1.4%)
- Nepalese (1.4%)
- Australian Aboriginal (1.4%)
- Maltese (1.1%)

At the 2021 census, 40.5% of Sydney's population was born overseas. Foreign countries of birth with the greatest representation are mainland China, India, England, Vietnam, Philippines and New Zealand.

At the 2021 census, 1.7% of Sydney's population identified as being Indigenous — Aboriginal Australians and Torres Strait Islanders. (Note: Indigenous identification is separate to the ancestry question on the Australian Census and persons identifying as Aboriginal or Torres Strait Islander may identify any ancestry.)

=== Language ===
42% of households in Sydney use a language other than English, with the most common being Mandarin (5%), Arabic (4.2%), Cantonese (2.8%), Vietnamese (2.2%) and Hindi (1.5%).

=== Religion ===
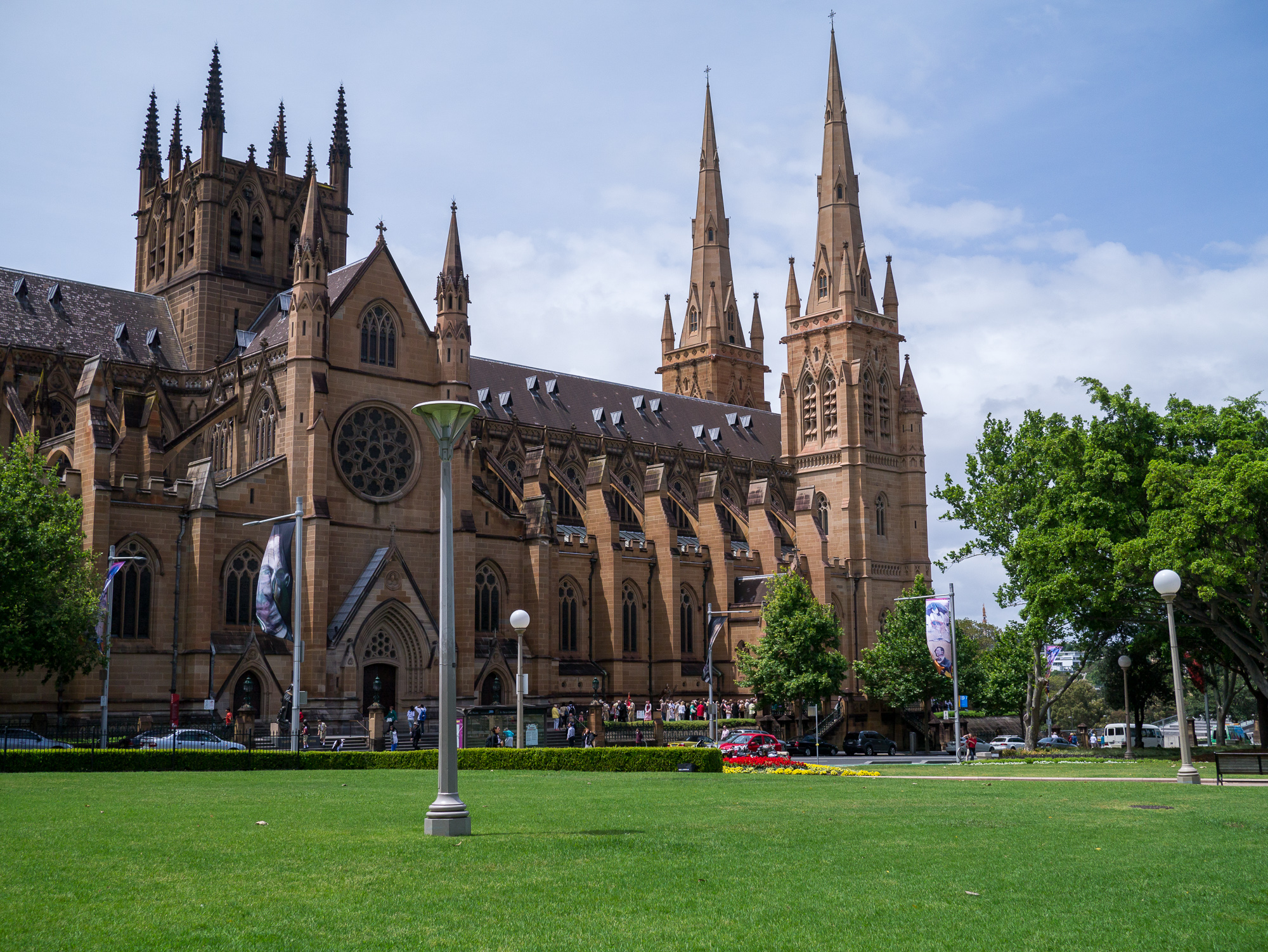
St Mary's Cathedral is the cathedral church of the Roman Catholic Archdiocese of Sydney.

In 2021, Christianity was the largest religious affiliation at 46%, the largest denominations of which were Catholicism at 23.1% and Anglicanism at 9.2%. 30.3% of Sydney residents identified as having no religion. The most common non-Christian religious affiliations were Islam (6.3%), Hinduism (4.8%), Buddhism (3.8%), Sikhism (0.7%), and Judaism (0.7%). About 500 people identified with traditional Aboriginal religions.

The Church of England was the only recognised church before Governor Macquarie appointed official Catholic chaplains in 1820. Macquarie also ordered the construction of churches such as St Matthew's, St Luke's, St James's, and St Andrew's. Religious groups, alongside secular institutions, have played a significant role in education, health and charitable services throughout Sydney's history.

=== Crime ===
Crime in Sydney is low, with The Independent ranking Sydney as the fifth safest city in the world in 2019. However, drug use is a significant problem. Methamphetamine is heavily consumed compared to other countries, while heroin is less common. One of the biggest crime-related issues in recent times was the introduction of lockout laws in February 2014, in an attempt to curb alcohol-fuelled violence. Patrons could not enter clubs or bars in the inner-city after 1:30am, and last drinks were called at 3am. The lockout laws were removed in January 2020.

== Culture ==
=== Science, art, and history ===
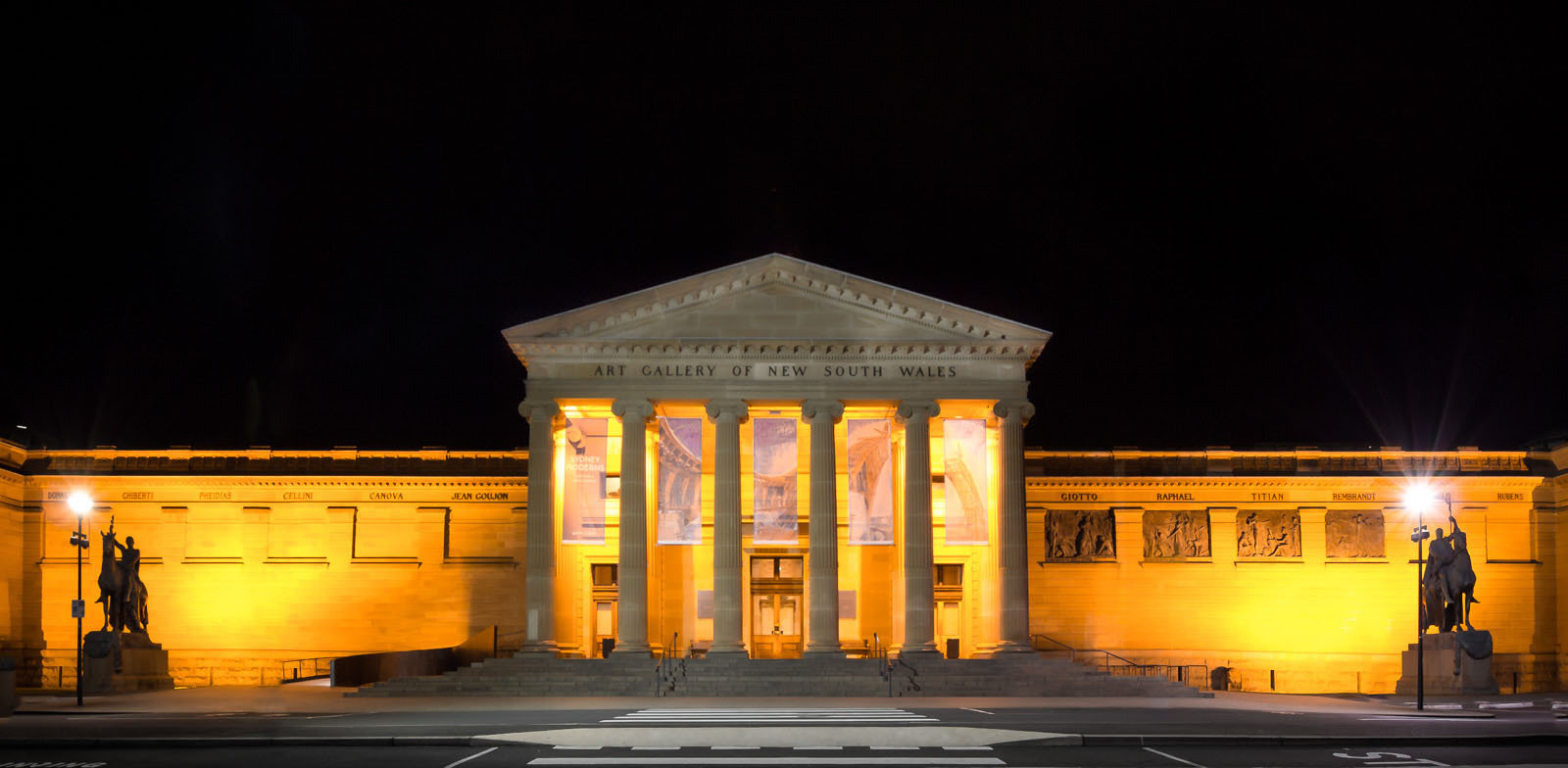
The Art Gallery of New South Wales, located in The Domain, is the fourth largest public gallery in Australia.

Ku-ring-gai Chase National Park is rich in Indigenous Australian heritage, containing around 1,500 pieces of Aboriginal rock art – the largest cluster of Indigenous sites in Australia. The park's indigenous sites include petroglyphs, art sites, burial sites, caves, marriage areas, birthing areas, midden sites, and tool manufacturing locations, which are dated to be around 5,000 years old. The inhabitants of the area were the Garigal people. Other rock art sites exist in the Sydney region, such as in Terrey Hills and Bondi, although the locations of most are not publicised to prevent damage by vandalism, and to retain their quality, as they are still regarded as sacred sites by Indigenous Australians.

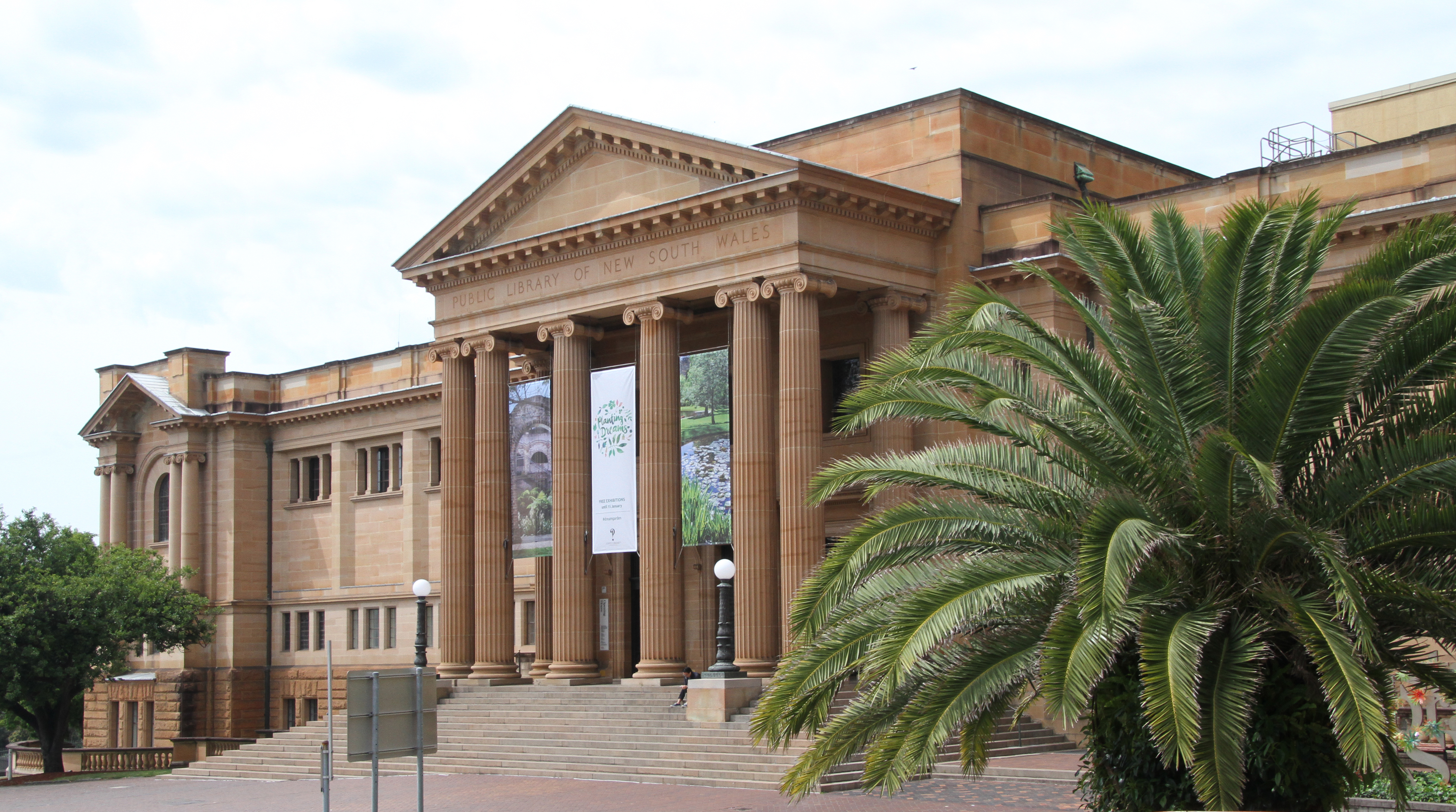
The State Library of New South Wales holds the oldest library collections in Australia.

The Australian Museum opened in Sydney in 1827 with the purpose of collecting and displaying the natural wealth of the colony. It remains Australia's oldest natural history museum. In 1995 the Museum of Sydney opened on the site of the first Government House. It recounts the story of the city's development. Other museums include the Powerhouse Museum and the Australian National Maritime Museum.

The State Library of New South Wales holds the oldest library collections in Australia, being established as the Australian Subscription Library in 1826. The Royal Society of New South Wales, formed in 1866, encourages "studies and investigations in science, art, literature, and philosophy". It is based in a terrace house in Darlington owned by the University of Sydney. The Sydney Observatory building was constructed in 1859 and used for astronomy and meteorology research until 1982 before being converted into a museum.

The Museum of Contemporary Art was opened in 1991 and occupies an Art Deco building in Circular Quay. Its collection was founded in the 1940s by artist and art collector John Power and has been maintained by the University of Sydney. Sydney's other significant art institution is the Art Gallery of New South Wales which coordinates the Archibald Prize for portraiture. Sydney is also home to contemporary art gallery Artspace, housed in the historic Gunnery Building in Woolloomooloo, fronting Sydney Harbour.

=== Entertainment ===
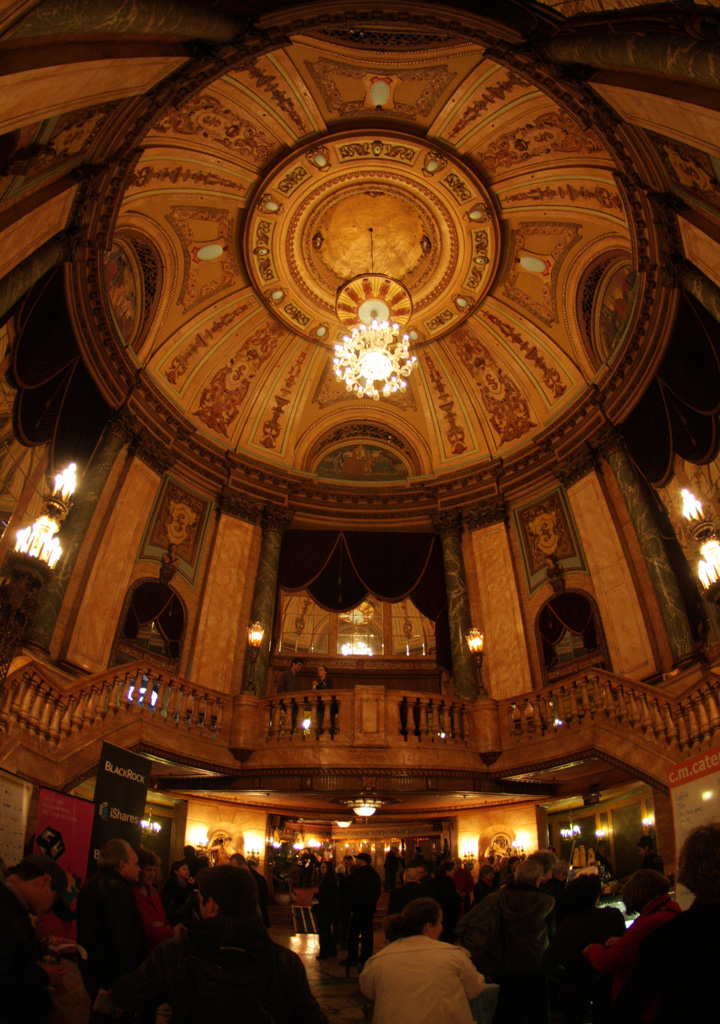
The State Theatre on Market Street was opened in 1929.

Sydney's first commercial theatre opened in 1832 and nine more had commenced performances by the late 1920s. The live medium lost much of its popularity to the cinema during the Great Depression before experiencing a revival after World War II. Prominent theatres in the city today include State Theatre, Theatre Royal, Sydney Theatre, The Wharf Theatre, and Capitol Theatre. Sydney Theatre Company maintains a roster of local, classical, and international plays. It occasionally features Australian theatre icons such as David Williamson, Hugo Weaving, and Geoffrey Rush. The city's other prominent theatre companies are New Theatre, Belvoir, and Griffin Theatre Company. Sydney is also home to Event Cinemas' first theatre, which opened on George St in 1913, under its former Greater Union brand; the theatre currently operates, and is regarded as one of Australia's busiest cinema locations.

The Sydney Opera House is the home of Opera Australia and Sydney Symphony. It has staged over 100,000 performances and received 100 million visitors since opening in 1973. Two other important performance venues in Sydney are Town Hall and the City Recital Hall. The Sydney Conservatorium of Music is located adjacent to the Royal Botanic Garden and serves the Australian music community through education and its biannual Australian Music Examinations Board exams.

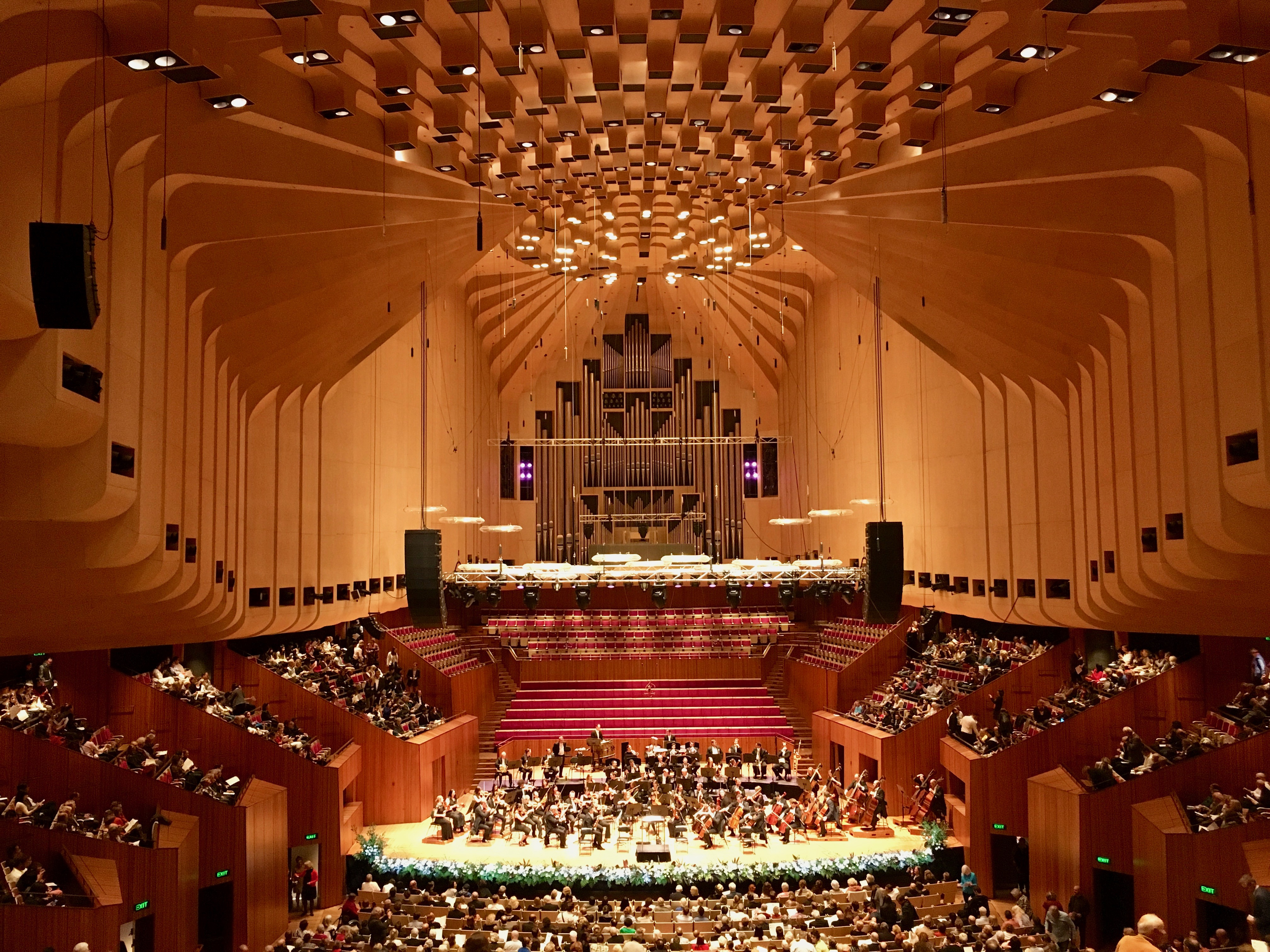
A concert at the Sydney Opera House

Many writers have originated in and set their work in Sydney. Others have visited the city and commented on it. Some of them are commemorated in the Sydney Writers Walk at Circular Quay. The city was the headquarters for Australia's first published newspaper, the Sydney Gazette. Watkin Tench's A Narrative of the Expedition to Botany Bay (1789) and A Complete Account of the Settlement at Port Jackson in New South Wales (1793) have remained the best-known accounts of life in early Sydney. Since the infancy of the establishment, much of the literature set in Sydney were concerned with life in the city's slums and working-class communities, notably William Lane's The Working Man's Paradise (1892), Christina Stead's Seven Poor Men of Sydney (1934) and Ruth Park's The Harp in the South (1948). The first Australian-born female novelist, Louisa Atkinson, set several novels in Sydney. Contemporary writers, such as Elizabeth Harrower, were born in the city and set most of their work there–Harrower's debut novel Down in the City (1957) was mostly set in a King's Cross apartment. Well known contemporary novels set in the city include Melina Marchetta's Looking for Alibrandi (1992), Peter Carey's 30 Days in Sydney: A Wildly Distorted Account (1999), J. M. Coetzee's Diary of a Bad Year (2007) and Kate Grenville's The Secret River (2010). The Sydney Writers' Festival is held annually between April and May.

Filmmaking in Sydney was prolific until the 1920s when spoken films were introduced and American productions gained dominance. The Australian New Wave saw a resurgence in film production, with many notable features shot in the city between the 1970s and 80s, helmed by directors such as Bruce Beresford, Peter Weir and Gillian Armstrong. Fox Studios Australia commenced production in Sydney in 1998. Successful films shot in Sydney since then include The Matrix, Lantana, Mission: Impossible 2, Moulin Rouge!, Star Wars: Episode II – Attack of the Clones, Australia, Superman Returns, The Great Gatsby and Anyone but You. The National Institute of Dramatic Art is based in Sydney and has several famous alumni such as Mel Gibson, Judy Davis, Baz Luhrmann, Cate Blanchett, Hugo Weaving and Jacqueline Mckenzie.

Sydney hosts several festivals throughout the year. The city's New Year's Eve celebrations are the largest in Australia. The Royal Easter Show is held every year at Sydney Olympic Park. Sydney Festival is Australia's largest arts festival. The travelling rock music festival Big Day Out originated in Sydney. The city's two largest film festivals are Sydney Film Festival and Tropfest. Vivid Sydney is an annual outdoor exhibition of art installations, light projections, and music. In 2015, Sydney was ranked the 13th top fashion capital in the world. It hosts the Australian Fashion Week in autumn. Sydney Mardi Gras has commenced each February since 1979.

Sydney's Chinatown has had numerous locations since the 1850s. It moved from George Street to Campbell Street to its current setting in Dixon Street in 1980. Little Italy is located in Stanley Street.

Restaurants, bars and nightclubs can be found in the entertainment hubs in the Sydney CBD (Darling Harbour, Barangaroo, The Rocks and George Street), Oxford Street, Surry Hills, Newtown and Parramatta. Kings Cross was previously considered the red-light district. The Star is the city's casino and is situated next to Darling Harbour while the new Crown Sydney resort is in nearby Barangaroo.

=== Media ===
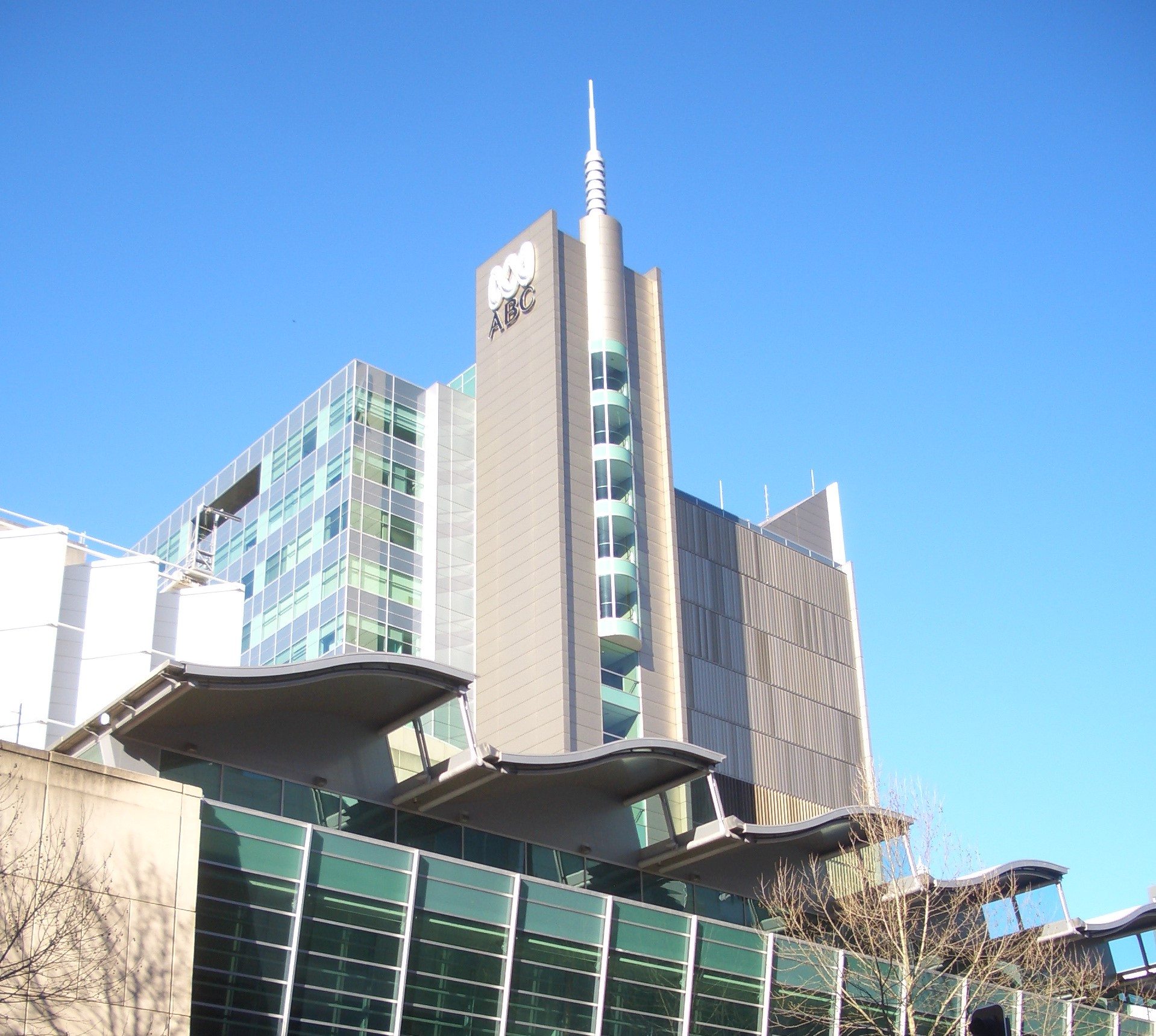
Australia's national broadcaster, the ABC, is headquartered in Ultimo.

The Sydney Morning Herald is Australia's oldest newspaper still in print; it has been published continuously since 1831. Its competitor is The Daily Telegraph, in print since 1879. Both papers have Sunday tabloid editions called The Sun-Herald and The Sunday Telegraph respectively. The Bulletin was founded in Sydney in 1880 and became Australia's longest running magazine. It closed after 128 years of continuous publication. Sydney heralded Australia's first newspaper, the Sydney Gazette, published until 1842.

Each of Australia's three commercial television networks and two public broadcasters is headquartered in Sydney. Nine's offices and news studios are in North Sydney, Ten is based in Pyrmont, and Seven is based in South Eveleigh in Redfern. The Australian Broadcasting Corporation is located in Ultimo, and the Special Broadcasting Service is based in Artarmon. Multiple digital channels have been provided by all five networks since 2000. Foxtel is based in North Ryde and sells subscription cable television to most of the urban area. Sydney's first radio stations commenced broadcasting in the 1920s. Radio has managed to survive despite the introduction of television and the Internet. 2UE was founded in 1925 and under the ownership of Nine Entertainment is the oldest station still broadcasting. Competing stations include the more popular 2GB, ABC Radio Sydney, KIIS 106.5, Triple M, Nova 96.9 and 2Day FM.

== Sport and outdoor activities ==
Sydney's earliest migrants brought with them a passion for sport but were restricted by the lack of facilities and equipment. The first organised sports were boxing, wrestling, and horse racing from 1810 in Hyde Park. Horse racing is hosted by the Australian Turf Club across four venues (Royal Randwick, Rosehill Gardens, Canterbury Park and Warwick Farm racecourse) hosting events such as the $20 million The Everest and the Golden Slipper Stakes attract widespread attention. The first cricket club was formed in 1826 and matches were played within Hyde Park throughout the 1830s and 1840s. Cricket is a favoured sport in summer and big matches have been held at the Sydney Cricket Ground since 1878. The New South Wales Blues compete in the Sheffield Shield league and the Sydney Sixers and Sydney Thunder contest the national Big Bash Twenty20 competition.

First played in Sydney in 1865, rugby grew to be the city's most popular football code by the 1880s. One-tenth of the state's population attended a New South Wales versus New Zealand rugby match in 1907. Rugby league separated from rugby union in 1908. The New South Wales Waratahs contest the Super Rugby competition, while the Sydney Rays represent the city in the National Rugby Championship. The national Wallabies rugby union team competes in Sydney in international matches such as the Bledisloe Cup, Rugby Championship, and World Cup. Sydney is home to nine of the seventeen teams in the National Rugby League competition: Canterbury-Bankstown Bulldogs, Cronulla-Sutherland Sharks, Manly-Warringah Sea Eagles, Penrith Panthers, Parramatta Eels, South Sydney Rabbitohs, St George Illawarra Dragons, Sydney Roosters, and Wests Tigers. New South Wales contests the annual State of Origin series against Queensland.

Sydney FC and the Western Sydney Wanderers compete in the A-League Men and A-League Women competitions. The Sydney Swans and Greater Western Sydney Giants are local Australian rules football clubs that play in the Australian Football League and the AFL Women's. The Sydney Kings compete in the National Basketball League. The Sydney Uni Flames play in the Women's National Basketball League. The Sydney Blue Sox contest the Australian Baseball League. The NSW Pride are a member of the Hockey One League. The Sydney Bears and Sydney Ice Dogs play in the Australian Ice Hockey League. The Swifts are competitors in the national women's netball league.

=== Major sporting venues ===
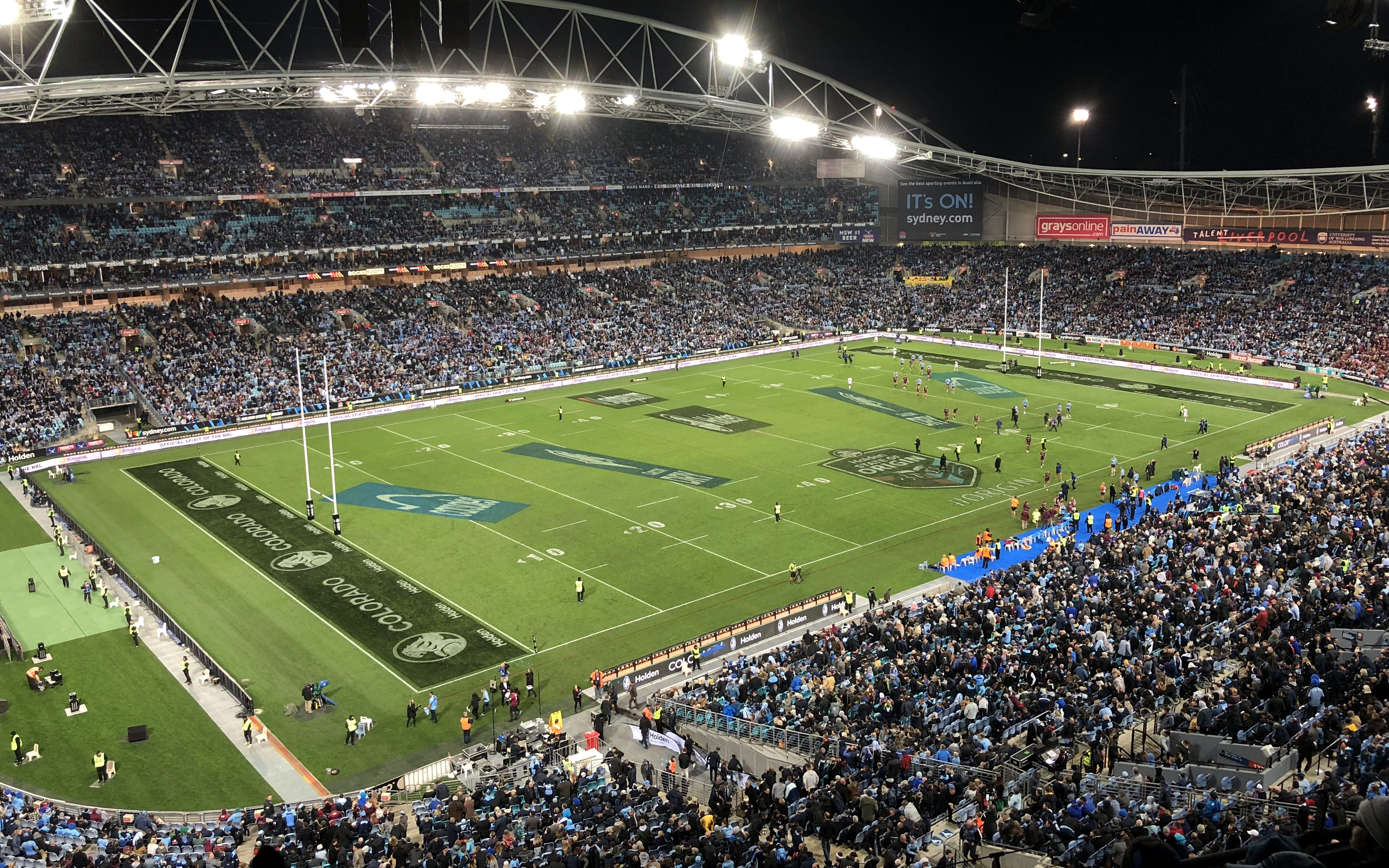
Stadium Australia

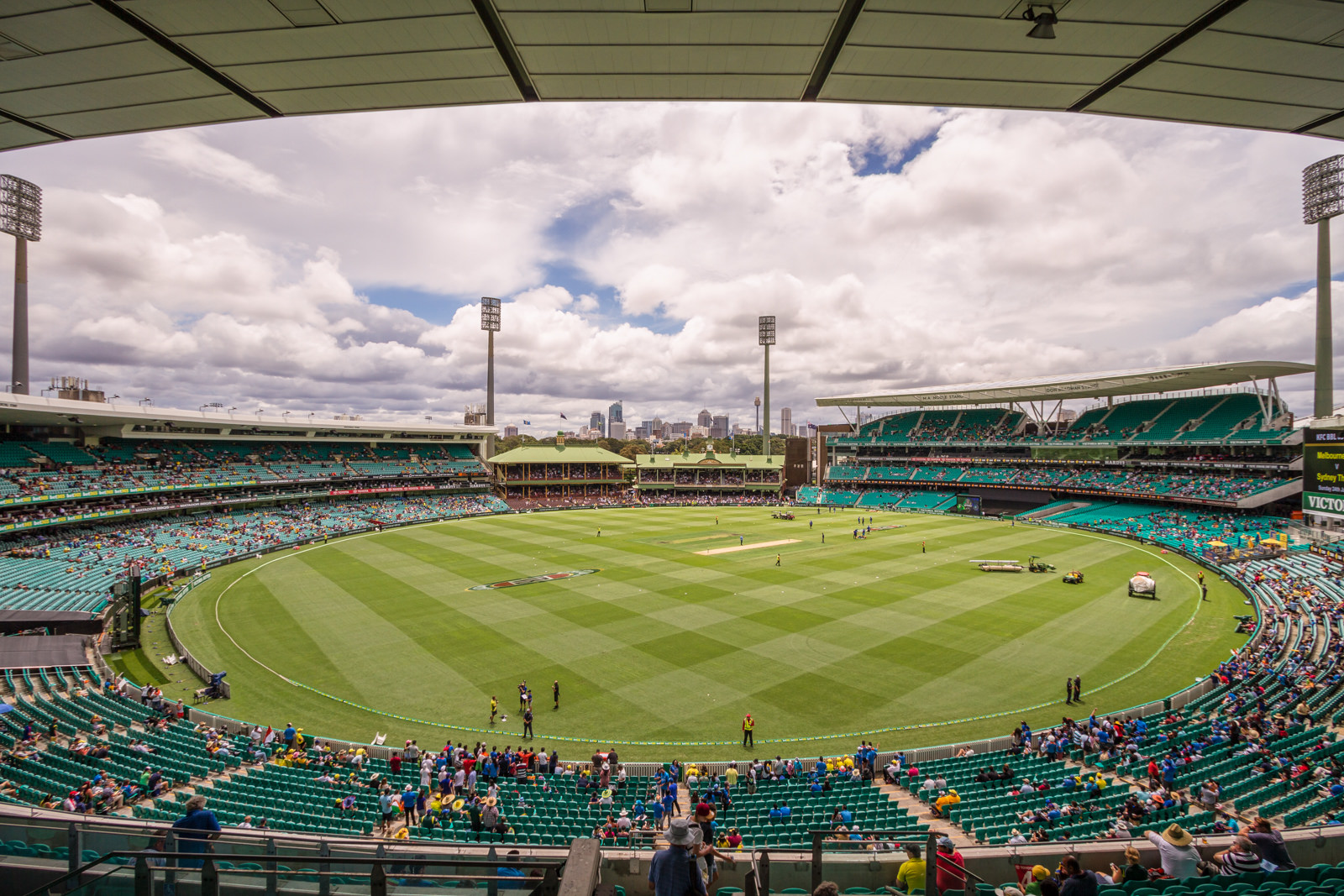
Sydney Cricket Ground

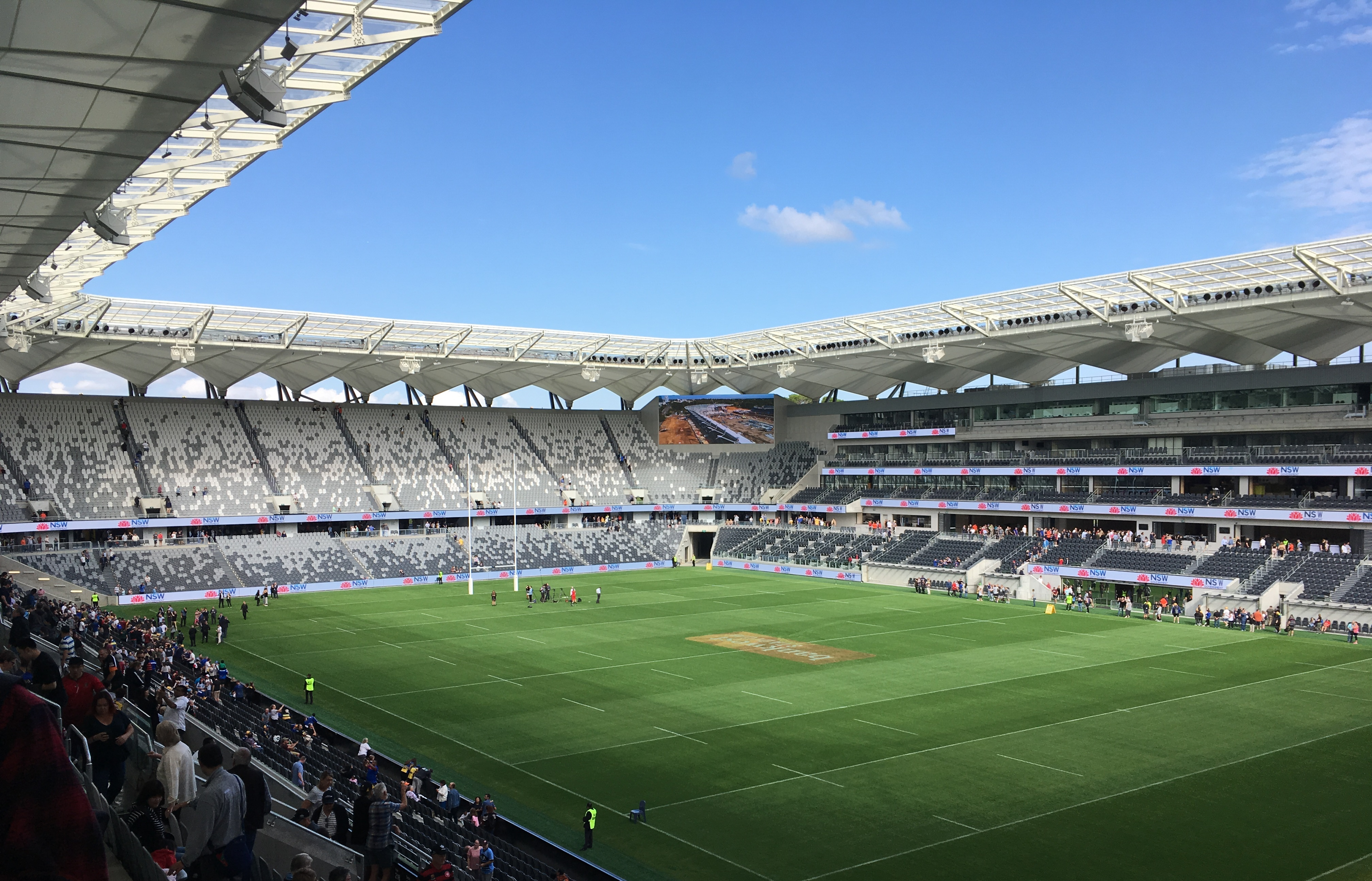
Western Sydney Stadium

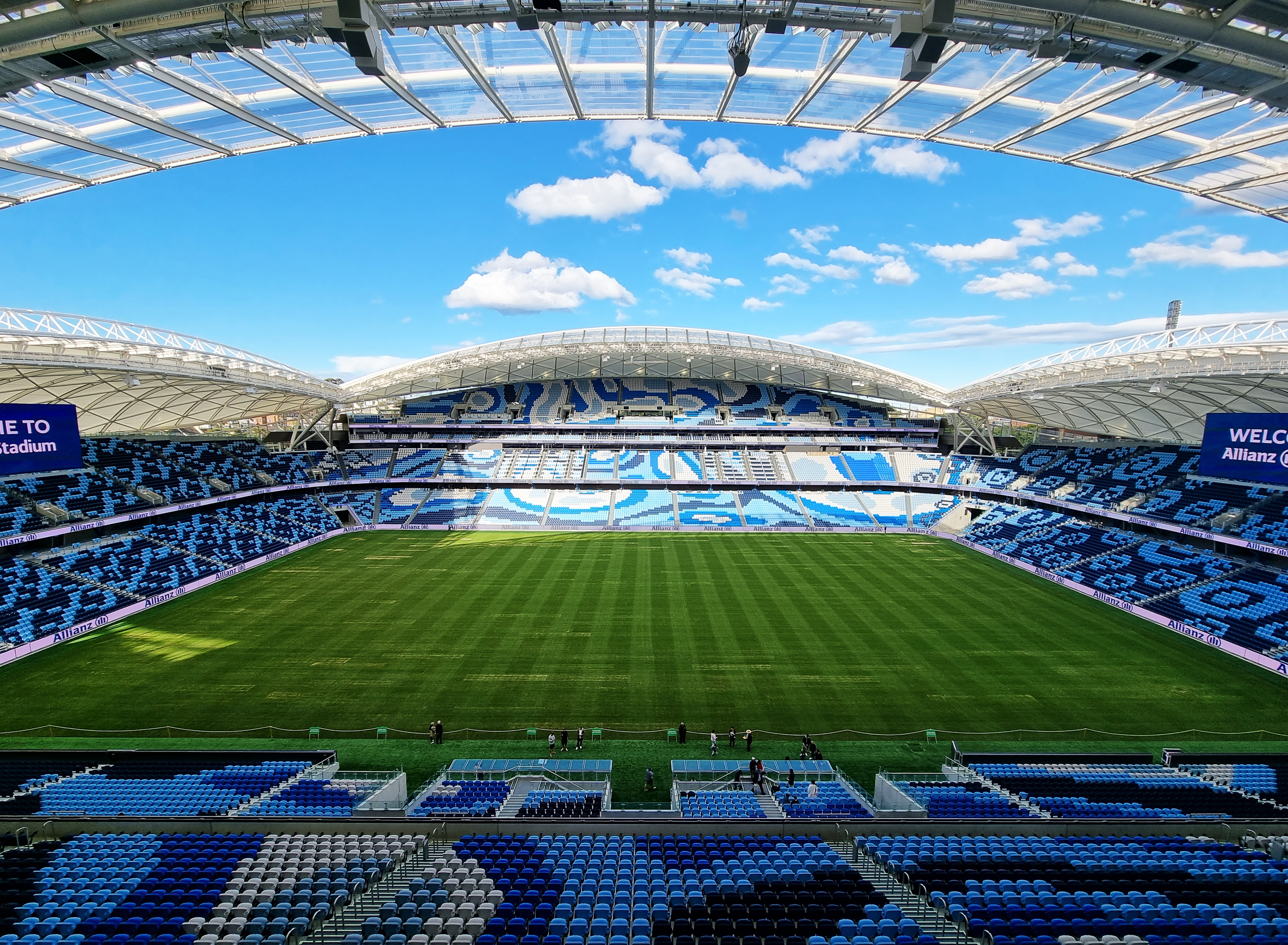
Sydney Football Stadium

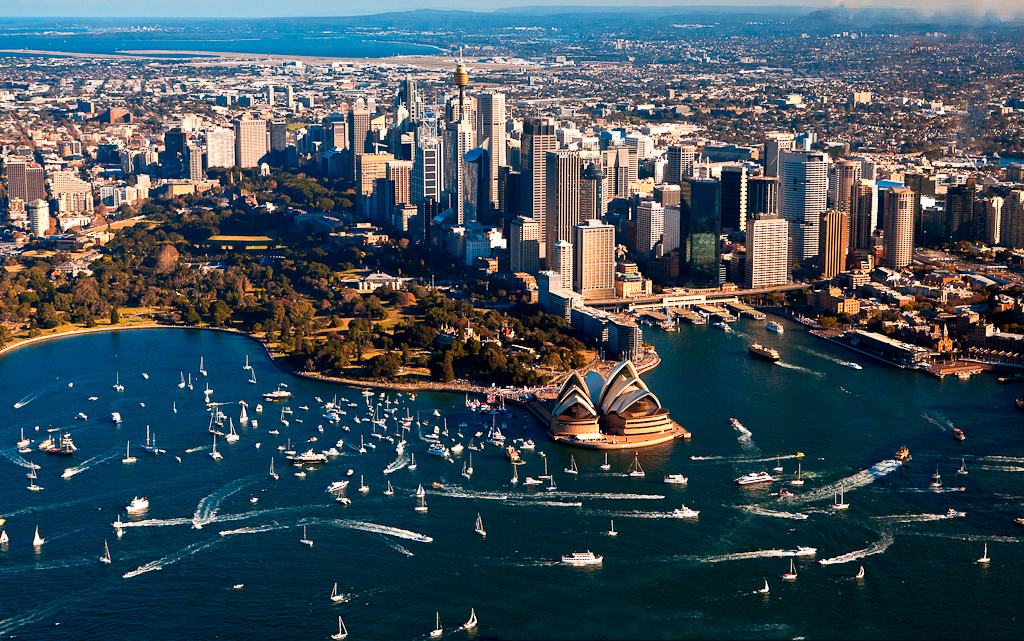
Sailing on Sydney Harbour

Women were first allowed to participate in recreational swimming when separate baths were opened at Woolloomooloo Bay in the 1830s. From being illegal at the beginning of the century, sea bathing gained immense popularity during the early 1900s and the first surf lifesaving club was established at Bondi Beach. Disputes about appropriate clothing for surf bathing surfaced occasionally and concerned men as well as women. The City2Surf is an annual 14 km (8.7 mi) running race from the CBD to Bondi Beach and has been held since 1971. In 2010, 80,000 runners participated which made it the largest run of its kind in the world.

Sailing races have been held on Sydney Harbour since 1827. Yachting has been popular amongst wealthier residents since the 1840s and the Royal Sydney Yacht Squadron was founded in 1862. The Sydney to Hobart Yacht Race is a 1,170 km (727 mi) event that starts from Sydney Harbour on Boxing Day. Since its inception in 1945 it has been recognised as one of the most difficult yacht races in the world. Six sailors died and 71 vessels of 115 failed to finish in the 1998 edition.

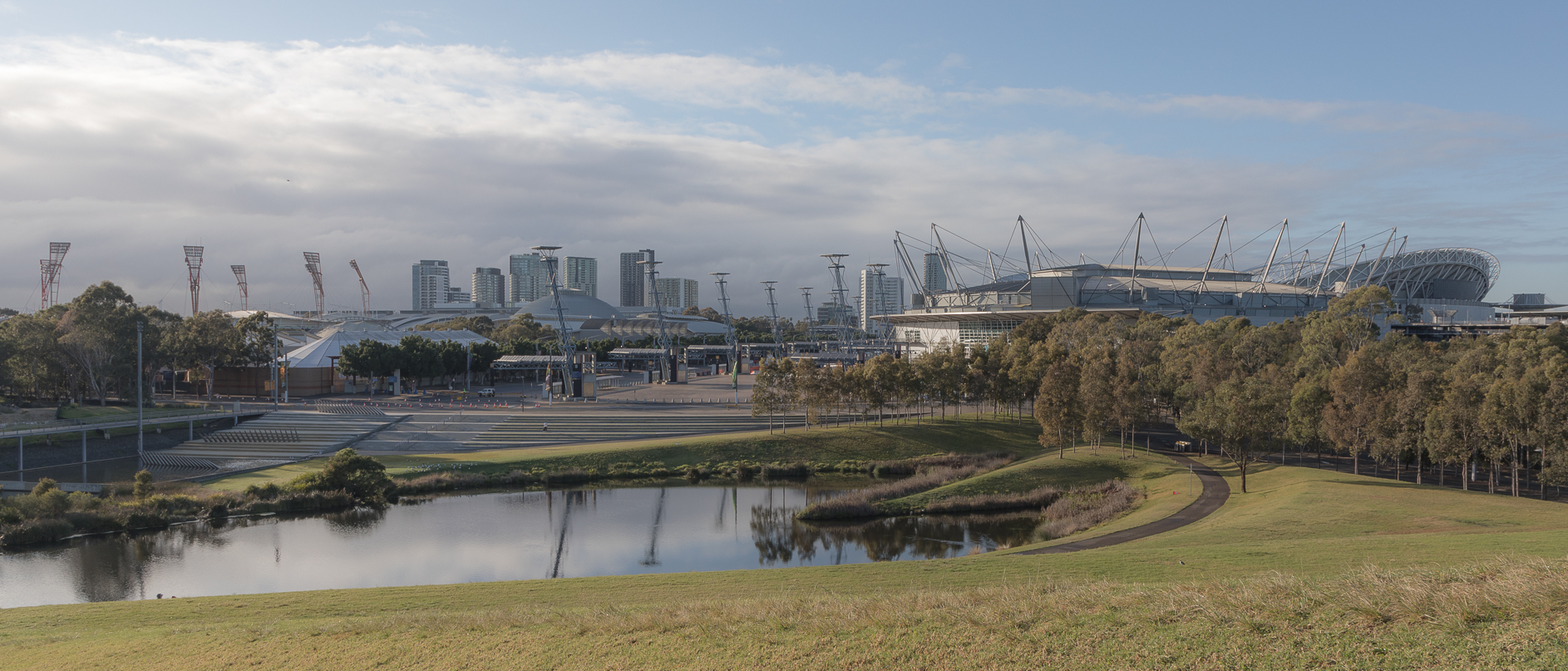
Sydney Olympic Park was built for the 2000 Olympics and has become a major sporting and recreational precinct.

The Royal Sydney Golf Club is based in Rose Bay and since its opening in 1893 has hosted the Australian Open on 13 occasions. Royal Randwick Racecourse opened in 1833 and holds several major cups throughout the year.

Sydney benefitted from the construction of significant sporting infrastructure in preparation for its hosting of the 2000 Summer Olympics. The Sydney Olympic Park accommodates athletics, aquatics, tennis, hockey, archery, baseball, cycling, equestrian, and rowing facilities. It also includes the high capacity Stadium Australia used for rugby, soccer, and Australian rules football. The Sydney Football Stadium was completed in 1988 and was used for rugby and soccer matches. Sydney Cricket Ground was opened in 1878 and is used for both cricket and Australian rules football fixtures.

Sydney was one of the host cities during the 2023 FIFA Women's World Cup. Sydney Football Stadium and Stadium Australia were selected as venues, with the later hosting the final.

The Sydney International tennis tournament is held here at the beginning of each year as the warm-up for the Grand Slam in Melbourne. Two of the most successful tennis players in history (Ken Rosewall and Todd Woodbridge) were born in and live in the city.

Sydney co-hosted the FIBA Oceania Championship in 1979, 1985, 1989, 1995, 2007, 2009 and 2011.

== Government ==
=== Historical governance ===
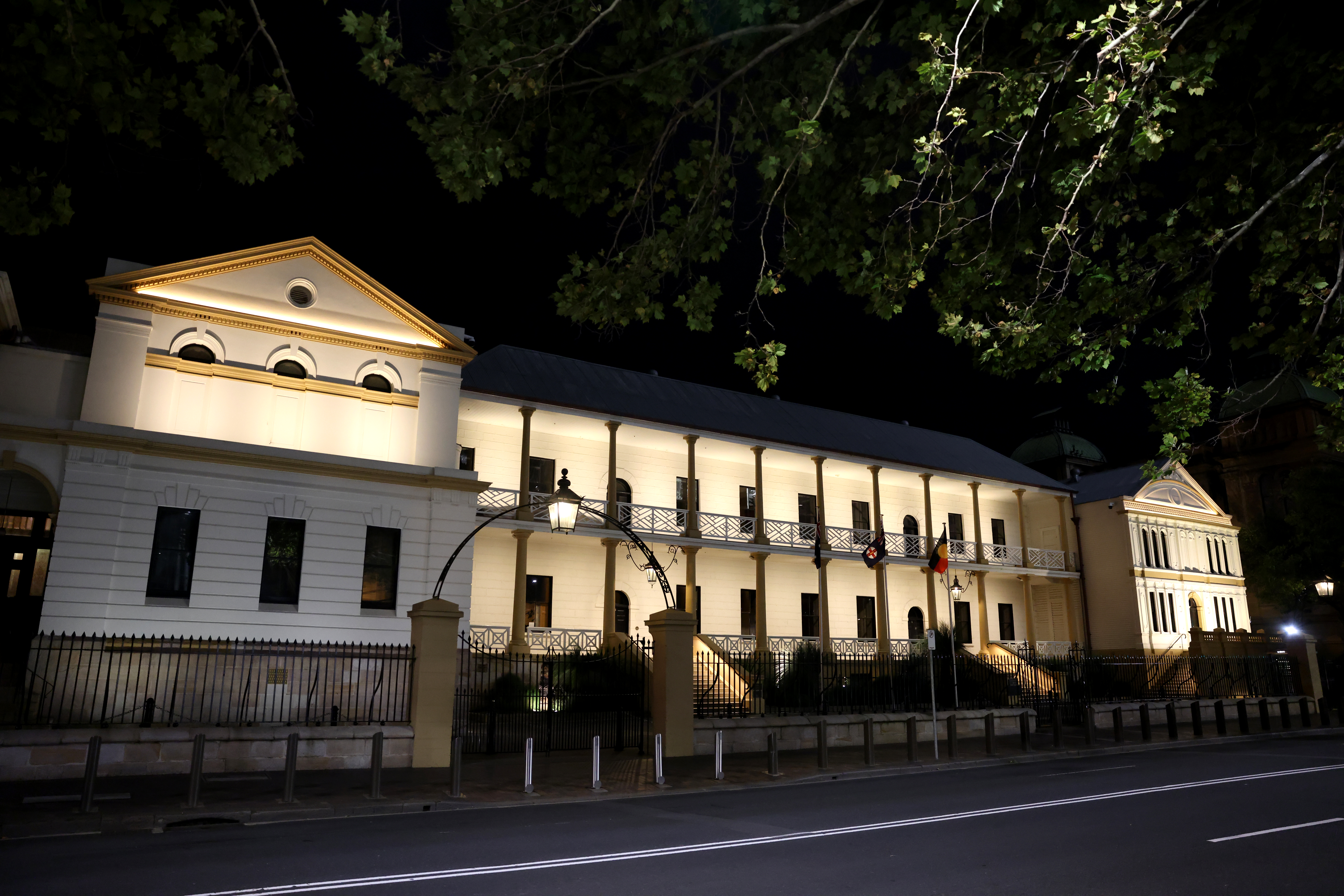
The New South Wales parliament sits at Parliament House, which is the oldest public building in Australia.

The first five governors had near autocratic power in the colony of New South Wales, subject only to the laws of England and the supervision of the Colonial Office in London. Sydney was the seat of government for the colony which encompassed over half the Australian continent. The first Legislative Council met in 1826, and in 1842, the imperial parliament expanded and reformed the council, making it partly elected. In the same year, the town of Sydney officially became a city and an elected municipal council was established. The council had limited powers, mostly relating to services such as street lighting and drainage. Its boundaries were restricted to an area of 11.6 square kilometres, taking in the city centre and the modern suburbs of Woolloomooloo, Surry Hills, Chippendale, and Pyrmont. As Sydney grew, other municipal councils were formed to provide local administration.

In 1856, New South Wales achieved responsible government with the introduction of a bicameral parliament, based in Sydney, comprising a directly elected Legislative Assembly and a nominated Legislative Council. With the federation of the Australian colonies in 1901, Sydney became the capital of the state of New South Wales and its administration was divided between the Commonwealth, State and constituent local governments.

=== Government in the present ===
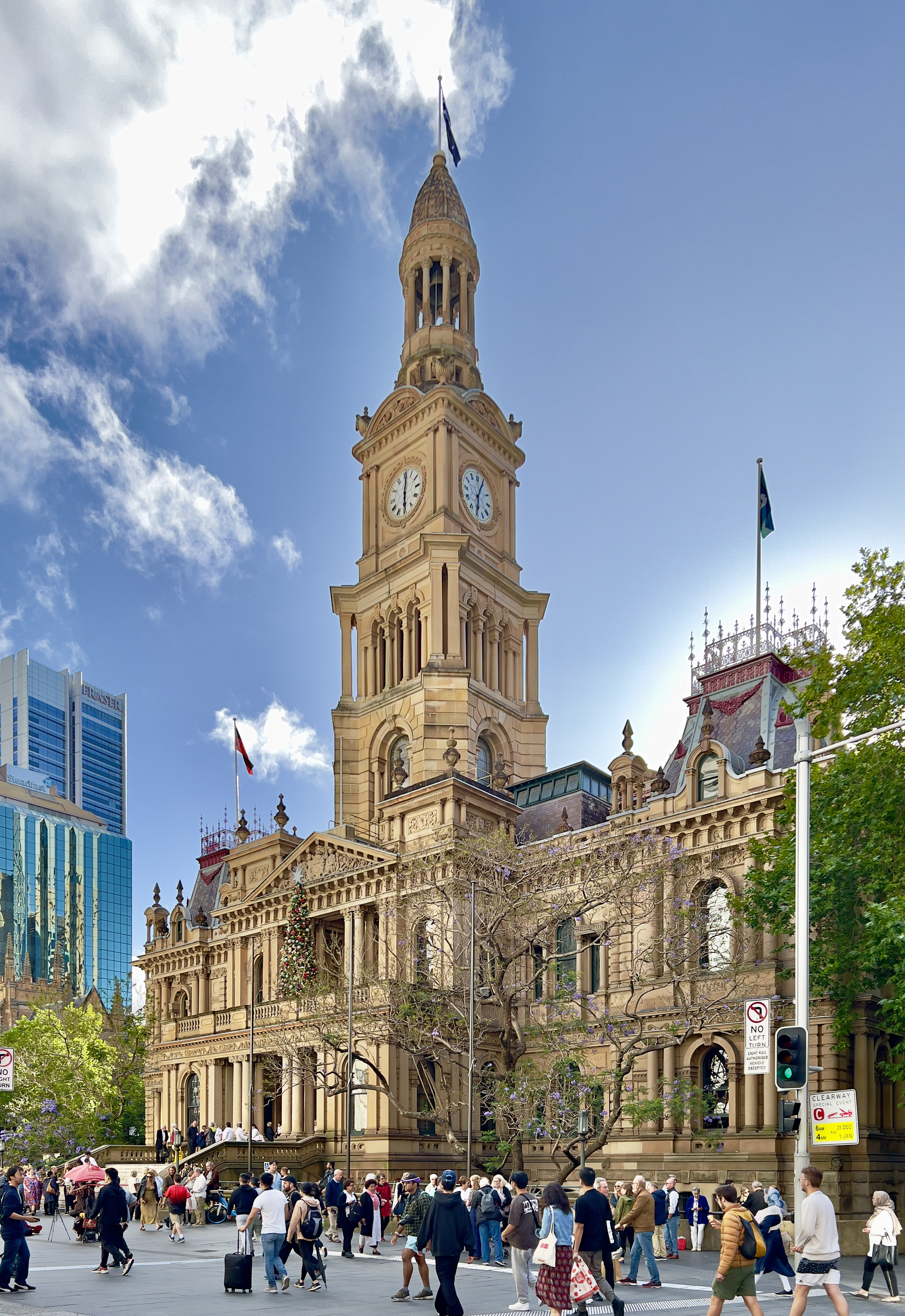
The Sydney Town Hall is the seat of the City of Sydney; the oldest local government in the city

In common with other Australian capital cities, Sydney has no single local government covering its whole area. Local government areas have responsibilities such as local roads, libraries, child care, community services and waste collection, whereas the state government retains responsibility for main roads, traffic control, public transport, policing, education, and major infrastructure project. There are 34 local government areas which are wholly or mostly within Greater Sydney as defined by the Australian Bureau of Statistics. Greater Sydney's boundaries encompass 49 state electoral districts and 24 federal electoral districts.

- Bayside
- Canterbury-Bankstown
- Blacktown
- Blue Mountains
- Burwood
- Camden
- Campbelltown
- Canada Bay
- Central Coast
- Cumberland
- Fairfield
- Georges River
- Hawkesbury
- The Hills
- Hornsby
- Hunter's Hill
- Inner West
- Ku-ring-gai
- Lane Cove
- Liverpool
- Mosman
- North Sydney
- Northern Beaches
- Parramatta
- Penrith
- Randwick
- Ryde
- Strathfield
- Sutherland
- Sydney
- Waverley
- Willoughby
- Wollondilly
- Woollahra

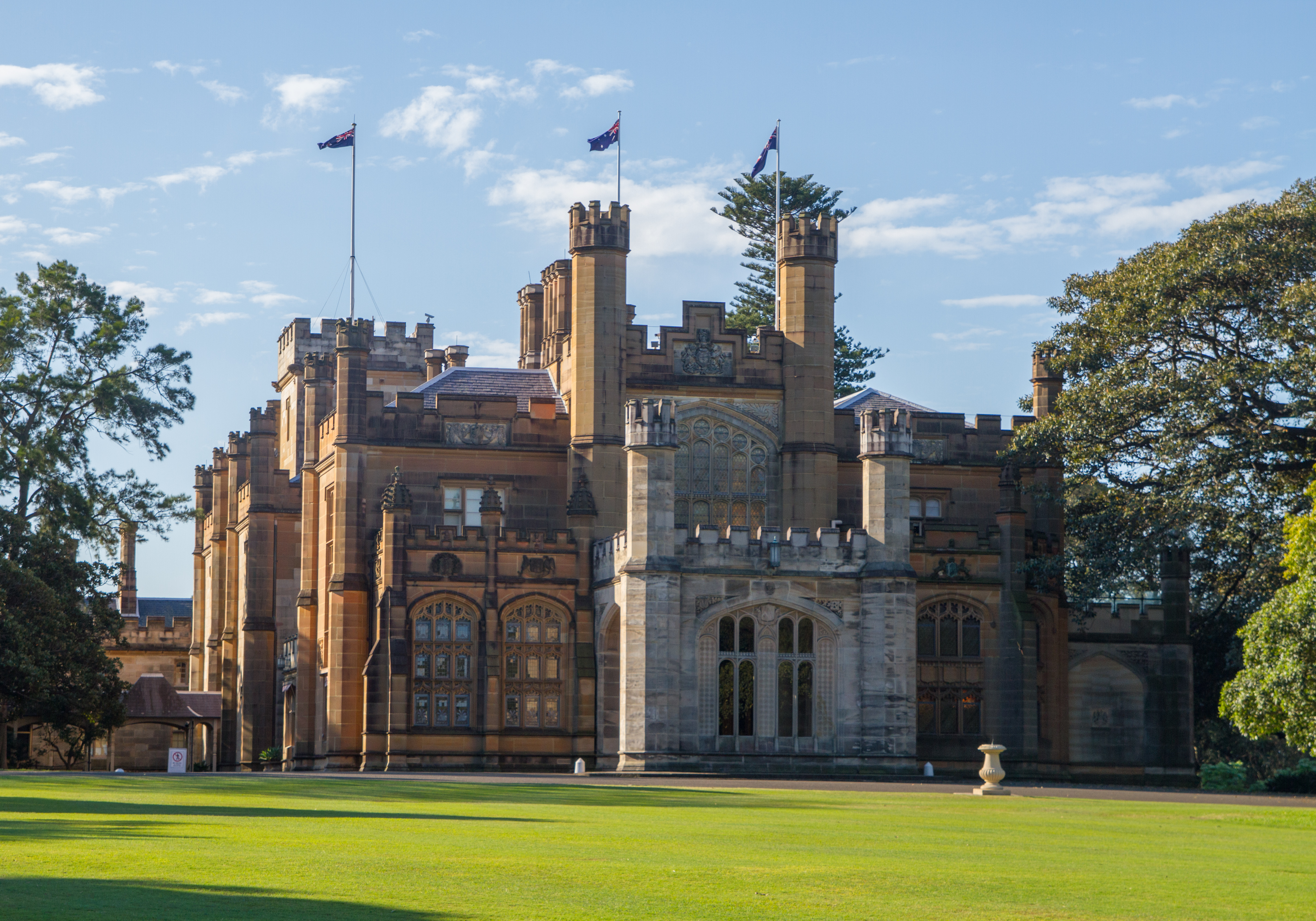
Government House is the official residence of the Governor of New South Wales

Sydney is the location of the secondary official residences of the Governor-General and Prime Minister – Admiralty House and Kirribilli House respectively. The Parliament of New South Wales sits in Parliament House on Macquarie Street. This building was completed in 1816 and first served as a hospital. The Legislative Council moved into its northern wing in 1829 and by 1852 had entirely supplanted the surgeons from their quarters. Several additions have been made as the Parliament has expanded, but it retains its original Georgian façade. Government House was completed in 1845 and has served as the home of 25 Governors and 5 Governors-General. The Cabinet of Australia also meets in Sydney when needed.

The highest court in the state is the Supreme Court of New South Wales, located in Queen's Square. The city is also the home of numerous branches of the intermediate District Court of New South Wales and the lower Local Court of New South Wales.

In the past, the state has tended to resist amalgamating Sydney's more populated local government areas as merged councils could pose a threat to its governmental power. Established in 1842, the City of Sydney is one such local government area and includes the CBD and some adjoining inner suburbs. It is responsible for fostering development in the local area, providing local services (waste collection and recycling, libraries, parks, sporting facilities), promoting the interests of residents, supporting organisations that target the local community, and attracting and providing infrastructure for commerce, tourism, and industry. The City of Sydney is led by an elected Council and Lord Mayor.

In federal politics, Sydney was initially considered as a possibility for Australia's capital city; the newly created city of Canberra ultimately filled this role. Seven Australian prime ministers have been born in Sydney, more than any other city, including the first prime minister, Edmund Barton, and the current prime minister, Anthony Albanese.

Essential public emergency services are provided and managed by the State Government. Greater Sydney is served by:

- New South Wales Police Force
- New South Wales Ambulance
- Fire and Rescue NSW

== Infrastructure ==
=== Education ===
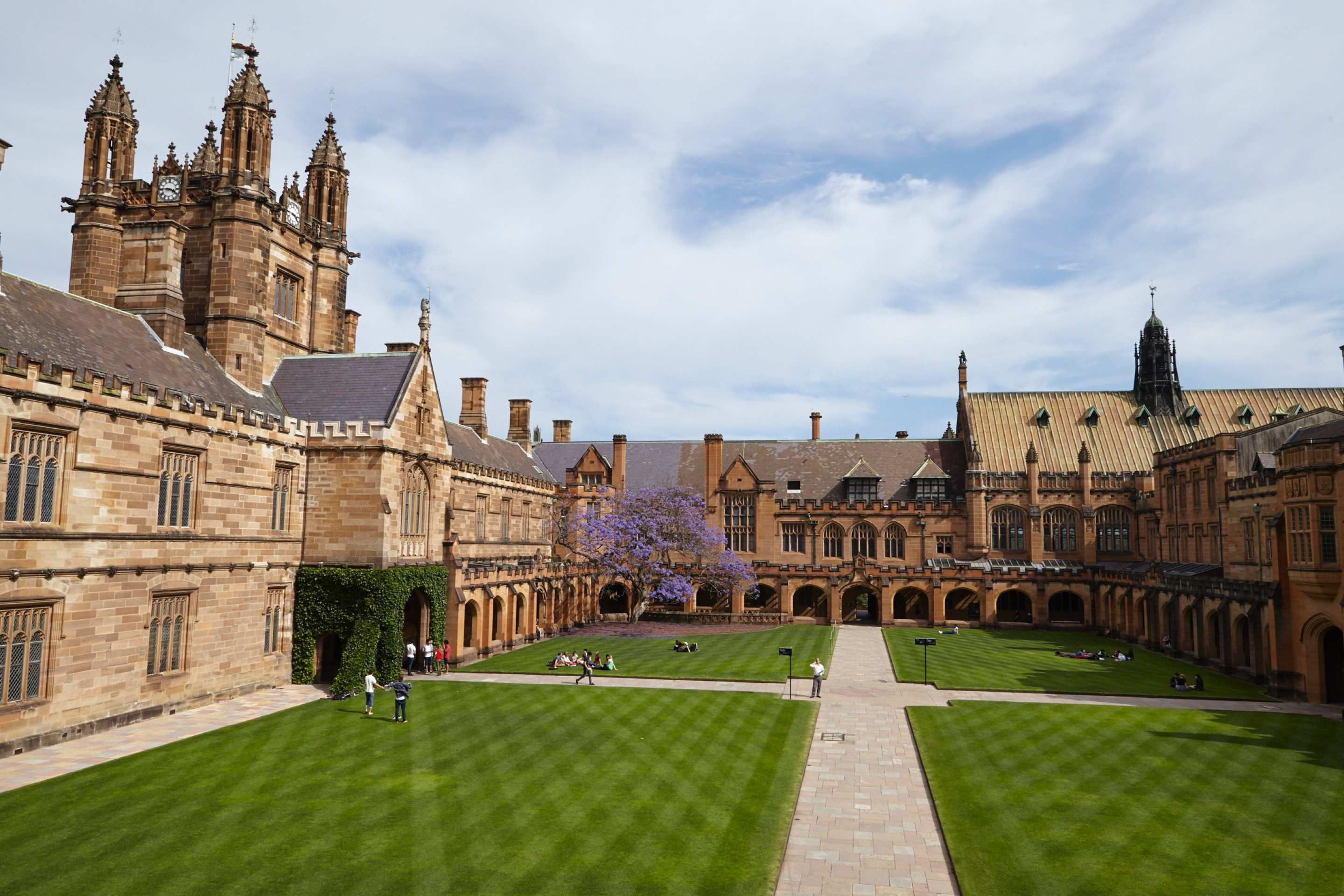
The University of Sydney

Education became a focus for the colony from the 1870s when public schools began to form and schooling became compulsory. By 2011, 90% of working age residents had completed some schooling and 57% had completed the highest level of school. 1,390,703 people were enrolled in an educational institution in 2011 with 45.1% of these attending school and 16.5% studying at a university. Undergraduate or postgraduate qualifications are held by 22.5% of working age Sydney residents and 40.2% of working age residents of the City of Sydney. The most common fields of tertiary qualification are commerce (22.8%), engineering (13.4%), society and culture (10.8%), health (7.8%), and education (6.6%).

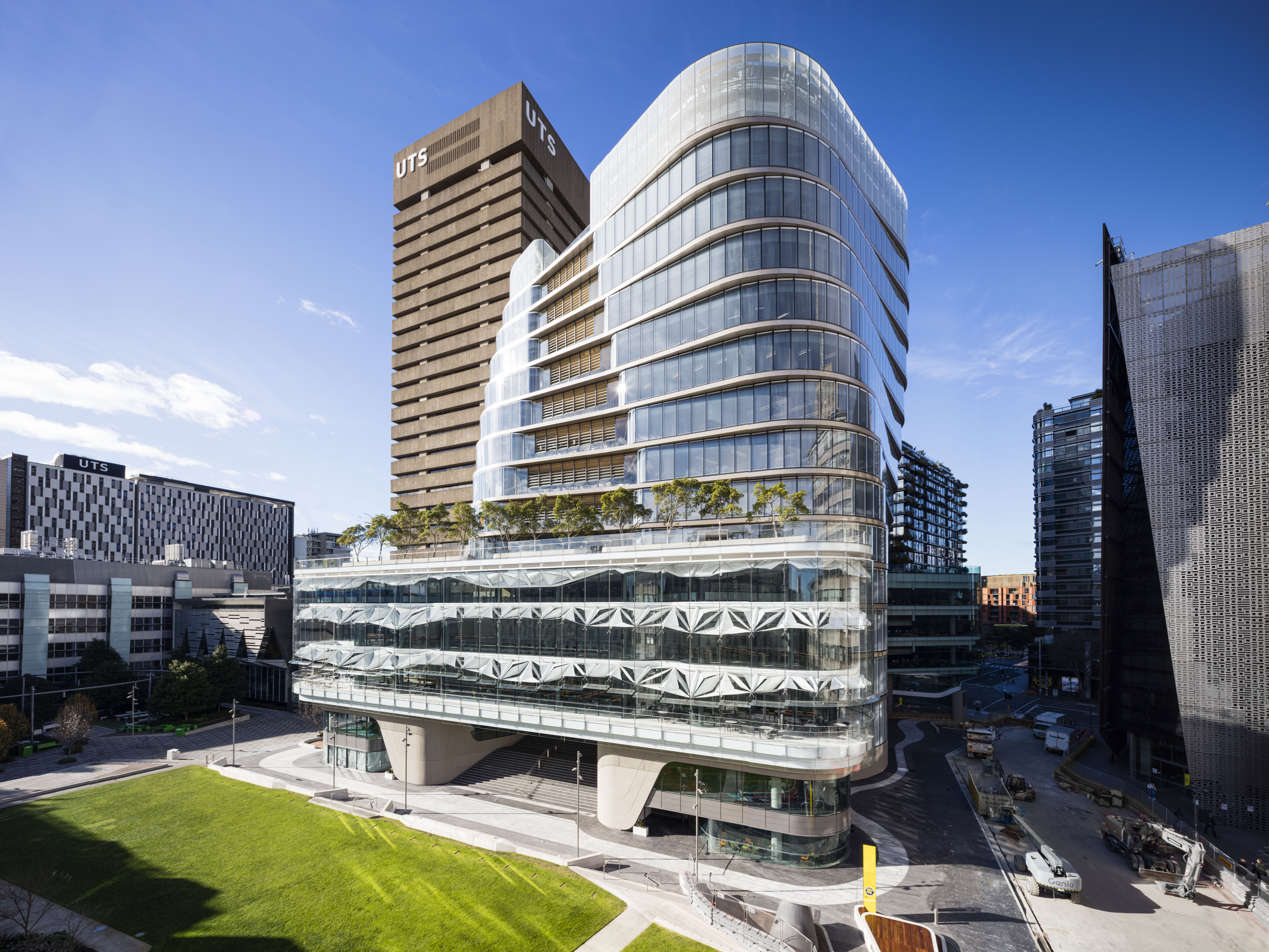
The University of Technology Sydney

There are six public universities based in Sydney: The University of Sydney, University of New South Wales, University of Technology Sydney, Macquarie University, Western Sydney University, and Australian Catholic University. Five public universities maintain secondary campuses in the city: the University of Notre Dame Australia, Central Queensland University, Victoria University, University of Wollongong, and University of Newcastle. Charles Sturt University and Southern Cross University operate secondary campuses only designated for international students. In addition, four public universities offer programs in Sydney through third-party providers: University of the Sunshine Coast, La Trobe University, Federation University Australia and Charles Darwin University. 5.2% of residents of Sydney are attending a university. The University of New South Wales and the University of Sydney are ranked equal 19th in the world, the University of Technology Sydney is ranked in the top 100, while Macquarie University is ranked 237, and Western Sydney University is ranked 474. Sydney has public, denominational, and independent schools. 7.8% of Sydney residents are attending primary school and 6.4% are enrolled in secondary school. There are 935 public preschool, primary, and secondary schools in Sydney that are administered by the New South Wales Department of Education. 14 of the 17 selective secondary schools in New South Wales are based in Sydney.

Public vocational education and training in Sydney are run by TAFE New South Wales and began with the opening of the Sydney Technical College in 1878. The college became the Sydney Institute in 1992 and now operates alongside its sister TAFE facilities across the Sydney metropolitan area, namely the Northern Sydney Institute, the Western Sydney Institute, and the South Western Sydney Institute. At the 2011 census, 2.4% of Sydney residents are enrolled in a TAFE course.

=== Health ===
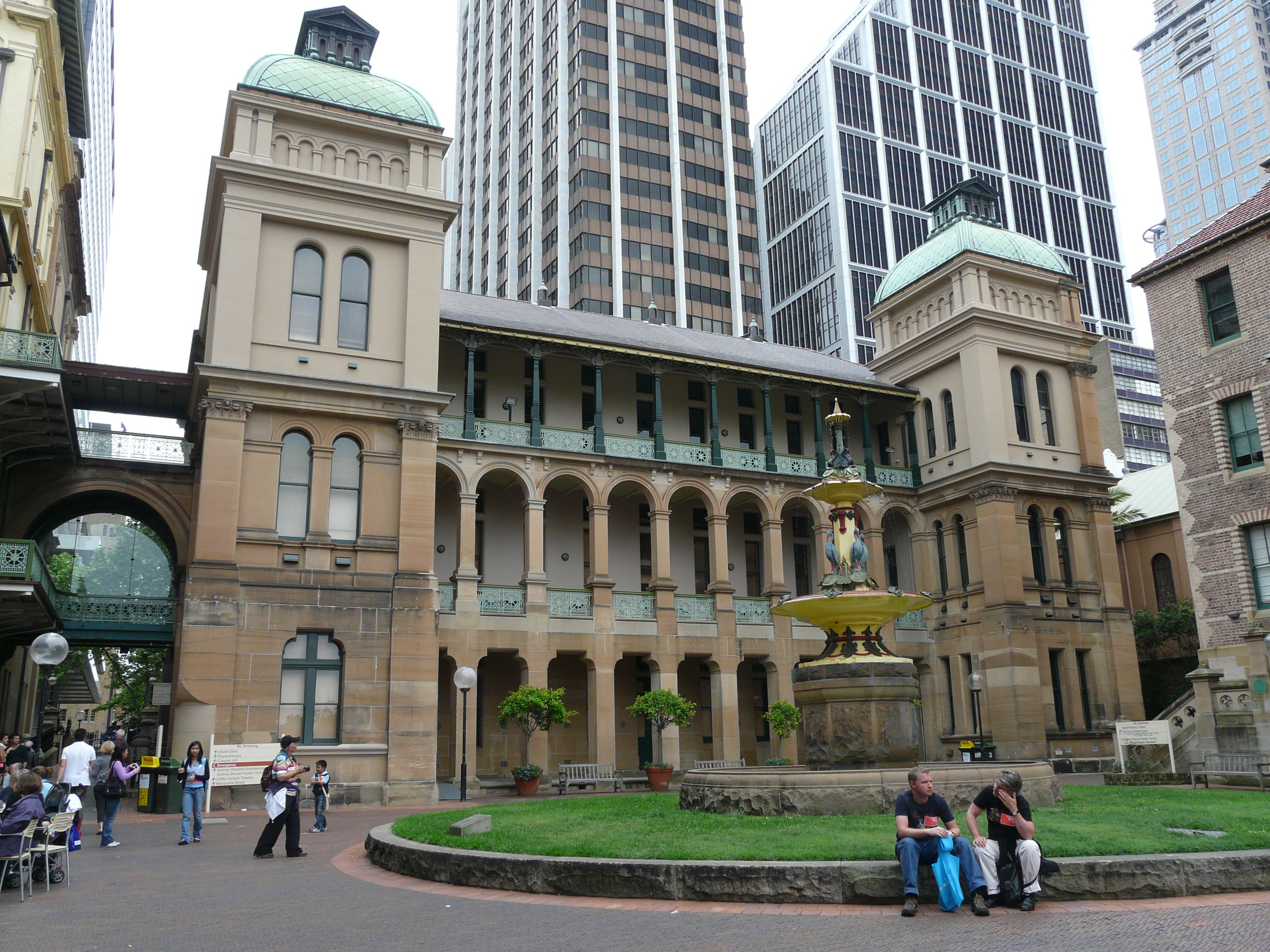
The Sydney Hospital, completed in 1816

The first hospital in the new colony was a collection of tents at The Rocks. Many of the convicts that survived the trip suffered from dysentery, smallpox, scurvy, and typhoid. Healthcare facilities remained inadequate despite the arrival of a prefabricated hospital with the Second Fleet and the construction of new hospitals at Parramatta, Windsor, and Liverpool in the 1790s.

Governor Macquarie arranged for the construction of Sydney Hospital, completed in 1816. Parts of the facility have been repurposed for use as Parliament House but the hospital itself still operates. The city's first emergency department was established at Sydney Hospital in 1870. Demand for emergency medical care increased from 1895 with the introduction of an ambulance service. The Sydney Hospital also housed Australia's first teaching facility for nurses, the Nightingale Wing, established with the input of Florence Nightingale in 1868.

Healthcare was recognised as a right in the early 1900s and Sydney's public hospitals came under the oversight of the Government of New South Wales. The administration of healthcare across Sydney is handled by eight local health districts: Central Coast, Illawarra Shoalhaven, Sydney, Nepean Blue Mountains, Northern Sydney, South Eastern Sydney, South Western Sydney, and Western Sydney. The Prince of Wales Hospital was established in 1852 and became the first of several major hospitals to be opened. St Vincent's Hospital was founded in 1857, followed by Royal Alexandra Hospital for Children in 1880, the Prince Henry Hospital in 1881, the Royal Prince Alfred Hospital in 1882, the Royal North Shore Hospital in 1885, the St George Hospital in 1894, and the Nepean Hospital in 1895. Westmead Hospital in 1978 was the last major facility to open.

=== Transport ===
==== Roads ====
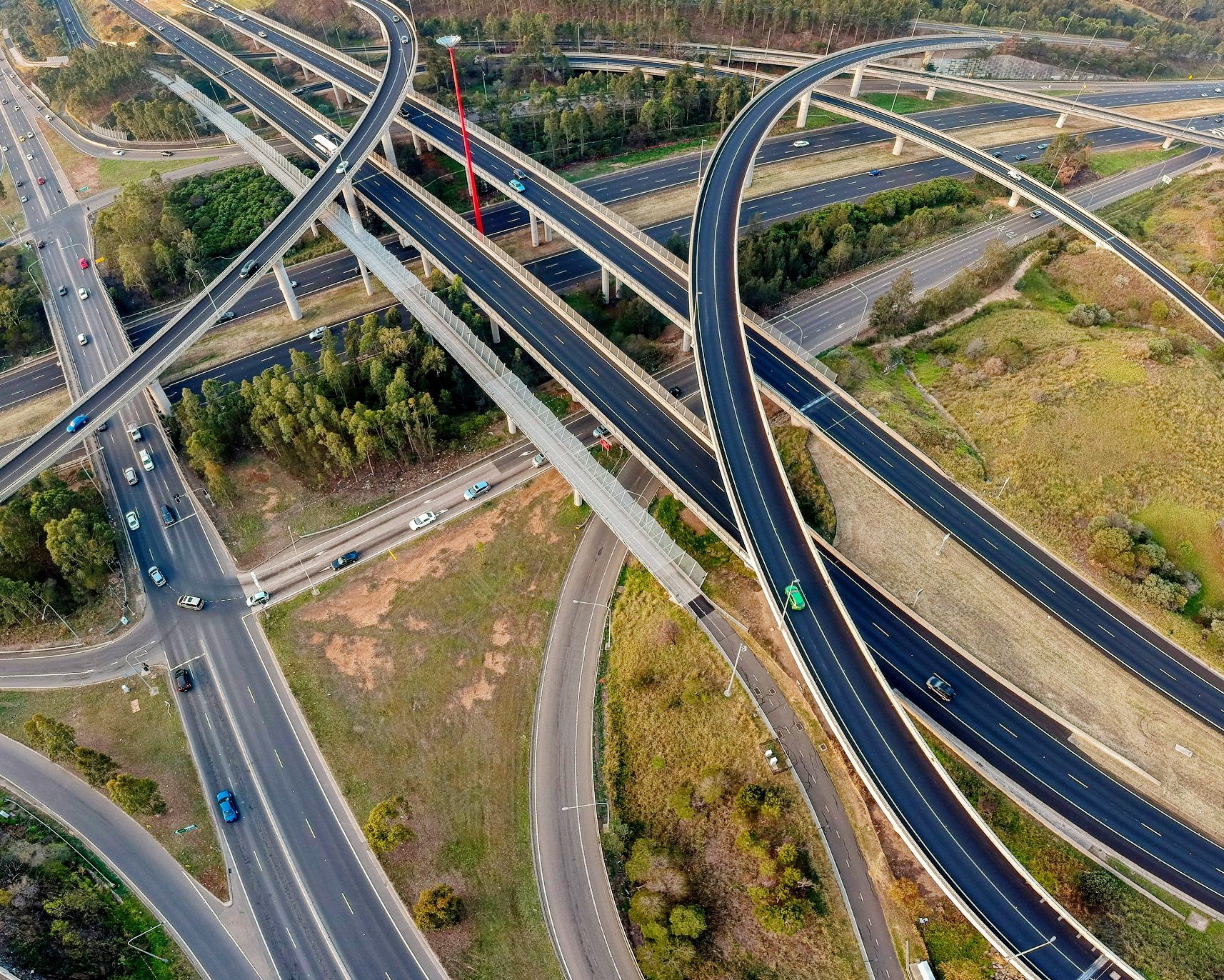
Light Horse Interchange, the largest of its kind in Australia

The motor vehicle, more than any other factor, has determined the pattern of Sydney's urban development since World War II. The growth of low-density housing in the city's outer suburbs has made car ownership necessary for hundreds of thousands of households. The percentage of trips taken by car has increased from 13% in 1947 to 50% in 1960 and 70% in 1971. The most important roads in Sydney were the nine Metroads, including the 110 km (68 mi) Sydney Orbital Network. Sydney's reliance on motor vehicles and its sprawling road network has been criticised by proponents of mass public transport and high-density housing. The Light Horse Interchange in western Sydney is the largest in the southern hemisphere.

There can be up to 350,000 cars using Sydney's roads simultaneously during peak hour, leading to significant traffic congestion. 84.9% of Sydney households own a motor vehicle and 46.5% own two or more. With a rate of 26.3% in 2014, Sydney has the highest utilisation of public transport for travel to work of any Australian capital. In contrast, in 2014 only 25.2% of working residents in the City of Sydney use a car, whilst 15.8% take a train, 13.3% use a bus, and 25.3% walk. Several significant infrastructure projects have been completed since. The CBD features a series of alleyways and lanes that provide off-street vehicular access to city buildings and as well as pedestrian routes through city buildings.

==== Suburban trains ====
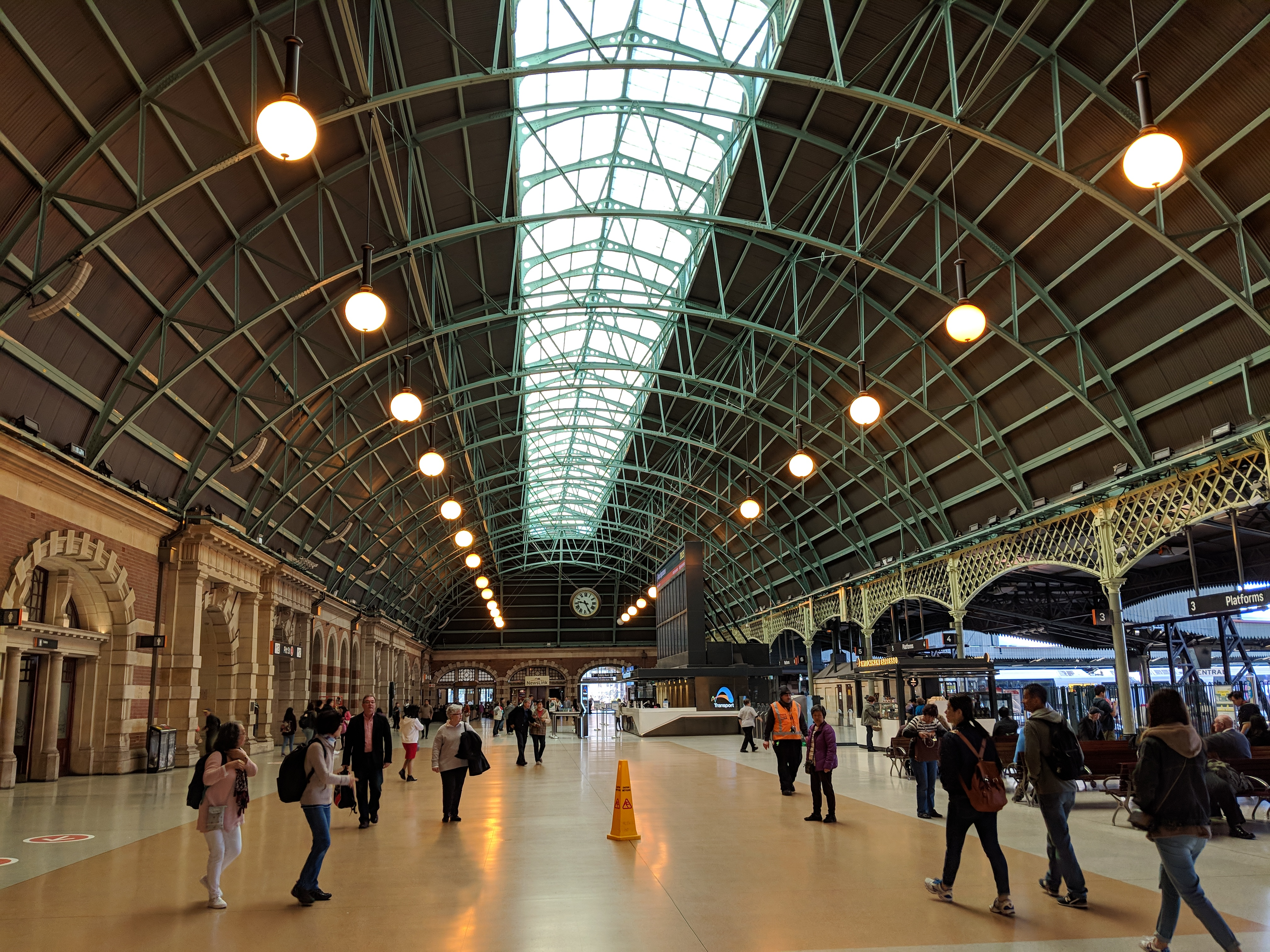
Central station is the busiest railway station in Australia, and the city's main public transport hub.

Sydney has the largest public transport network in Australia, with 67% of residents having access to adequate public transport services. Sydney's rail network began with the construction of a rail line to present-day Granville in 1855. Afterwards, the network grew with European settlement in the 19th century. In the 1850s and 1860s, the rail network reached areas that are now outer suburbs of Sydney. The first electric trains were introduced in 1926, by which point electric trams were also running. By 1991, all lines within Sydney were electrified. The rail network, as well as all public transport within Sydney, is ticketed through Opal cards, reusable and contactless cards that are used to automatically calculate and collect transport fares.

Established in 1906, Central station is the largest and busiest railway station in the state and is the main hub of the city's rail network. Sydney Trains is the suburban rail service. Its tracks form part of the New South Wales railway network. It serves 168 stations across the city and had an annual ridership of 302 million passenger journeys in 2023–24.

==== Metro ====
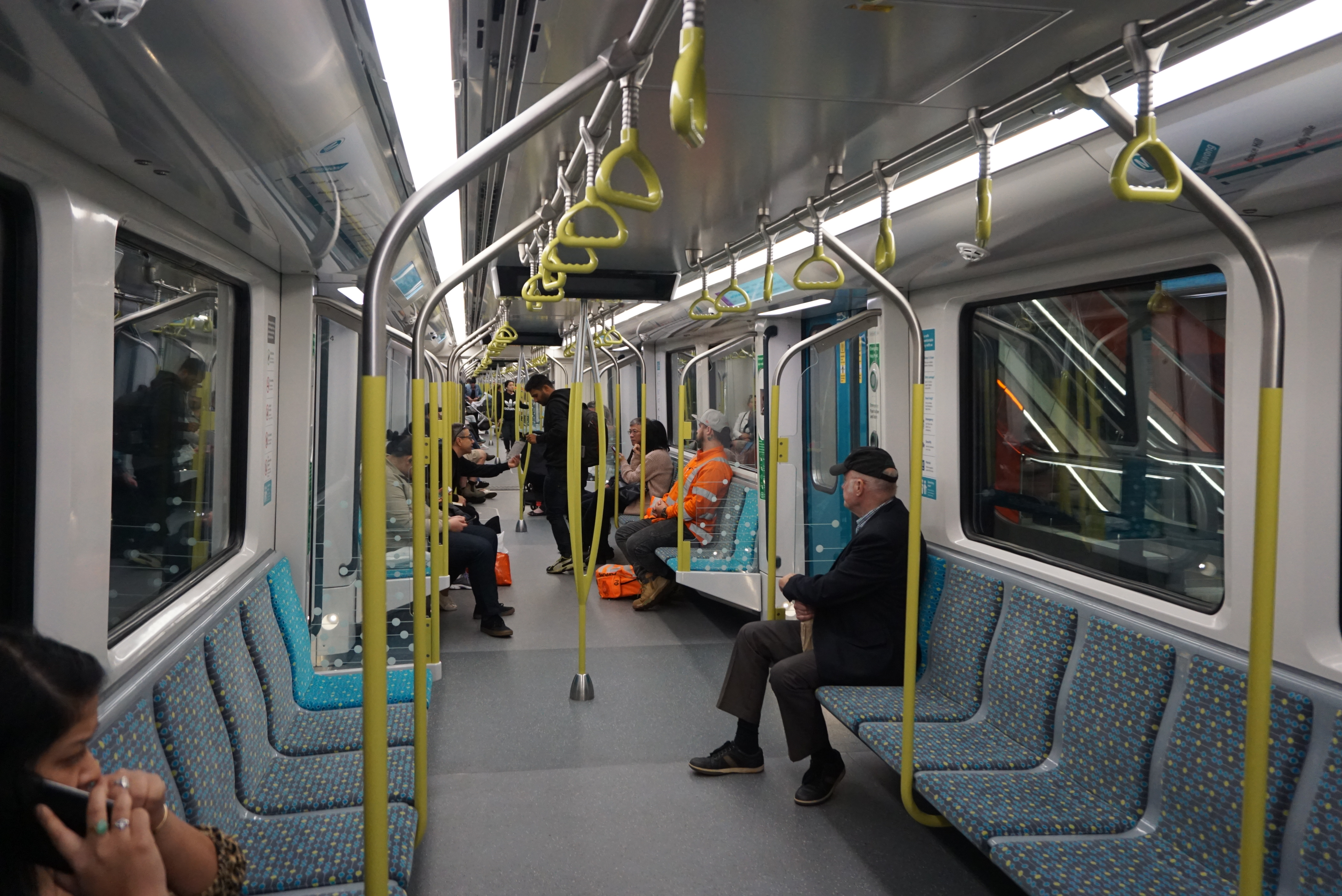
Interior of a Sydney Metro train

The Sydney Metro is a driverless rapid transit network separate from the suburban rail network, with connections at major interchange stations. Currently, the network consists of a single line extending from Tallawong in the north-west to the city and Bankstown. A new line through the inner west to Parramatta is planned to be built by 2030. It currently serves 31 stations. A line to serve the greater west is planned for 2026 and will include a station for the second international airport. Sydney Metro operates with much higher frequency than the suburban rail network, with service intervals of 3–4 minutes compared to Sydney Trains' 10–15 minutes. The scheme is intended to increase Sydney's public transport capacity by 60%.

==== Light rail ====
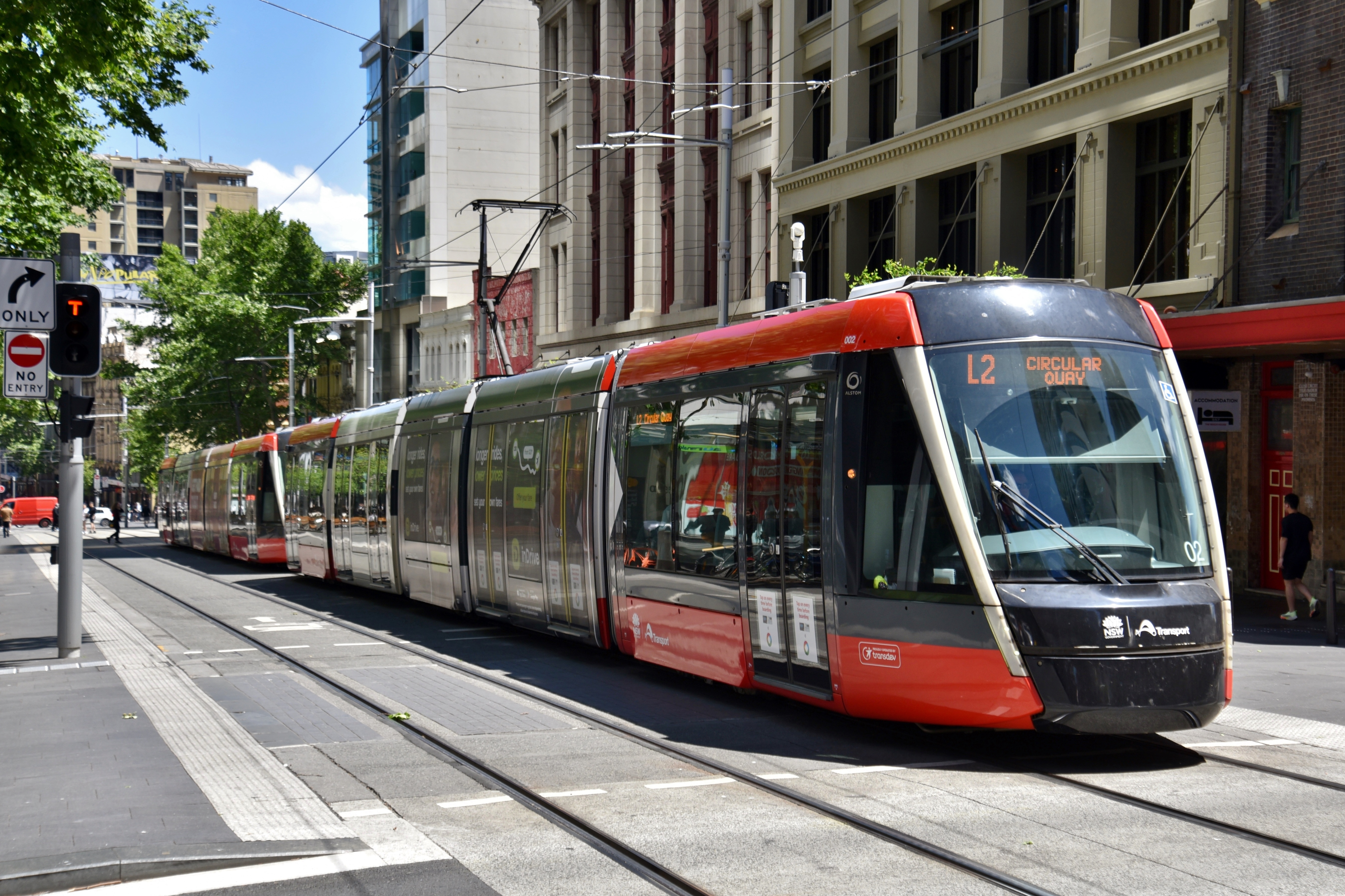
The CBD and South East Light Rail connects Sydney's CBD with the Eastern Suburbs.

Sydney once had one of the largest tram networks in the British Empire after London. It served routes covering 291 km (181 mi). With the advent of motor buses they came to be viewed as more flexible than trams, one factor leading to them superseding tram services, leading to the progressive closure of the network with the final tram operating in 1961. From 1930 there were 612 buses across Sydney carrying 90 million passengers per annum.

In 1997, the Inner West Light Rail opened between Central station and Wentworth Park. It ran on a freight line extending from the city to Darling Harbour and the Fish Markets, part of the Metropolitan Goods Lines. The line was extended to Lilyfield in 2000 and then Dulwich Hill in 2014. It links the Inner West and Darling Harbour with Central station and facilitated 9.1 million journeys in the 2016–17 financial year. A second, the CBD and South East Light Rail 12 km (7.5 mi) line serving the CBD and Eastern Suburbs opened in 2019–2020. A light rail line serving the western hub of Parramatta opened in 2024. The project is divided into two stages, with the first (the L4) replacing the Carlingford railway line that closed in 2020. The second stage of the project, the L5, servicing the Olympic park, is currently under construction.

==== Buses ====
Bus services are conducted by private operators under contract to Transport for NSW. Opal cards are used on bus routes as they are with all public transport in Sydney. In total, nearly 225 million boardings were recorded across the bus network. NightRide is a nightly bus service that operates between midnight and 5am.

==== Ferries ====
A Freshwater-class ferry at Port Jackson.

At the time the Sydney Harbour Bridge opened in 1932, the city's ferry service was the largest in the world. Patronage declined from 37 million passengers in 1945 to 11 million in 1963 but has recovered somewhat in recent years. From its hub at Circular Quay, the ferry network extends from Manly to Parramatta. Ferries in sydney are operated by Transdev Sydney Ferries and operate on 10 routes across the harbour and Parramatta River.

==== Airports ====
Sydney's main airport is Sydney Kingsford Smith Airport, which is located in Mascot, and serves 46 international and 23 domestic destinations. As the busiest airport in Australia, it handled 37.9 million passengers in 2013 and 530,000 tonnes of freight in 2011. Sydney's secondary airport, Western Sydney Airport, opened on 25 October 2026 at Badgerys Creek, at the cost of $5.3 billion. Notably, it does not feature a curfew, unlike Sydney Kingsford Smith Airport, which imposes a suspension of all aircraft operations between 11 pm and 6 am. Bankstown Airport is Sydney's main general aviation airport, and serves general aviation, charter and some scheduled cargo flights. Other airports include Camden Airport, The Oaks Airfield, and Menangle Airfield, which are mostly used for general aviation, flight training and by private operators. Seaplane terminals are located at Rose Bay and Palm Beach, and military airports at Holsworthy and Richmond.

=== Utilities ===
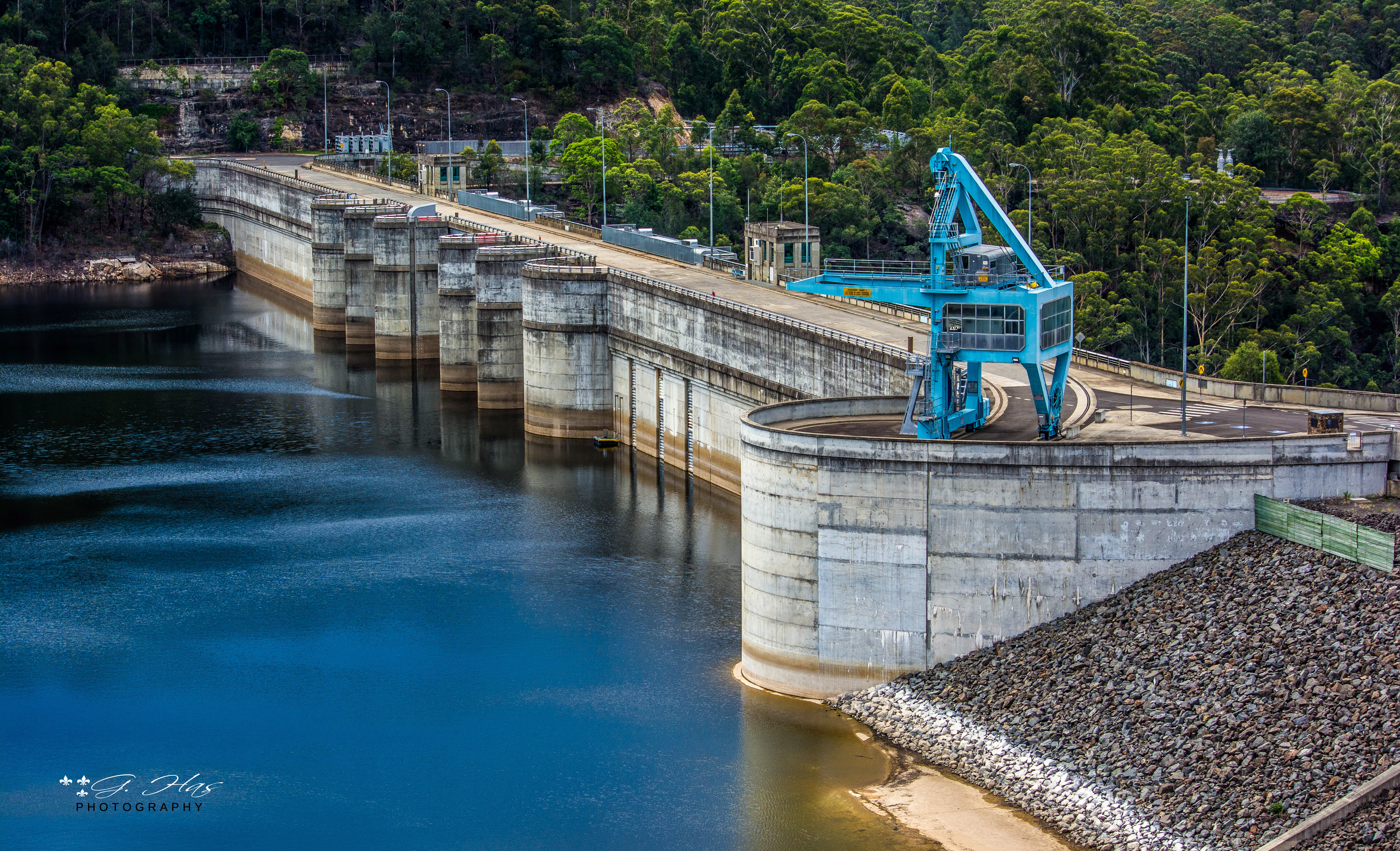
Warragamba Dam is Sydney's largest water supply dam.

Obtaining sufficient fresh water was difficult during early colonial times. A catchment called the Tank Stream sourced water from what is now the CBD but was little more than an open sewer by the end of the 1700s. The Botany Swamps Scheme was one of several ventures during the mid-1800s that saw the construction of wells, tunnels, steam pumping stations, and small dams to service Sydney's growing population.

The Upper Nepean Scheme came into operation in 1886. It transports water 100 km (62 mi) from the Nepean, Cataract, and Cordeaux rivers and continues to service about 15% of Sydney's water needs. Dams were built on these three rivers between 1907 and 1935. In 1977 the Shoalhaven Scheme brought several more dams into service.

The state-owned corporation WaterNSW now manages eleven major dams: Warragamba, one of the largest domestic water supply dams in the world, Woronora, Cataract, Cordeaux, Nepean, Avon, Wingecarribee Reservoir, Fitzroy Falls Reservoir, Tallowa, the Blue Mountains Dams, and Prospect Reservoir. Water is collected from five catchment areas covering 16,000 km^{2} (6,178 mi^{2}) and total storage amounts to 2.6 TL (0.6 mi^{3}). The Sydney Desalination Plant came into operation in 2010. WaterNSW supplies bulk water to Sydney Water, a state-owned corporation that operates water distribution, sewerage and storm water management services.

Sydney's electricity infrastructure is maintained by Ausgrid and Endeavour Energy. Their combined networks include over 815,000 poles and 83,000 km (52,000 mi) of cables. Submarine communications cable systems in Sydney include the Australia–Japan Cable, Telstra Endeavour and the Southern Cross Cable, which link Australia and countries in the Pacific.

== Environmental issues and pollution reduction ==
=== Air quality ===
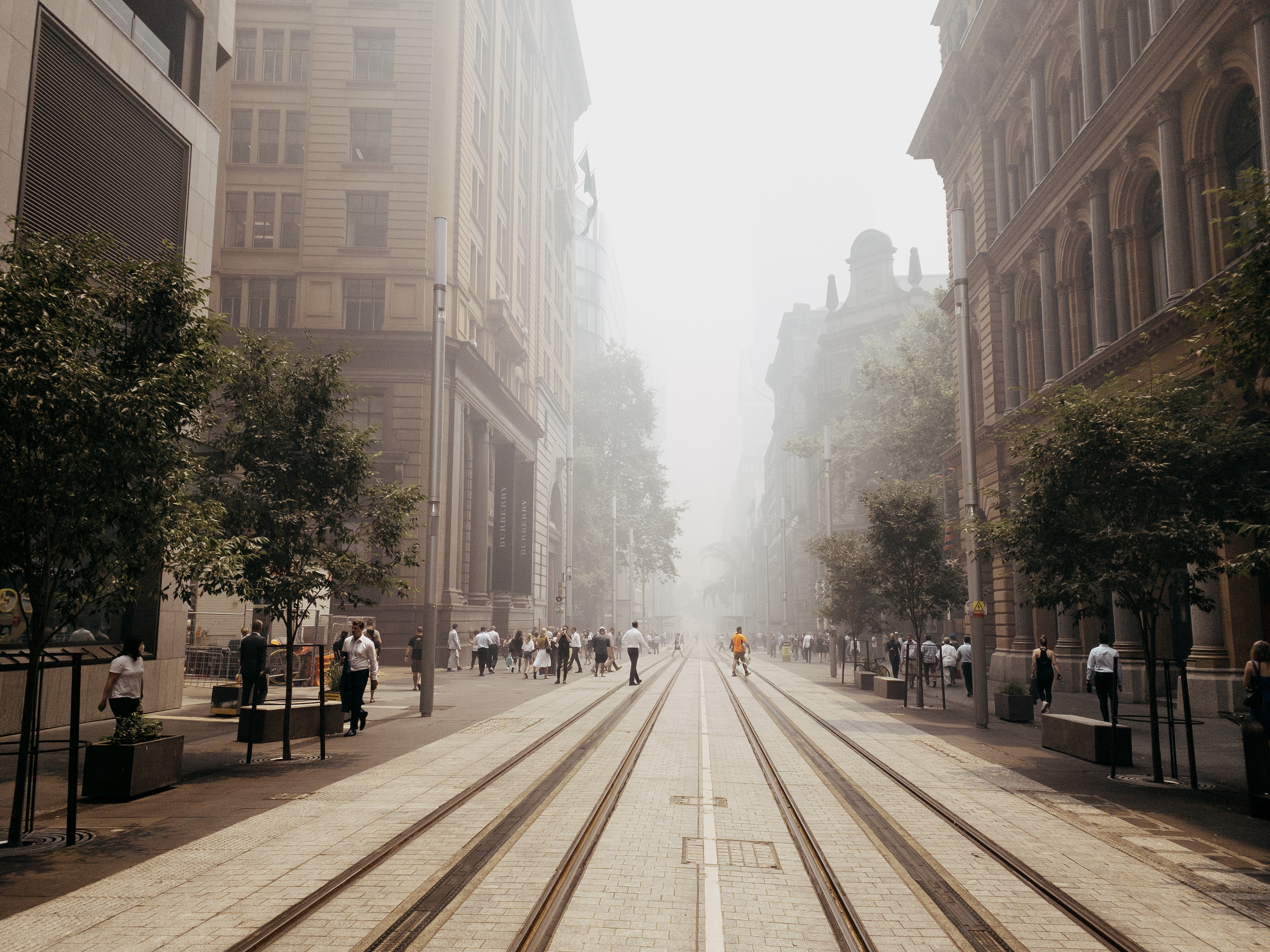
George Street and bushfire smoke in December 2019

As climate change, greenhouse gas emissions and pollution have become a major issue for Australia, Sydney has in the past been criticised for its lack of focus on reducing pollution and emissions and maintaining water quality. The release of the Metropolitan Air Quality Scheme (MAQS) led to a broader understanding of the causation of pollution in Sydney, allowing the government to form appropriate responses.

The 2019–20 Australian bushfire season significantly impacted outer Sydney and dramatically reduced air quality, leading to a smoky haze that lingered for days. The air quality was 11 times the hazardous level in some days, worse than New Delhi's; it was compared to "smoking 32 cigarettes" by Brian Oliver, a respiratory diseases scientist at the University of Technology Sydney. Since Sydney is surrounded by bushland and forest, bushfires can ring the region in a natural phenomena that is labelled "ring of fire".

The City of Sydney became the first council in Australia to achieve formal certification as carbon-neutral in 2008. The city has reduced its 2007 carbon emissions by 6% and since 2006 has reduced carbon emissions from city buildings by up to 20%. The Sustainable Sydney 2030 program presented a guide to reducing energy in homes and offices by 30%. Reductions in energy consumption have slashed energy bills by $30 million a year. Solar panels have been established on many CBD buildings to minimise carbon pollution by around 3,000 tonnes a year.

The city also has an "urban forest growth strategy", in which it aims to regularly increase the tree coverage in the city by frequently planting trees with strong leaf density and vegetation to provide cleaner air and create moisture during hot weather, thus lowering city temperatures. Sydney has also become a leader in the development of green office buildings and enforcing the requirement of all building proposals to be energy-efficient. The One Central Park development, completed in 2013, is an example of this implementation.

=== Car-dependency ===
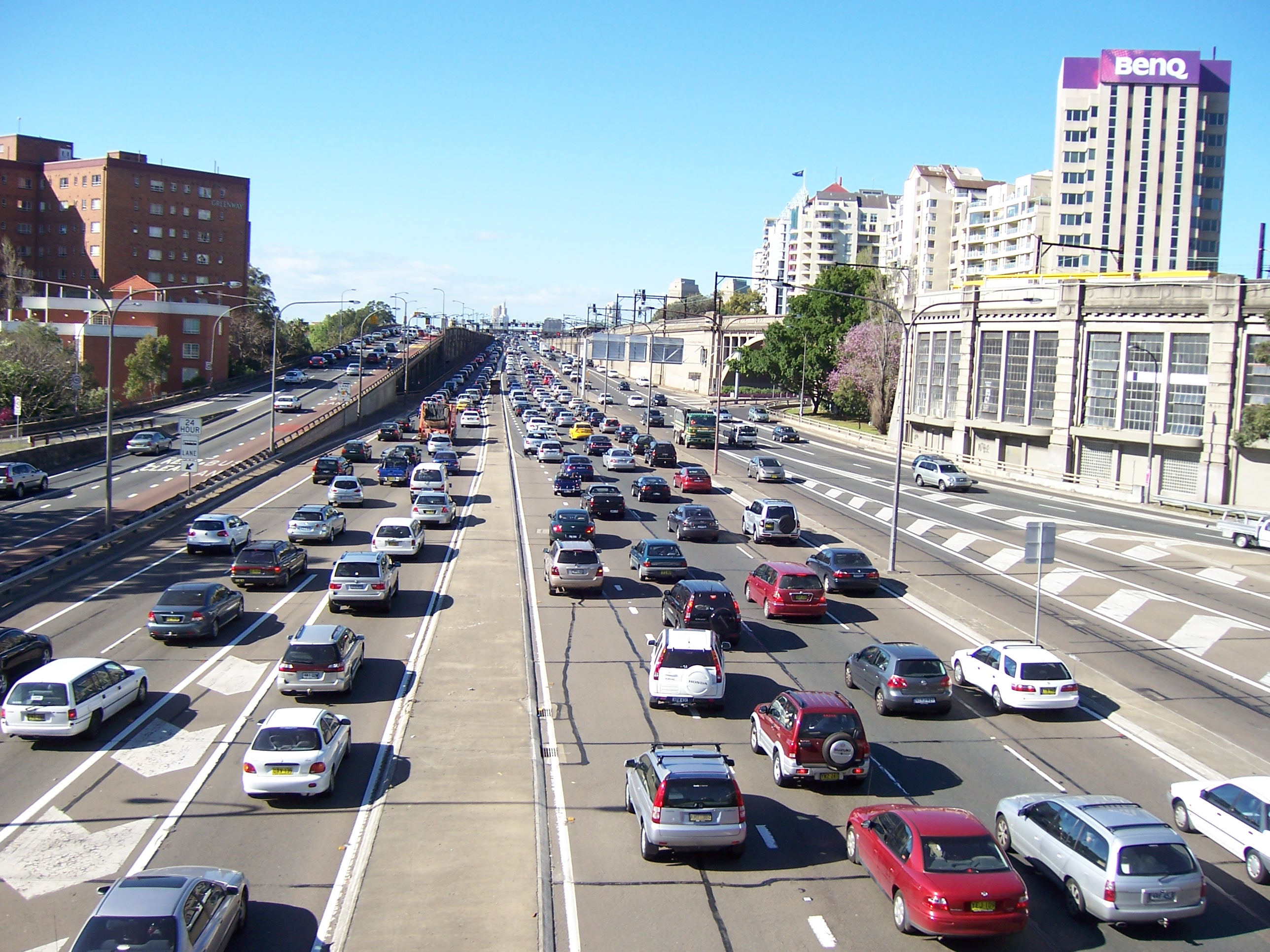
Traffic congestion on the Warringah Freeway, Milsons Point

Australian cities are some of the most car-dependent cities in the world, especially by world city standards, although Sydney's is the lowest of Australia's major cities at 66%. Sydney also has the highest usage of public transport in an Australian city, at 27%–comparable with New York City, Shanghai and Berlin. Despite its high ranking for an Australian city, Sydney has a low level of public transport services, with a historically low-density layout and significant urban sprawl, thus increasing the likelihood of car dependency.

Strategies have been implemented to reduce private vehicle pollution by encouraging public transport, initiating the development of high density housing and introducing a fleet of 10 new electric cars, the largest order of the pollution-free vehicle in Australia. Electric cars do not produce carbon monoxide and nitrous oxide, which contribute to climate change. Cycling trips increased by 113% across Sydney's inner-city from 2010 to 2015, at which point about 2,000 bikes were passing through top peak-hour intersections on an average weekday. Transport developments in the north-west and east of the city have been designed to encourage use of the expanding public transportation system.

== Sister cities ==
Sister cities of Sydney include:

- San Francisco, United States of America
- Wellington, New Zealand
- Florence, Italy
- Nagoya, Japan
- Portsmouth, United Kingdom
- Guangzhou, China

== See also ==
- List of museums in Sydney
- List of people from Sydney
- List of public art in the City of Sydney
- List of songs about Sydney
- Outline of Sydney
