= Angel Place (alleyway) =

Laneway in Sydney

Coordinates: 33°52′01″S 151°12′27″E

Angel Place, Sydney
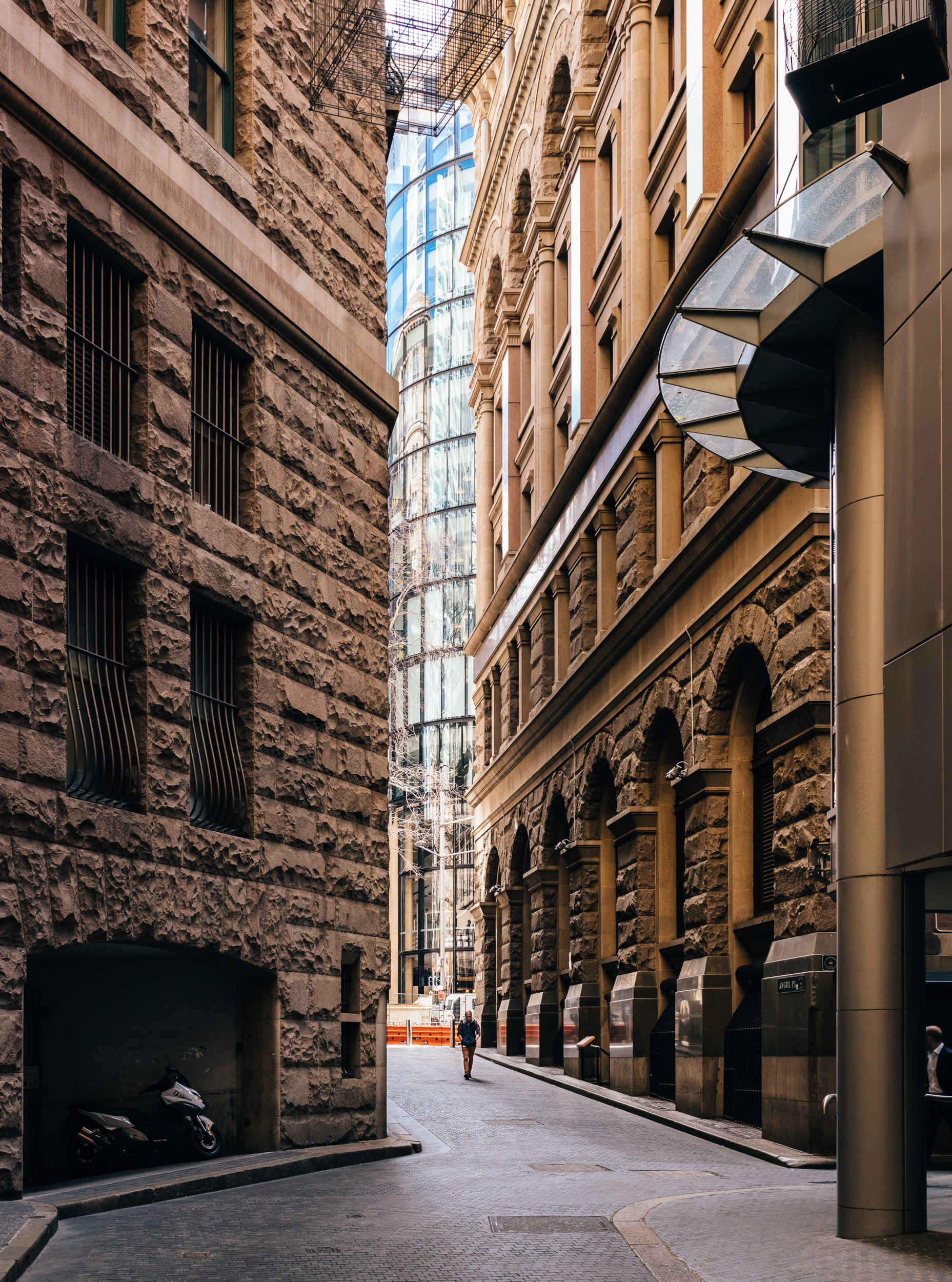
- Angel Place view, facing east
- Interactive map of Angel Place, Sydney
- Location: Sydney, New South Wales, Australia
- Nearest metro station: Martin Place; Wynyard
- Coordinates: 33°52'01"S 151°12'27"E
- North: Hunter Street
- East: Pitt Street
- South: Martin Place
- West: George Street

Angel Place is an alleyway located in the Sydney central business district, close to George Street and Martin Place. The lane is known for its restaurants and artworks, including the installation Forgotten Songs, which was installed in 2009. It is also known for being the location of the City Recital Hall.

== Artwork ==
Since 2009, Angel Place has been the location of Forgotten Songs, an installation by Australian artist Michael Hill. The work was originally part of a broader installation series called By George! Hidden Networks, the artwork was originally temporary. Other installations of the series have been removed, but Forgotten Songs was made permanent in 2012. The artwork is a tribute to the coexistence of native bird populations with the human environment, as well as the destruction of local bird habitats. Forgotten Songs plays sounds of birds that once resided in the Central Sydney area. The sounds change from day to night, showcasing nocturnal birds that resided in Central Sydney.
