= Lanes and alleyways of Sydney =

Series of passageways in Sydney, Australia

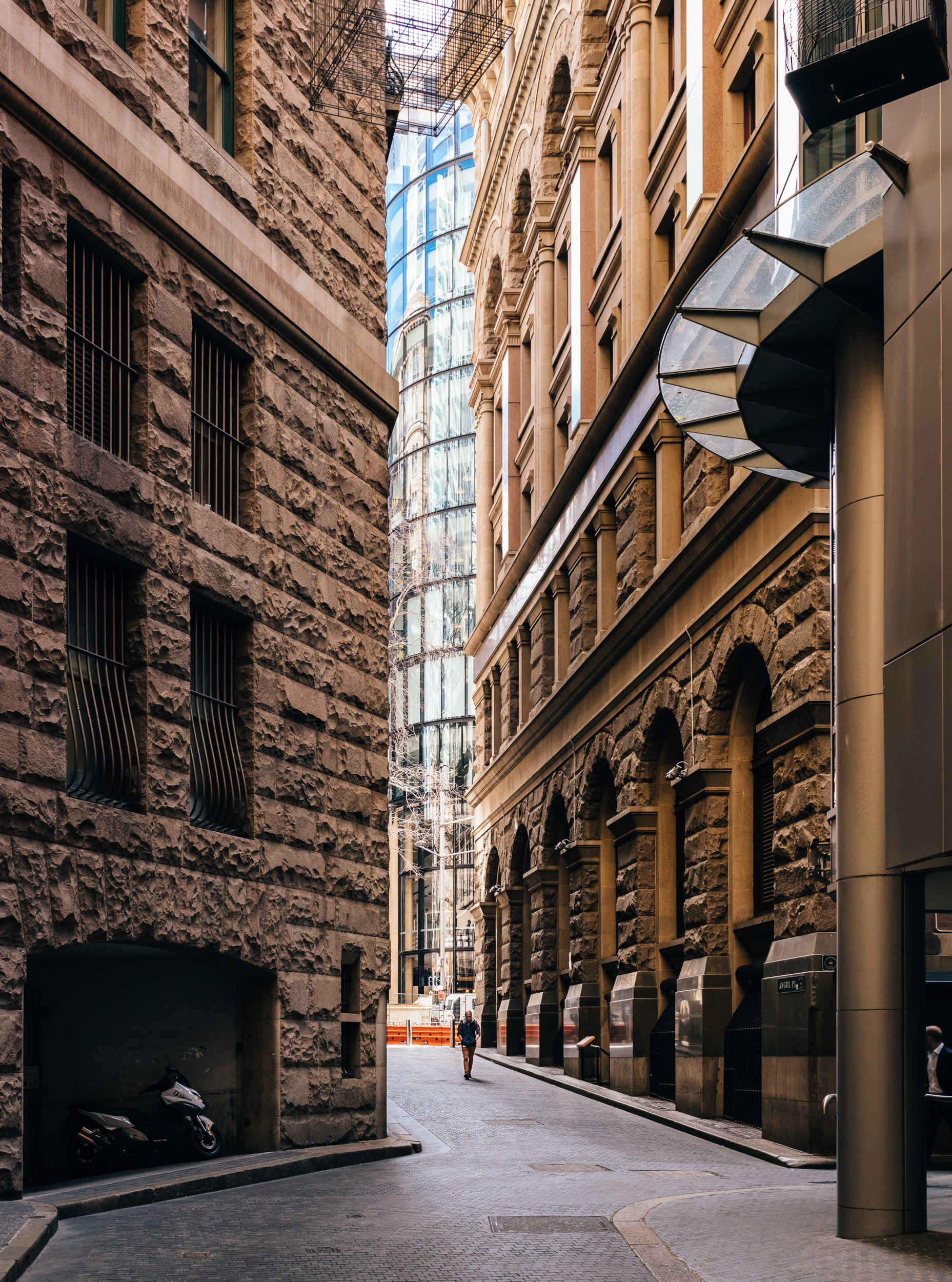
Angel Place

The lanes and alleyways of Sydney are a series of passageways found in Sydney central business district that have historically functioned by providing both off-street vehicular access to city buildings and secondary pedestrian routes through city blocks. They generally feature street art, cafes, restaurants, bars and retail outlets. The Rocks has the most prominent and historical laneways in Sydney, which date to the 19th century. Forgotten Songs is a popular attraction found in Angel Place.

The bulk of the laneways are found at George Street and Pitt Street. Chinatown also features a number of lanes, alleys and arcades. There are around 107 individual lanes in Sydney CBD, where they are demarcated by four precincts; Northern CBD, Central CBD, Western CBD and Southern CBD.

== History ==
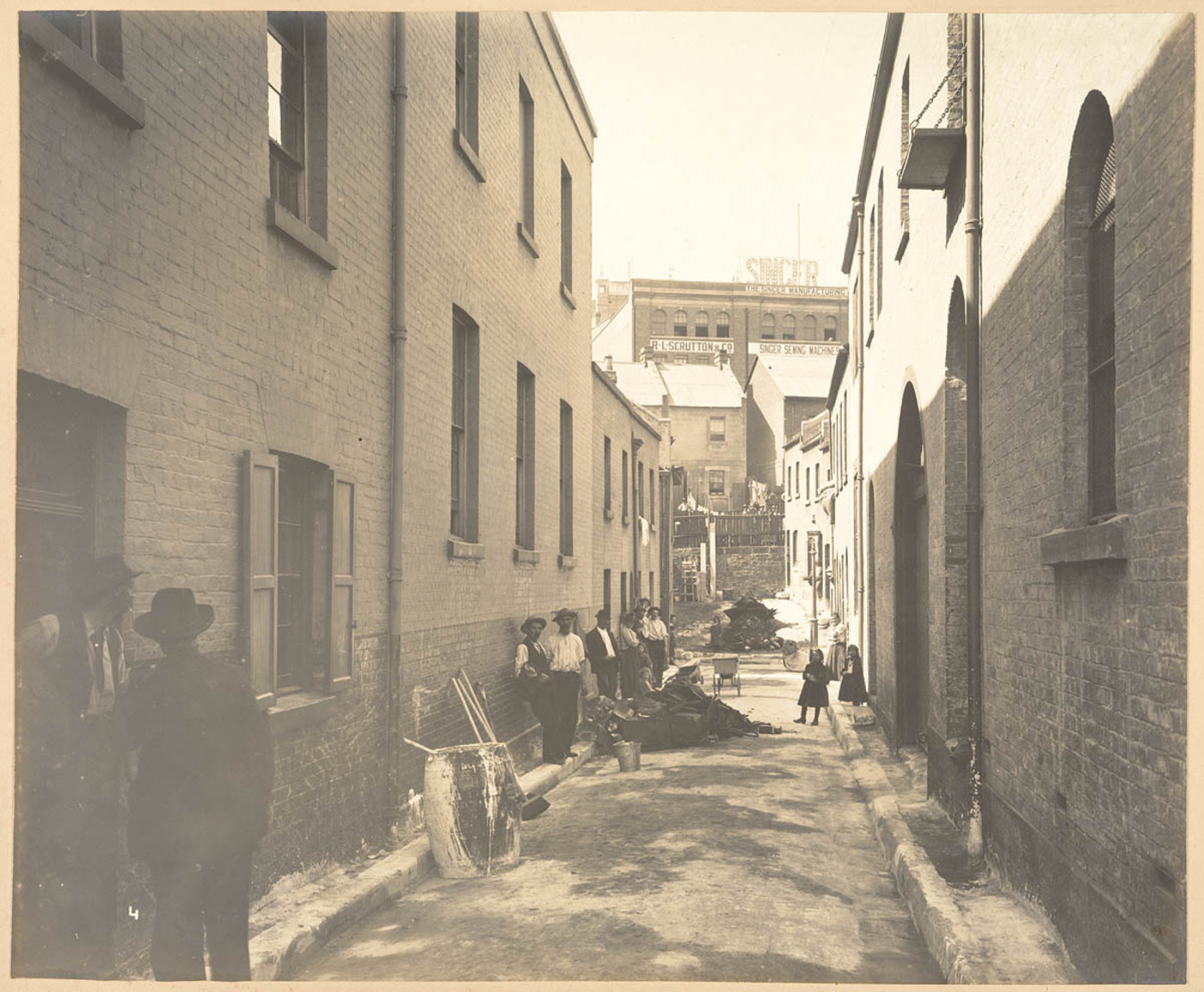
Batson's Lane, near Sussex Street, 1900

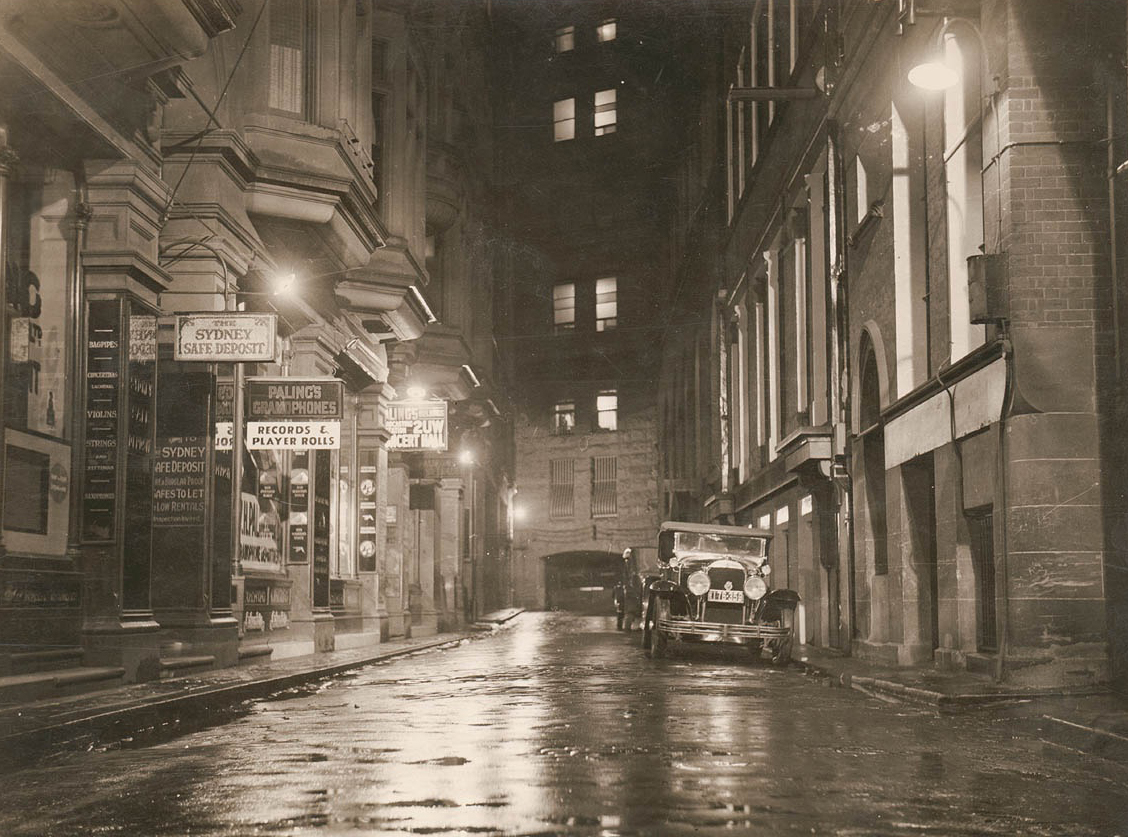
Angel Place in the 1930s.

Unlike the controlled grid pattern of planned cities such as Melbourne and Adelaide, the lanes of Sydney developed as a consequence to commercial objectives and antecedent circulation patterns. Therefore, it can be assumed that all lanes have a level of importance in the city. The evolution of the lanes can be traced from 1854 to the present day. By the year 1912, the CBD had accomplished an urban shape which stayed comparatively unvarying through to about 1948. By that year, a complex and indeterminable network of small streets and lanes were evident. By 1969, the pattern of site integration and the deconstruction of lanes had begun with the establishment of Australia Square, AMP and Gold Fields House.

Heritage buildings found on several lanes echo the industrial past of many of the lanes such Central Street, Albion Street and Bulletin Place. Bulletin Place and Abercrombie Lane were trendy spots for restaurants. Picture records show that Rowe Street had a long history as a retail area. The practice of Council selling lanes dates from the early 20th century. From the 1960s through to the late 1980s, over twenty-five sales of lanes or parts of lanes were transacted by Council, totaling a sum of 57 million dollars. This resulted in the loss of unique retail areas such as Rowe Street and Angel Place, and as well as loss of context for heritage buildings such as those found in Bulletin Place, Central Street and Albion Street.

=== Revitalisation ===
On February 24, 1992, the council imposed a postponement on the sale of lanes due to their heritage significance. From the early 1990s, a number of lanes around Circular Quay, Martin Place and Australia Square began redevelopment.

In June 2009, City of Sydney Council picked eight CBD laneways for public domain improvements, where they later included a ninth laneway. These were, Bulletin Place, Angel Place, Hosking and Penfold Place, Lees Court, Ash Street, York Lane, Albion Place, Central Street, and Wilmot Street. Between 2010 and 2016, redevelopments were completed in those lanes, with most of these precincts gaining new businesses and increased economic vibrancy.

More than 10 lanes began revitalisation starting from 2021, with the City of Sydney announcing a plan to modify laneways throughout the CBD by establishing new pedestrian walkways and art installations as part of the revivification proposal that will last a decade. This would include more fresco style dining and increased pedestrian access from George Street. Around 25 lanes were upgraded with the installation of bars, restaurants, retail outlets and art installations by the City of Sydney in a span of 15 years, beginning from 2007. In 2021-22, upgrading had taken place in Barlow Street, St Laurence Lane, Curtin Place, Hamilton Street, Little Hunter Street, Randle Lane, York Lane, Wynyard Lane, Underwood Street and Dalley Street.

== Significant lanes ==
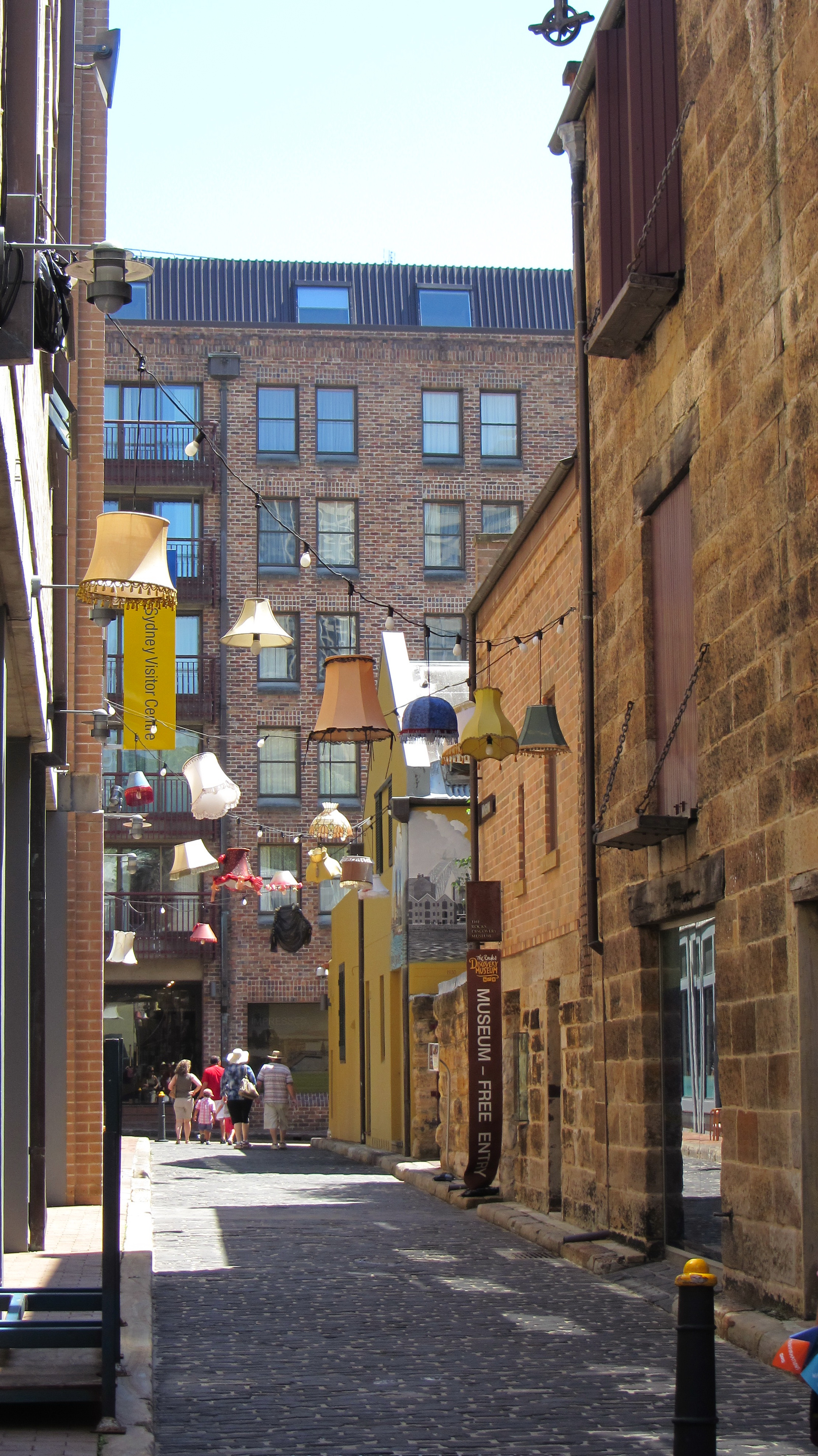
Kendall Lane

Abercrombie Lane forms a portion of formerly vital pedestrian network delimited by George, Bridge and Pitt Streets, where it connects through NZI House to Bond Street and Australia Square, and provides the possibility to recapture a pedestrian district with a specific scale and quality in the CBD. The lane has a long history as part of Sydney's pedestrian network, where it makes an appearance on William Well's 1850 map of Sydney.

Wynyard Lane allows vehicle access to structures on George and Carrington Streets. Manning Lane goes through Bridge and Dalley Street, where it provides a shortcut through the building midway between George and Pitt Street. Phillip Lane allows vehicle entry to buildings on Phillip Street and Macquarie Street. Sussex Lane is parallel to Kent Street and is characterised by several terraced stores, in addition to featuring Waterside Workers' Federation Building, a heritage listed edifice. York Lane is a crucial laneway that provides access to heritage building sites and as well as access for vehicles and pedestrians. James Lane represents a number of 19th-century industrial-style buildings, and it still maintains its original form. Rawson Lane near Pitt Street features heritage buildings and a view of the clock tower at the Central railway station.

Ash Street was developed in 1886 where it featured luxurious 19th- and early 20th-century structures. Palings Lane is described by the Local Environmental Plans as a "rare example of a pedestrian route created when the north-south street grid was formed in early Victorian Sydney". Market Row features heritage-listed buildings and is defined by its significant architecture. Douglas Lane is surrounded by George, Liverpool, Sussex and Goulburn Streets and was a crucial lane for the city in the industrial age. Kimber Lane is situated in Chinatown where it is perpendicular to Dixon Street and is of cultural significance. De Maistre Place features the Watson House and has pedestrian routes from Pitt and Hunter Street to Wynyard station.

Some lanes such as those within Rowe Street provide an advantageous secondary path, allowing pedestrians the choice of averting crowded and noisy city streets. Lanes such as Tankstream Way are important heritage items identified and others listed in conservation areas are conducive elements, intrinsic to the quality and character of those areas. Angel Place is part of a unique pedestrian precinct that was once enhanced by retail stores at ground floor. Dalley Street is pivotal for pedestrian and vehicular access and also for access to heritage buildings.

=== List ===
Lanes, alleyways and arcades in the city include:

- Bakehouse Place
- Surgeons Court
- Mill Lane
- Suez Canal
- Deans Place
- Temperance Lane
- Carahers Lane
- St Laurence Lane
- Maori Lane
- McElhone Place
- Atchison Lane
- Longs Lane
- Greenway Lane
- Nurses Walk
- Cribbs Lane
- Kendall Lane
- Angel Place
- Ash Street
- Crown Lane
- Cammeraygal Place
- May Lane
- Caroline Lane
- Kimber Lane
- Palings Lane
- Tank Stream Way
- Penfold Lane
- Randle Lane
- York Lane
- Mary’s Place
- Llankelly Place
- Skittle Lane
- Strand Arcade
- Wynyard Lane
- Underwood Street
- Argyle Lane
- Dalgety Terrace
- Ferry Lane
- High Lane
- Lance Lane
- Roden's Lane
- Windmill Steps
- Abercrombie Lane
- Blue Anchor Lane
- Bridge Lane
- Bulletin Place
- Crane Place
- Curtin Place
- Customs House Lane
- Dalley Street
- DeMestre Place
- Empire Lane
- Hamilton Street
- Little Hunter Street
- Loftus Lane
- Margaret Lane
- Reiby Place
- Underwood Lane
- Mooreore Stairs
- Clarence Lane
- Gas Lane
- Sussex Lane
- James Lane
- Newton Lane
- Mark Lane
- Barrack Lane
- Manning Lane
- Rawson Lane
- Hosking Place
- State Theatre Laneway
- Hargrave Lane
- Market Row
- Douglas Lane
- Foy Lane
- Nithsdale Lane
- Wright Lane
- Bijou Lane
- Dungate Lane
- Foster Lane
- Goulburn Lane
- Hands Lane
- Parker Lane
- Beattie Lane
- Beauchamp Lane

== Gallery ==
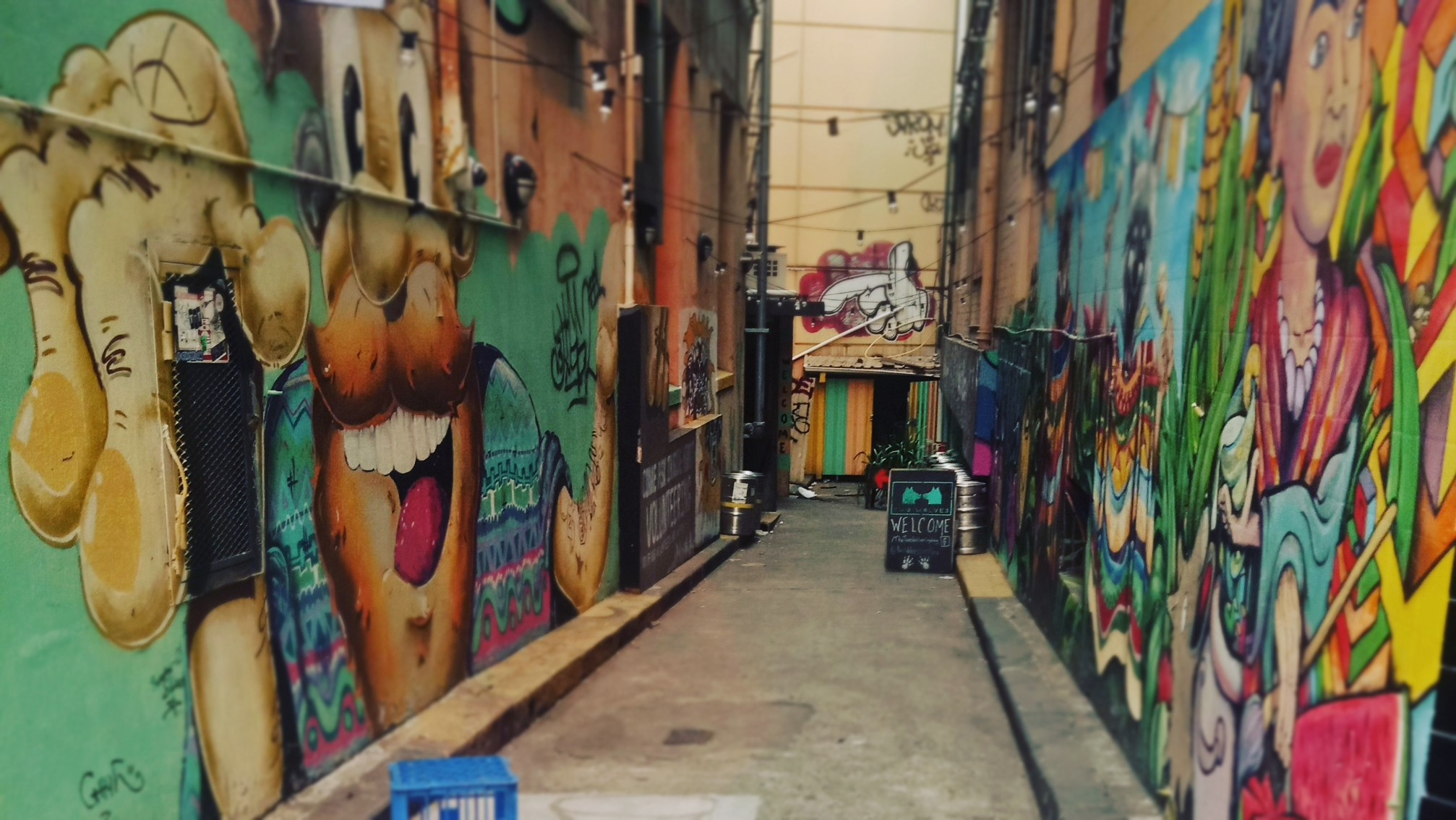
Decorative alleyway near the Lansdowne Hotel

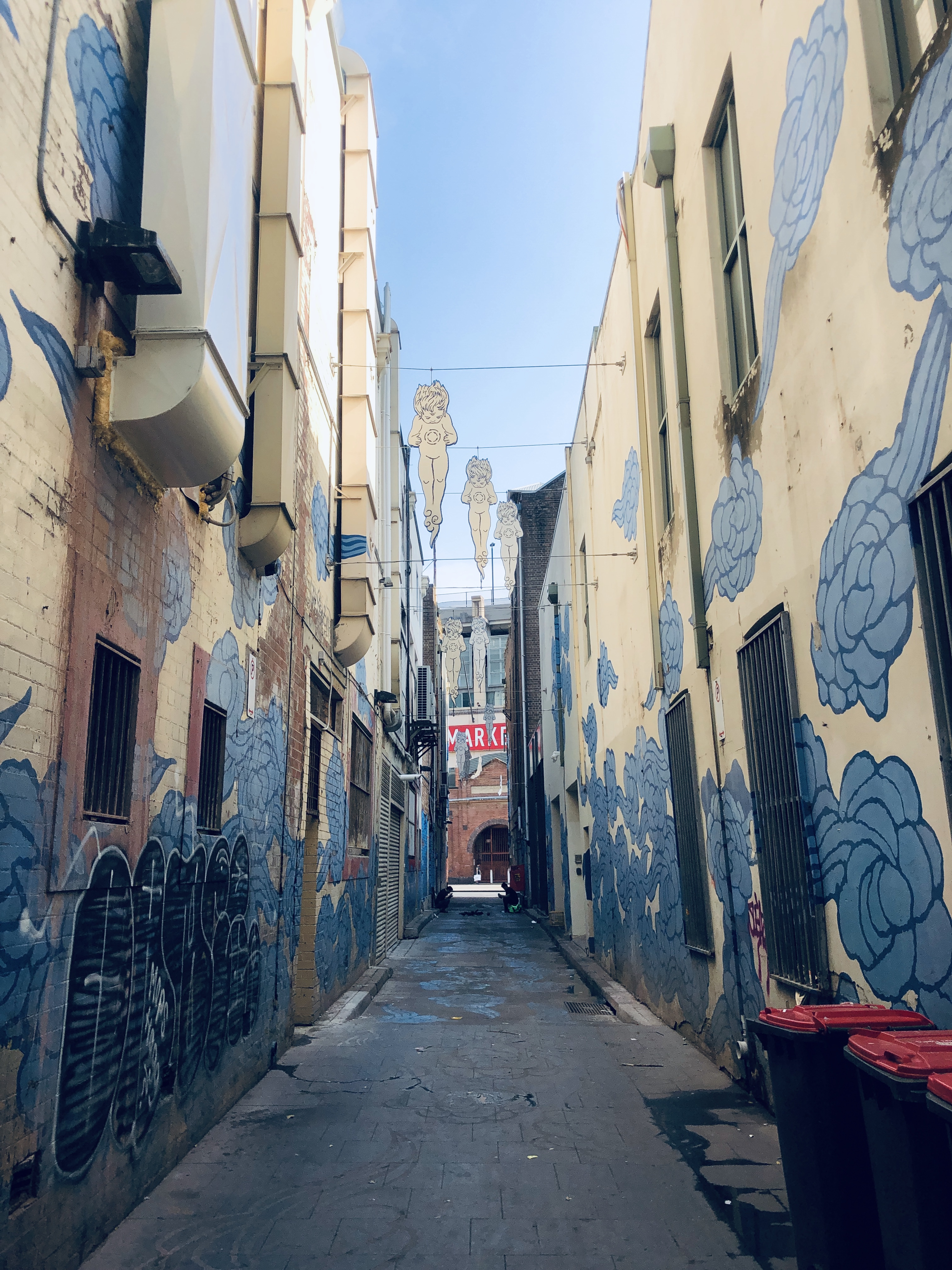
Kimber Lane

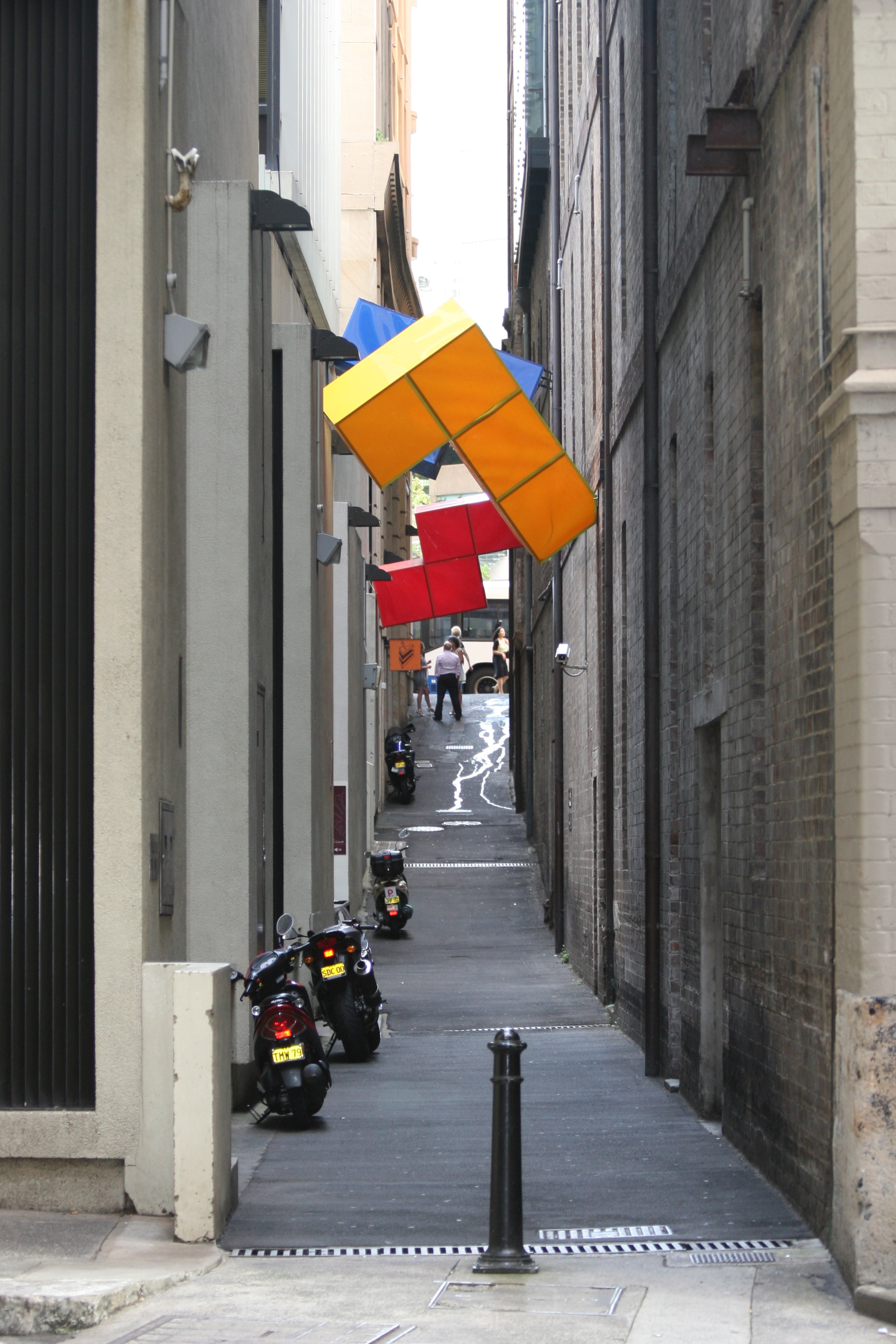
Abercrombie Lane

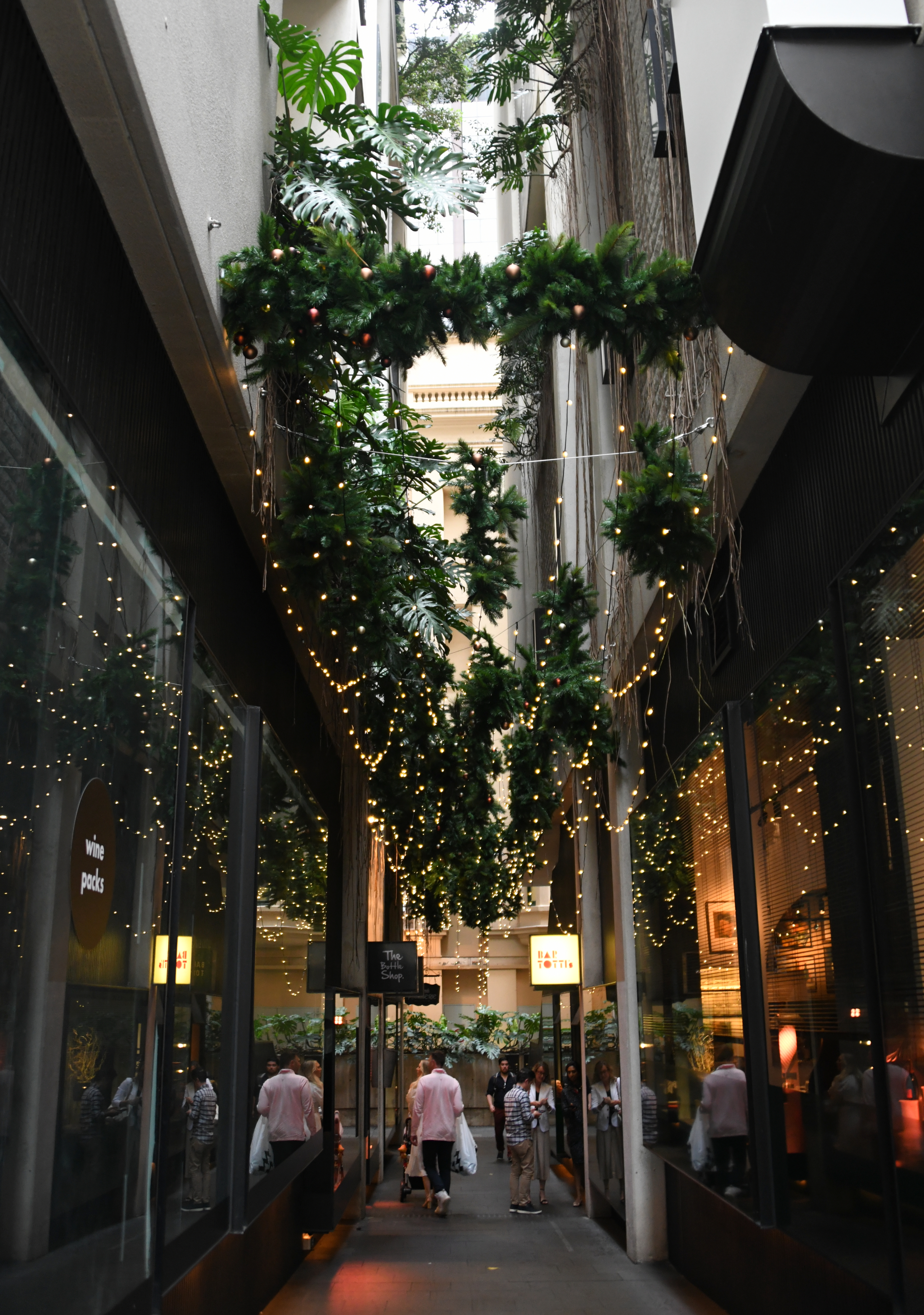
Palings Lane

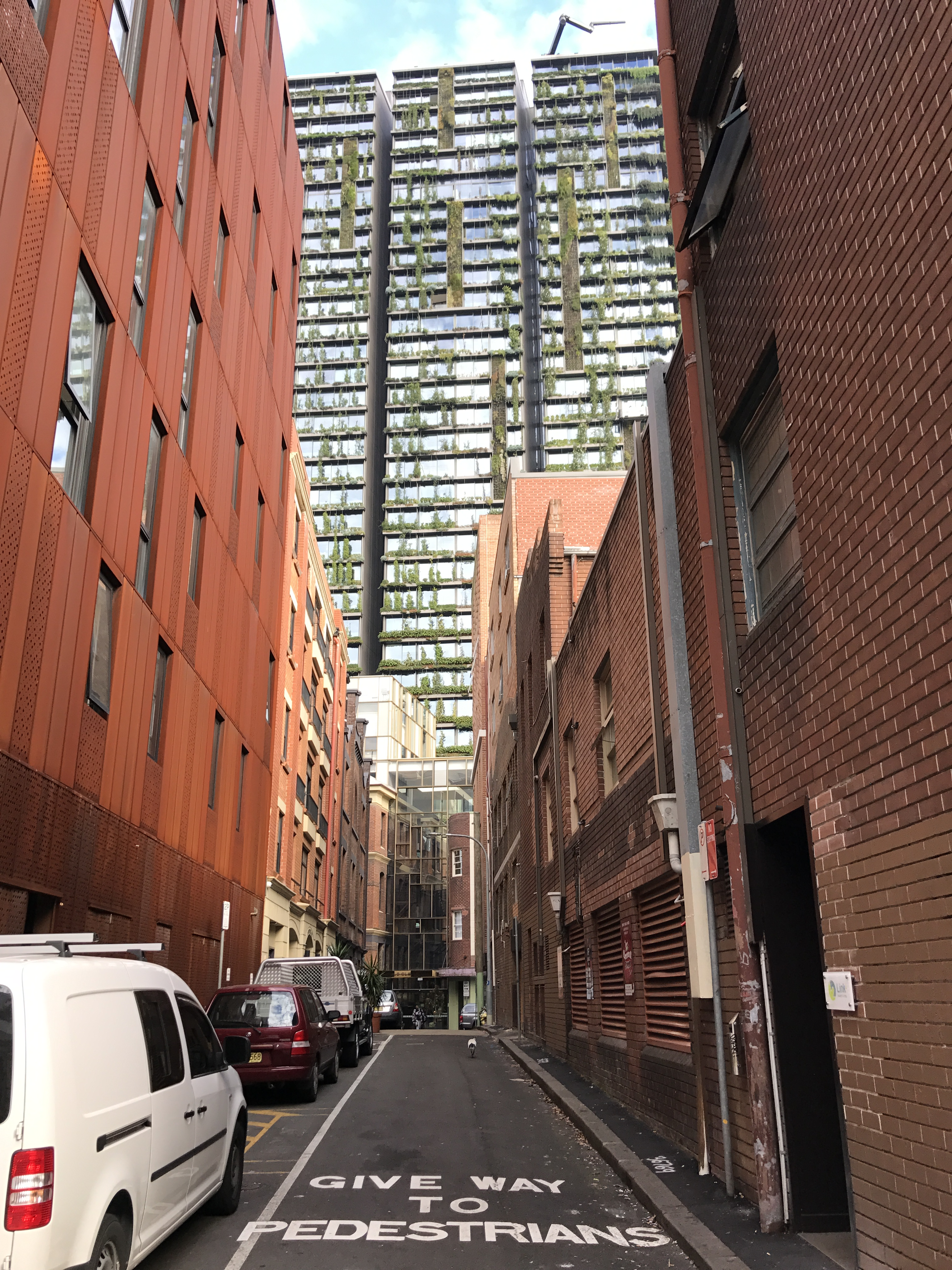
Lane in Chippendale

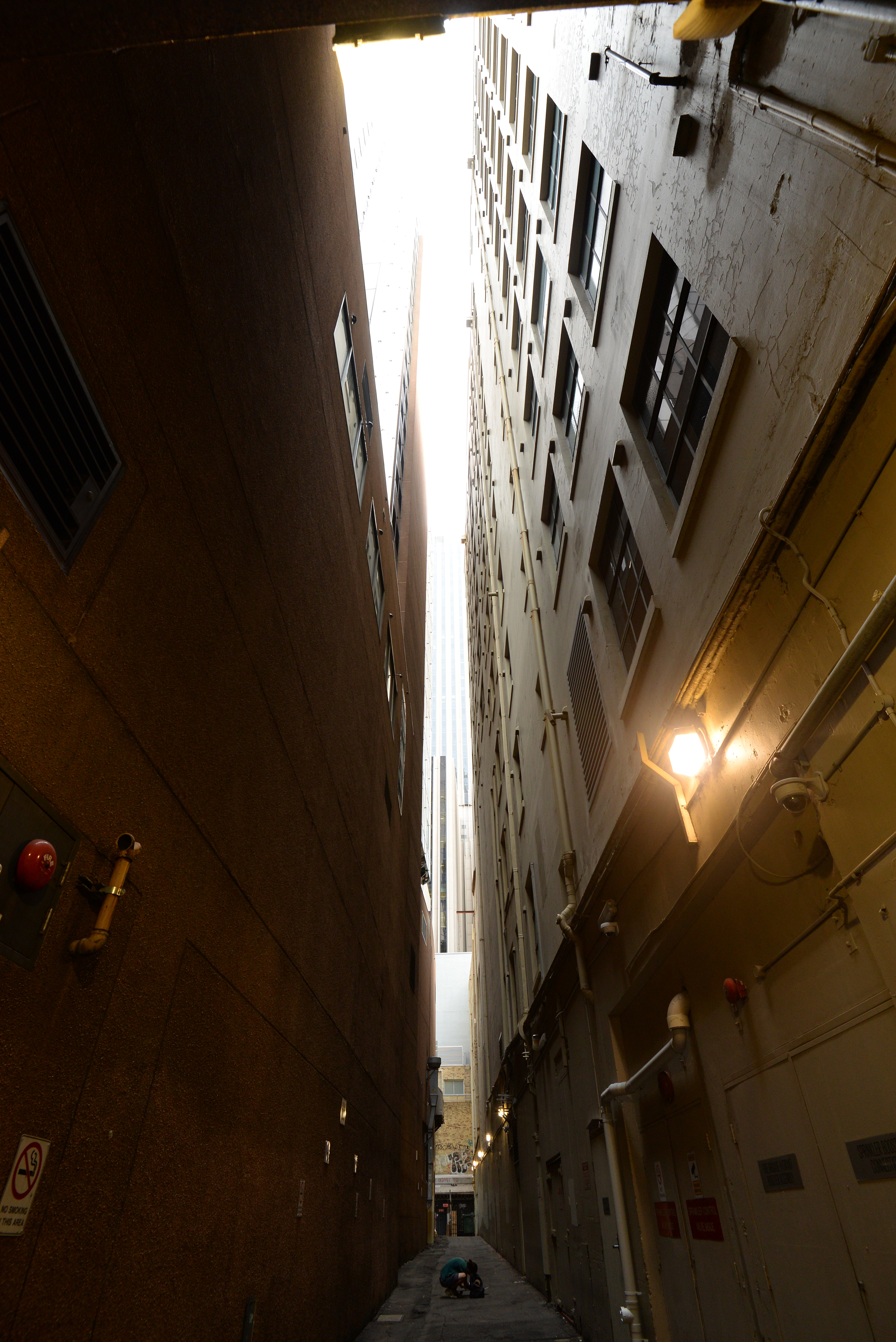
Market Row

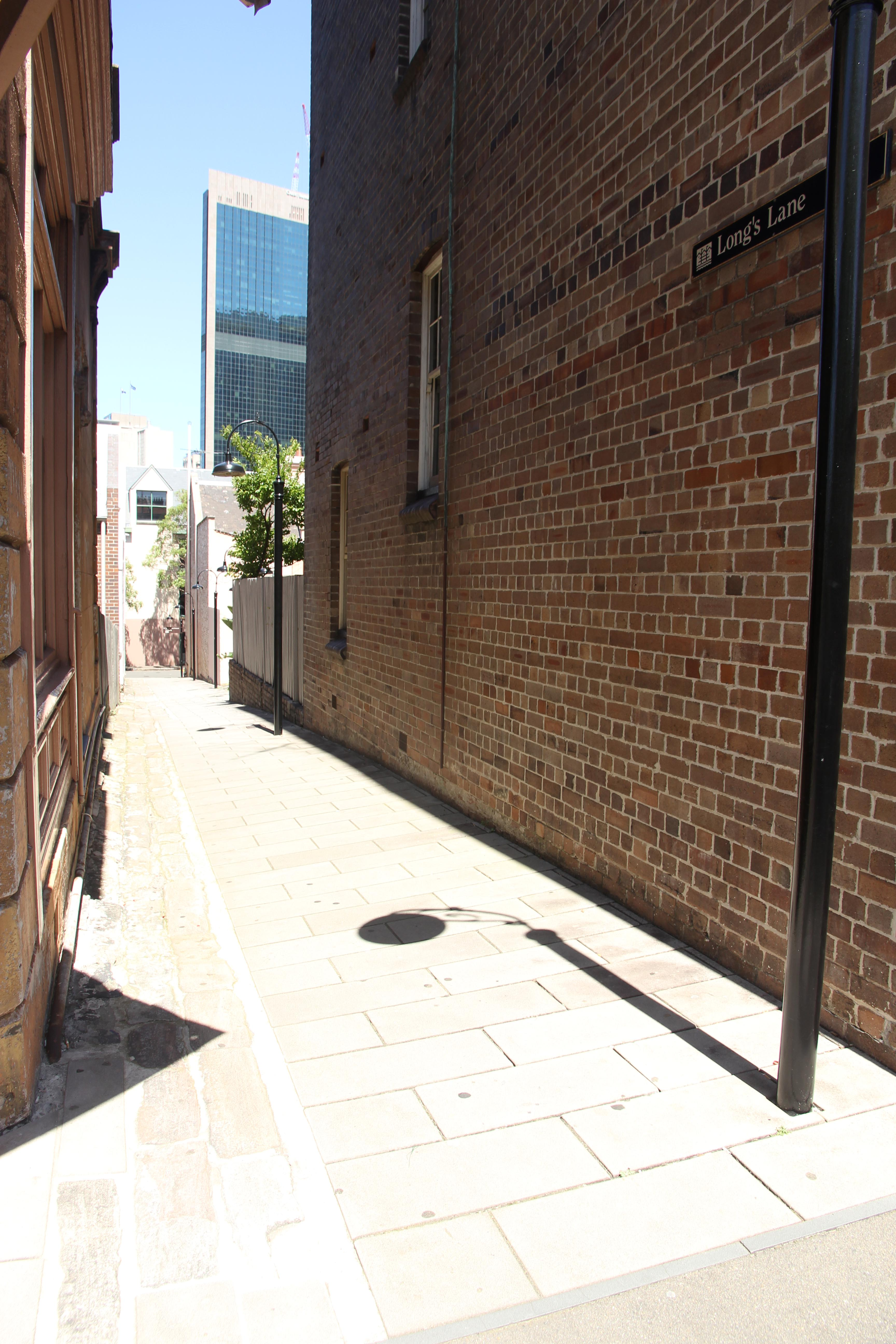
Long's Lane Precinct

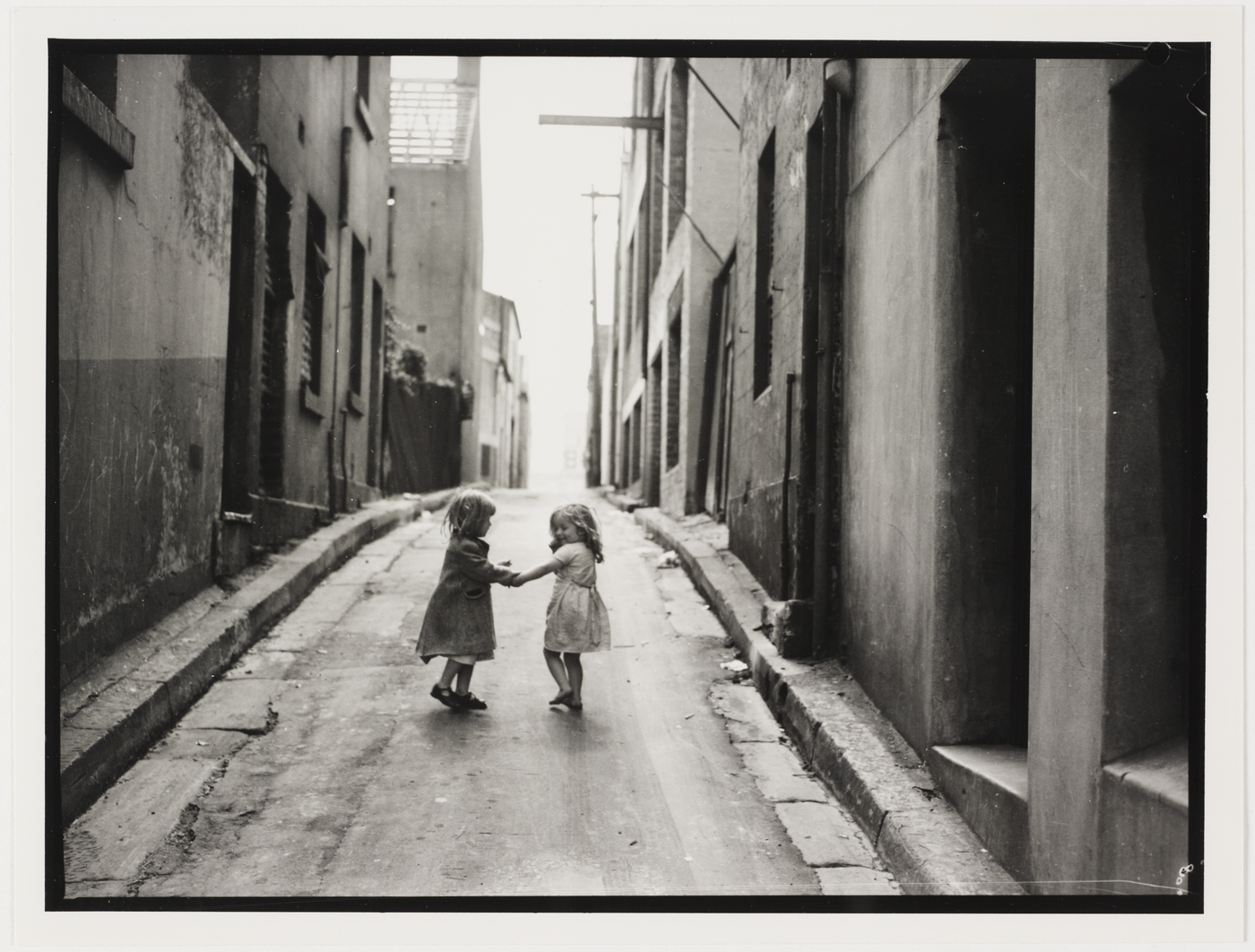
Slums of Surry Hills, 1949

== Suburbia ==
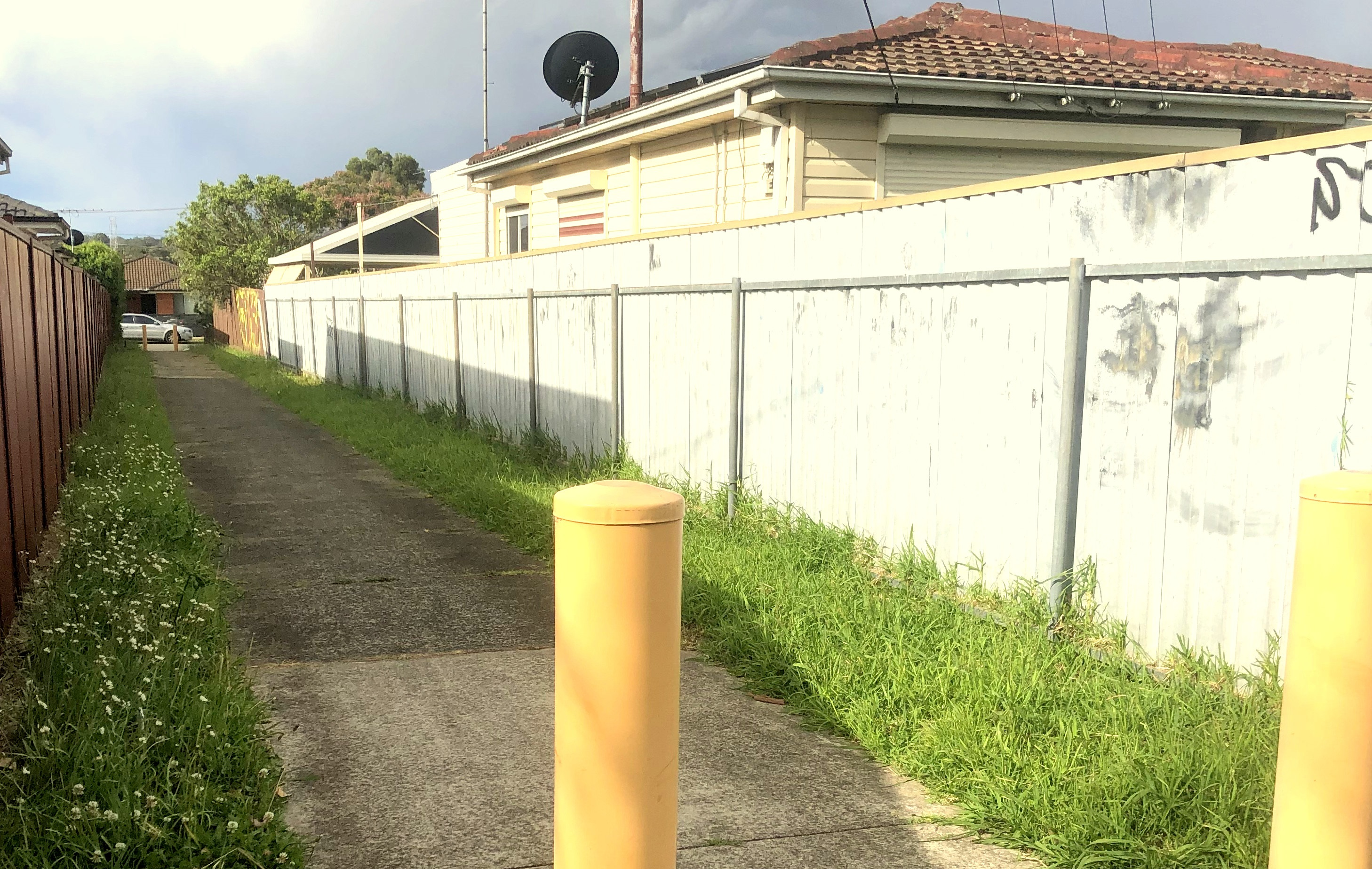
A fenced alleyway in Smithfield, Western Sydney

The suburban areas generally feature fenced or walled lanes that are "cut-through" residential lots, whereby granting pedestrians easy access to nearby facilities including shops, public transport, parks and other areas of interest situated on other roads. These passageways are more often present at the end of cul-de-sacs, where they would lead to a main road. They may feature a nature strip, though others may be completely paved. They are usually secured by bollards to prevent vehicle access, although cycling is permitted. They bear a resemblance to ginnels found in Northern England as they are a gap between houses.

In commercial areas of suburban Sydney, several back lanes exist to simultaneously offer carparking for proximate businesses and as well as pedestrian routes as a means of shortcut.

== See also ==
- Lanes and arcades of Melbourne
- Lanes of Perth, Western Australia
