= Long's Lane Precinct =

130 Cumberland Street, The Rocks
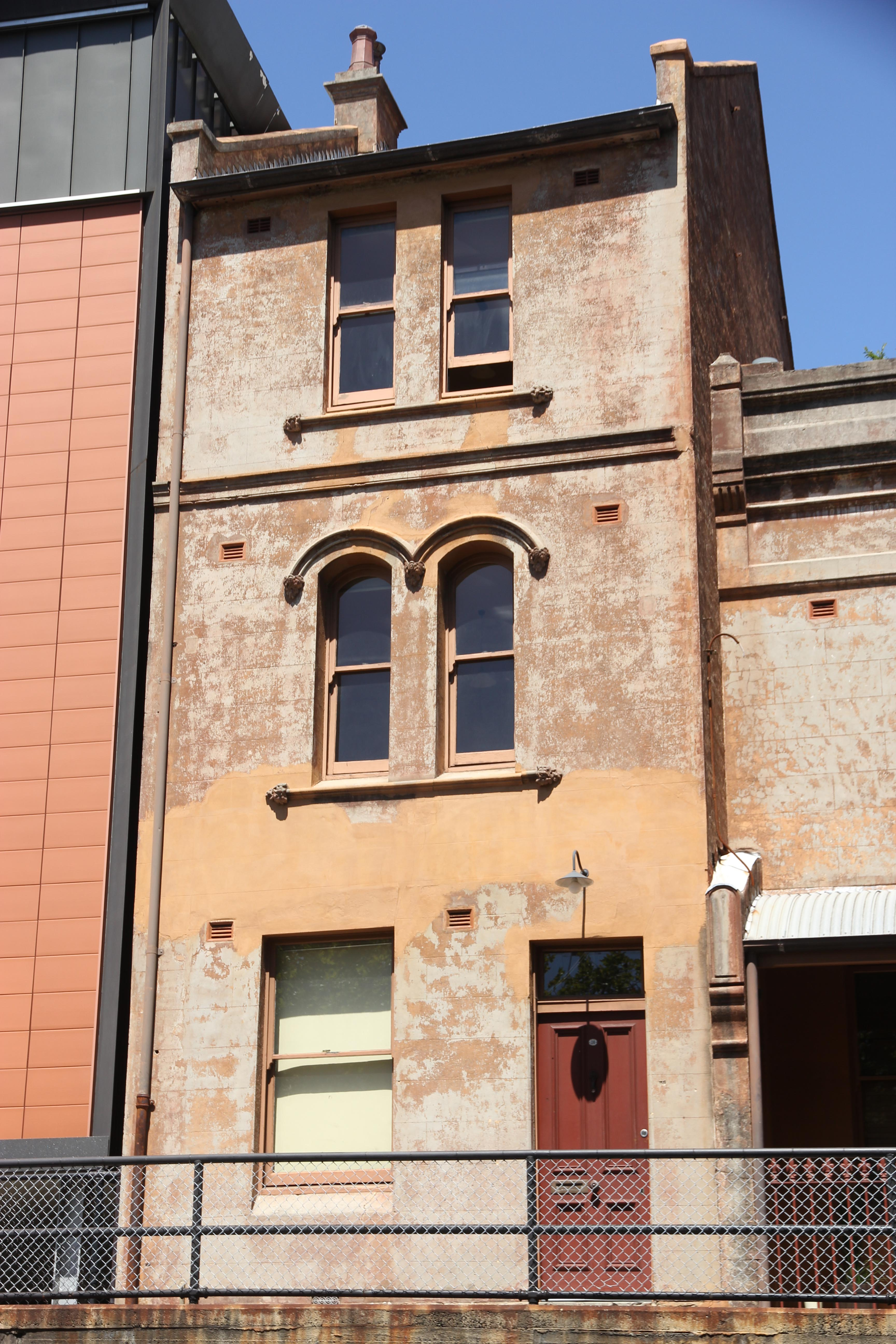
- 130 Cumberland Street, adjoining YHA Sydney on left, pictured in 2019.

- Location within Sydney Location within Australia
- 33.8604°S 151.2068°E
- Location: 130 Cumberland Street, The Rocks, City of Sydney, New South Wales, Australia

History
- Built: 1888–1888

Site notes
- Architectural style: Victorian Italianate
- Owner: NashCap

New South Wales Heritage Register
- Official name: Terrace; Longs Lane Terraces/Precinct
- Type: State heritage (built)
- Designated: 10 May 2002
- Reference no.: 1600
- Type: Terrace
- Category: Residential buildings (private)

132-134 Cumberland Street, The Rocks
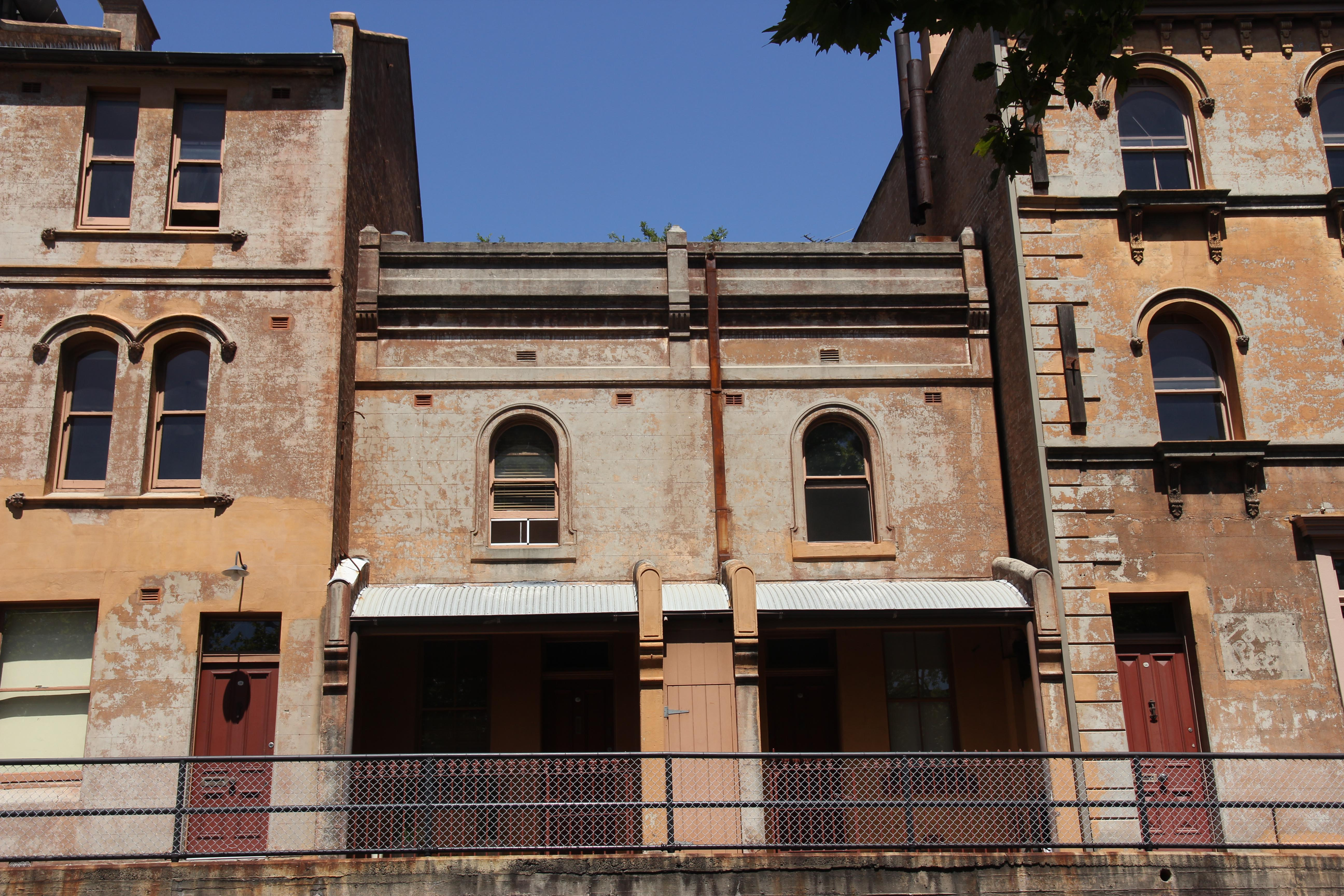
- 132-134 Cumberland Street; noticeably two storeys when the adjacent buildings are three storeys, pictured in 2019.

- Location within Sydney Location within Australia
- 33.8605°S 151.2067°E
- Location: 132–134 Cumberland Street, The Rocks, City of Sydney, New South Wales, Australia

History
- Built: 1891

Site notes
- Architectural style: Victorian Italianate
- Owner: NashCap

New South Wales Heritage Register
- Official name: Terraces; Longs Lane Terraces/Precinct
- Type: State heritage (built)
- Designated: 10 May 2002
- Reference no.: 1606
- Type: Terrace
- Category: Residential buildings (private)

136–138 Cumberland Street, The Rocks
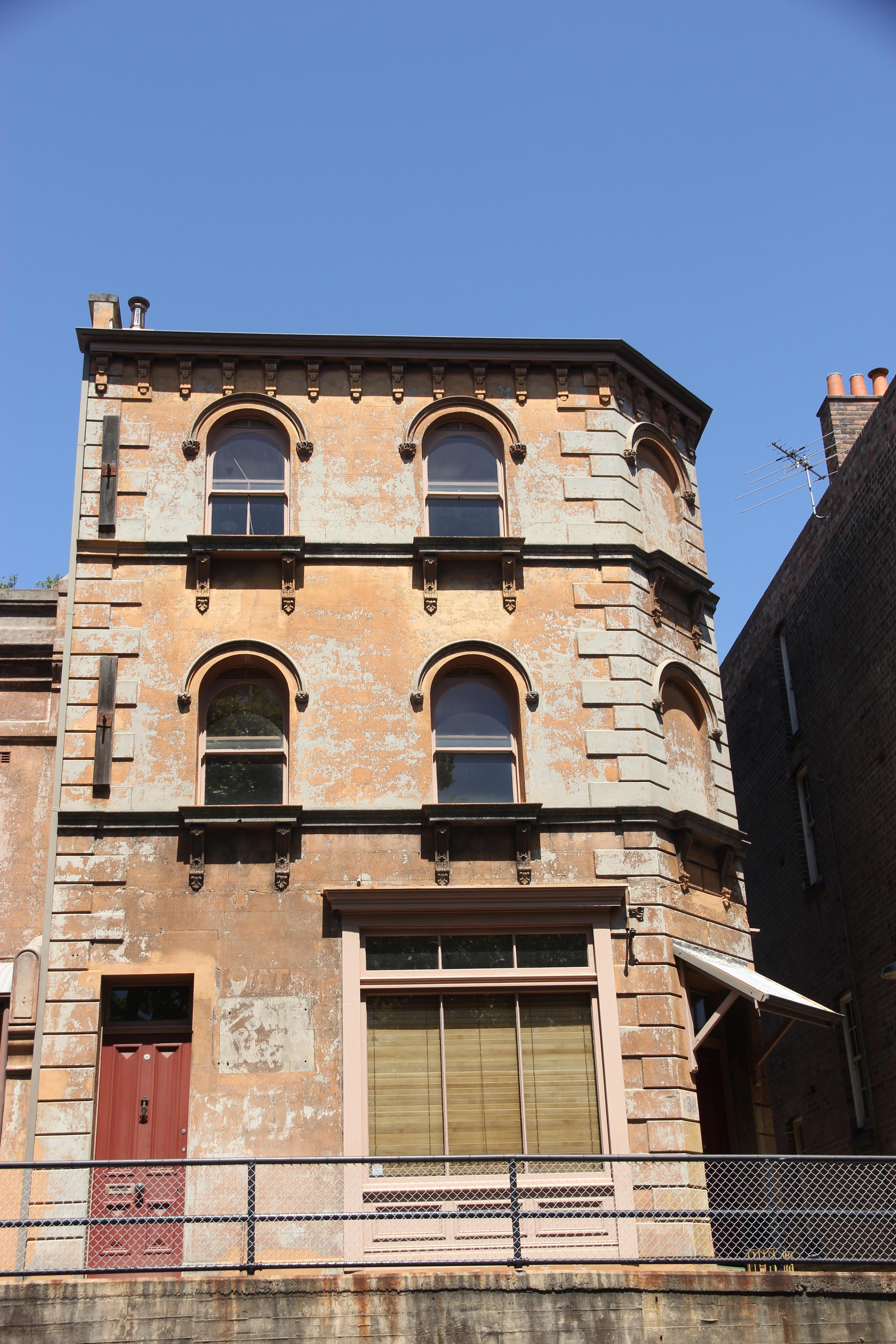
- 136–138 Cumberland Street, with Long's Lane at right, pictured in 2019.

- Location within Sydney Location within Australia
- 33.8605°S 151.2067°E
- Location: 136–138 Cumberland Street, The Rocks, City of Sydney, New South Wales, Australia

History
- Built: 1881–1882

Site notes
- Architectural style: Victorian Italianate
- Owner: NashCap

New South Wales Heritage Register
- Official name: Shops and Residences; Longs Lane Terraces/Precinct; Watson's Butchery
- Type: State heritage (built)
- Designated: 10 May 2002
- Reference no.: 1592
- Type: Terrace
- Category: Residential buildings (private)

140–142 Cumberland Street, The Rocks
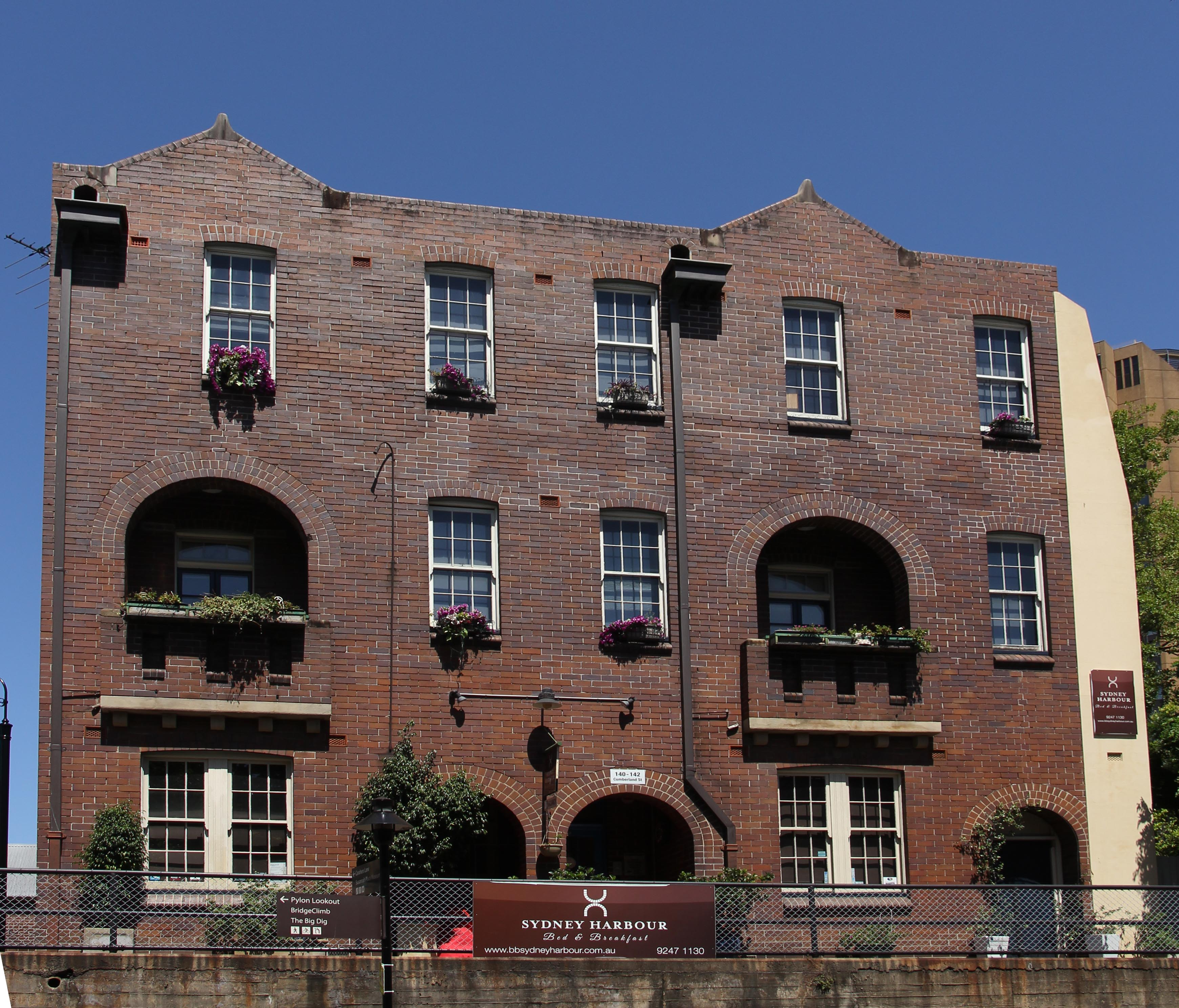
- 140–142 Cumberland Street, operating as Sydney Harbour Bed and Breakfast, pictured in 2019.

- Location within Sydney Location within Australia
- 33.8607°S 151.2066°E
- Location: 140–142 Cumberland Street, The Rocks, City of Sydney, New South Wales, Australia

History
- Built: 1914

Site notes
- Architect: W. H. Foggitt
- Architectural style: Edwardian
- Owner: NashCap

New South Wales Heritage Register
- Official name: Tenements, pair three-storey brick; Longs Lane Terraces/Precinct (Long's)
- Type: State heritage (built)
- Designated: 10 May 2002
- Reference no.: 1599
- Type: Terrace
- Category: Residential buildings (private)
- Builders: NSW Government Housing Board

The Long's Lane Precinct, also Longs Lane Precinct, comprise a series of heritage-listed terrace houses located at 130 Cumberland Street, 132–134 Cumberland Street, 136-138 Cumberland Street, and 140–142 Cumberland Street, in the inner-city Sydney suburb of The Rocks in the City of Sydney local government area of New South Wales, Australia. The terrace houses were built from 1888 to 1914, and they are also known as 130 Cumberland Street, 132–134 Cumberland Street, 136–138 Cumberland Street, Watson's Butchery, and 140–142 Cumberland Street. The properties are owned by NashCap, an Australian-based real estate private equity firm. The precinct and the terrace houses were added to the New South Wales State Heritage Register on 10 May 2002.

As of January 2019, 140–142 Cumberland Street operated as the Sydney Harbour Bed and Breakfast.

== History ==
=== 130 Cumberland Street ===
Occupation on this site dates from c. 1822 when George Cribb constructed a row of tenements along Cumberland Street to Longs Lane. These were demolished and replaced by a row of single-storey terraces around 1834. The first recorded grant was to Benjamin Ford in January 1839, and the site of No. 130 was then known as Allotment 10, Section 74, comprising 2.5 perches.

In 1845, the City Council noted the building on Allotment 10 was a two-room brick and stone house with a shingled roof in "middling repair". The "date of taking" is noted as 1833, which may imply a date of construction or earlier assessment by the Town Surveyor. The tenant in this year and until c. 1860 was the owner, Benjamin Ford, described as either a dealer or a cooper. Between 1845 and c. 1882, the demolition date, the building was described as a letted "shop" or "house and shop" of brick and/or stone construction. In 1861 Council noted that the "floor (was) under (the) footpath".

In 1888 the site's present building was erected as a speculative venture (owner not determined) and was first tenanted by William McGee, a tobacconist. Council described it in 1891 as a three-storey seven-room brick house with an iron roof. Magee resided in the house until 1895. In 1903 the land and building were resumed by the NSW Government under The Rocks Resumption Act, 1901.

The building at No. 130 remained tenanted as a residence until 1976. In the 1980s, the building was boarded up, with squatters intermittently occupying the building for the next ten years. Accordingly, a period of vandalism ensued during which much of the joinery and many fixtures were stolen. The timbers were subject to termite activity during this time. The original plan of the building has remained intact together with some of the authentic architectural detailing.

The Sydney Cove Authority undertook extensive work in the precinct in the mid-1990s. The work included the conservation and restoration of the buildings and rear yards of 103-117A Gloucester and 130-142 Cumberland Streets, the construction of four new sensitively sited and designed infill dwellings, and the conservation and reopening of the two historic laneways, namely, Long's and Caraher's Lanes. The work involved retaining as much of the significant fabric as possible from the various stages of the buildings' lives and was carried out in several stages from 1992 to 1997. The conservation work carried out on the Long's Lane precinct won the Royal Australian Institute of Architects 1998 Lloyd Rees Award for Outstanding Urban Design.

=== 132–134 Cumberland Street ===
In 1807, this site was shown on Meehan's Survey to contain what appears to be a well-defined building line. Artists' views of this section of The Rocks from c. 1800 – c. 1815 confirm a cluster of modest houses in the region. However, in 1822, the date of Harper's Plan, only one building outline is apparent in this section of Cumberland Street. Occupation on this site dates from c. 1822 when George Cribb constructed a row of tenements along Cumberland Street to Longs Lane. These were demolished and replaced by a row of single-storey terraces around 1834.

The first official land grant on the site of 132–134 Cumberland Street (referred to as Allotment 11 of Section 74, comprising 4.5 perches, in the Land Title records) was a Town Grant to Isaac Moore in January 1839. Moore had purchased the two adjoining dwelling houses on this allotment in 1833 from a John Jones. These dwellings were built before the first Council Rates were collected in 1845, at which time the houses were described as single-storey stone dwellings with two rooms apiece. These adjoining houses were demolished in 1880, and the land remained vacant until at least 1891. According to the Council Rates records, the existing conjoined two-storey terraces were constructed in the early 1890s; they were two-storey, five-room brick and cement dwellings with iron roofs.

132–134 Cumberland Street remained in continuous family ownership from 1833 until their resumption by the NSW Government in the early 1900s. The first owner, Isaac Moore, was the brother-in-law of Edward Brady (owner c. 1840–1867), and his niece was Mary Ann Smith, née Brady (owner c. 1877–1902). Moore sold to Edward Brady in 1840, according to Land Title records. On Brady's death in 1869, his will stipulated that Isaac Moore's sons, Edmund, William and Thomas Moore, were trustees and were required to provide for Mary Ann Smith during her life and her children after death.

Much of the land and many of the buildings in The Rocks, including the subject properties, were resumed by the NSW Government under The Darling Harbour Resumption Act in the early 1900s. The buildings at Nos. 132–134 Cumberland remained tenanted as residences until the 1970s. The buildings were boarded up in the 1980s, and for the next ten years, squatters intermittently occupied the buildings, and a period of vandalism ensued during which much of the joinery and many of the fixtures were stolen. The timbers were probably subject to termite activity.

The original internal layouts of the buildings have remained intact together with some of the original architectural detailing. The Sydney Cove Authority undertook extensive work in the precinct in the mid-1990s. The work included the conservation and restoration of the buildings and rear yards of 103–117A Gloucester and 130–142 Cumberland Streets, the construction of four new sensitively sited and designed infill dwellings, and the conservation and reopening of the two historic laneways, namely, Longs and Carahers Lanes. The work involved retaining as much of the significant fabric as possible from the various stages of the buildings' lives.

=== 136–138 Cumberland Street ===
In 1807, this site is shown on Meehan's Survey to contain what appears to be a well defined building line in Cumberland Street – its western boundary, and a lane to the south. Artists' views of this part of Sydney from c. 1800 – c. 1815 confirm a large number of small houses in the region. Occupation on this site is known from c. 1822 when George Cribb constructed a row of four tenements along Cumberland Street to Longs Lane. These were demolished and replaced by a row of single-storey terraces around 1834). The first official land grant on the site of Nos. 136-138 Cumberland Street (referred to as Allotment 12 of Section 74, comprising 4.5 perches, in the Land Title records), was a Town Grant to Thomas Garrard on 19 April 1839. There were originally two adjoining dwelling houses on this allotment (possibly the Cribb terraces referred to above). These two buildings/dwellings had been erected prior to the first Council Rates being collected in 1845, at which time they were described as single-storey stone houses with two rooms apiece. The two buildings at Nos. 136-138 Cumberland Street remained in continuous family ownership from 1833 until 1876, when they were sold to Richard Egan. He in turn sold to local resident and entrepreneur, John Johnson in c. 1881, who oversaw construction of the existing building on the site.

The two stone buildings at Nos. 136–138 Cumberland Street were "pulled down" by c. 1880 according to Council Rates records for this year. The existing building on the site was constructed by 1882; according to the rates records, it was a three-storey commercial building (a shop) with residential quarters above. The building was brick with an iron roof and had ten rooms.

John Johnson sold the new three-storey building to Kellas Watson, a draper, in c. 1882. Johnson had made a healthy profit on his investment; in 1880 Egan sold the land at Nos. 136–138 Cumberland Street to Johnson for £525. The following year, in August 1882, Johnson sold to Watson for £1800. Johnson's brief ownership of the site, during which time he built a substantial building, suggests that this was a speculative investment. Kellas Watson was an owner-occupier, and it is possible that he operated a drapery shop on the site. Watson sold the property to Henry Edward Castle, Sydney, commercial broker, in late c. 1884. Thereafter the shop was used as a shop, leased to Frederick Smith, butcher (c. 1885–87) and King Hing and Co. (1888–90). Peter. A. Nelson ran a boarding house in the building from c. 1892 to c. 1902.

Much of the land and many of the buildings in The Rocks, including the subject property, were resumed by the NSW Government under The Darling Harbour Resumption Act in the early 1900s. Nos. 136-138 Cumberland Street remained tenanted until the 1970s, probably as boarding house accommodation. The building was boarded up In the 1980s, and for the next 10 years, squatters intermittently occupied the building, and a period of vandalism ensued during which much of the joinery and many of the fixtures were stolen. It is likely that the timbers were subject to termite activity during this time.

The original internal layout of the building has remained intact together with some of the original architectural detailing. The Sydney Cove Authority undertook extensive work in the precinct in the mid-1990s. The work included the conservation and restoration of the buildings and rear yards of 103-117A Gloucester and 130–142 Cumberland Streets, the construction of four new sensitively sited and designed infill dwellings, and the conservation and reopening of the two historic laneways, namely, Longs and Carahers Lanes. The work involved the retention of as much of the significant fabric as possible from the various stages of the buildings' lives.

=== 140–142 Cumberland Street ===
Early plans and images, such as Watling's (attrib.) c. 1800 painting Sydney – Capital New South Wales and Meehan's 1807 Plan of Sydney Town show that present-day Cumberland Street between Essex and Argyle Streets was closely settled along a defined building alignment. These dwellings are likely to have been flimsy timber houses, built by the occupants (convicts and free settlers). The earliest reference to Long's Lane is made in Meehan's 1807 map, where the present day lines of Cumberland and Gloucester Streets are shown to have been formed with an interconnection along the alignment of Long's Lane. Development within the precinct occurred predominantly in the 1880s and in the first decades of the 20th century.

This property includes part of allotment 18 of section 74, along with 113-115 Gloucester Street, which was formally granted to William Long in 1839, legitimising his claim to ownership of the property. Previous to this, Long had assumed de facto ownership of the western section of allotment 18, fronting Cumberland St, upon the passing of Mary, his wife of two years, in 1829. Mary had owned the property since the death of her former husband, Richard Walker in 1825.

A former convict, Long arrived in Sydney aboard the Baring in 1815, but by 1829 was a successful wine and spirits merchant as well as being licensee of pubs in Millers Point and Lower George Street. In June 1830, Long advised the Colonial Secretary of his plans for the land adjacent Long's Lane: 'On this allotment I intend to have erected within six months from the present date (most of the foundations being now laid) 'ten handsome cottages the value of which when complete have seen estimates of £3000'. In the rate assessment book of 1845, this row is described as a group of eight brick single-storey tenements with shingle roofs, containing two rooms each.

By 1845, a two-storey, three room building with a shingled roof had been erected upon the site at the corner of Long's Lane and Cumberland Street, possibly on the site of two of Long's 1830 tenements. The building was variously described as a house, a shop, or a pub, having either seven or eight rooms. The pub was known as the Erin-go-Bragh ('Ireland for Ever') from 1871, with a name change to the Emerald between 1879 and 1882. Until 1853 the landlord for the property was James Wright, the trustee for Long's daughter Isabella. Wright was the proprietor of the Australian Brewery at the corner of Bathurst and George Streets, Sydney. In 1853 Long's daughter Isabella married James Martin, who subsequently became the registered owner of the property. Martin later served as Chief Justice of the NSW Supreme Court, was the Premier of New South Wales on three separate occasions, and is the person after whom Martin Place is named.

By 1882 the rate assessment books indicate that the pub had grown to contain between ten and fourteen rooms. A map dated to 1887 confirms that the building had undergone further alterations earlier in the previous decade. An extension to the pub was built at 142 Cumberland Street at this time, and mainly used as hairdresser's shop.

Following an outbreak of the Bubonic plague in Sydney and The Rocks the NSW Government, under The Rocks Resumption Act (1901), resumed the area, which was barricaded to prevent further spread of infection. Some buildings were demolished, and from 1912 the NSW Housing Board began to construct housing in the vacant blocks of land in The Rocks. The Housing Board, founded under the Housing Act 1912, was the first such agency in the state devoted to the construction of public housing. The Board acquired land upon which buildings were constructed to be leased to "persons qualified under the Act" for business or residential purposes. The Housing Board examined public housing initiatives in the UK and Europe, and incorporated those ideas in constructing tenement dwellings in The Rocks.

By 1907 the shop at 142 Cumberland Street and the adjoining building at No. 140 had been demolished. It appears that there was little development on the site over the next five years, but by 1912 the Board had moved to build worker's dwellings in Gloucester, Cumberland and Essex streets. In addition to housing, the Board also sought to ensure a mix of housing, corner shops, pubs and the like in the area. From 1912, the Housing Board built some 30 units in one development along Gloucester, Cumberland and Little Essex streets. In addition to housing, the Board also sought to ensure a mix of housing, corner shops, pubs and the like in the area. The new terraces, including 140–142 Cumberland Street, were built by J. H. Thompson of Bondi to the design of Board architect W. Foggitt. Among the first tenants of the new development at was Mrs Annie Johnson, who operated a "residential" [boarding house] at No. 142 between 1916 and 1931. Richard Boucher similarly ran a "residential" at No. 140, from 1925 to 1930. Of this large Housing Board development, only the northern units remain: the building at 117 Gloucester Street, and the subject building at 140-142 Cumberland Street.

The buildings demonstrate the typical Housing Board plan form, providing outdoor spaces in balconies and rear yards. Parts of the Gloucester / Essex / Cumberland Streets Housing Board development were demolished in the 1920s to make way for the approaches to the Sydney Harbour Bridge. The remainder of the development was demolished with the construction of the Cahill Expressway in the 1950s to make way for the new freeway. 140-142 Cumberland Street continued to be tenanted through the 1970s. The last house was vacated in the 1980s when the house was boarded up. Subsequently, squatters occupied the building. Many fixtures were stolen or demolished during this period, perhaps as a result of boom in house renovations elsewhere in the inner city.

Between 1994 and 1995, an extensive programme of conservation works was carried out on the building. The work comprised stabilisation, restoration of the front façade and roofs, cutting in damp proof courses, and construction of new floors. Joinery, plastering, and other surface finishes were reconstructed on the basis of surviving original fabric. The building is now operated as bed and breakfast accommodation. The Sydney Cove Authority also carried out conservation works to the buildings and rear yards in the remainder of the Long's Lane Precinct, including 113–115 Gloucester Street and 117–117a Gloucester Street.

== Description ==
=== 130 Cumberland Street ===
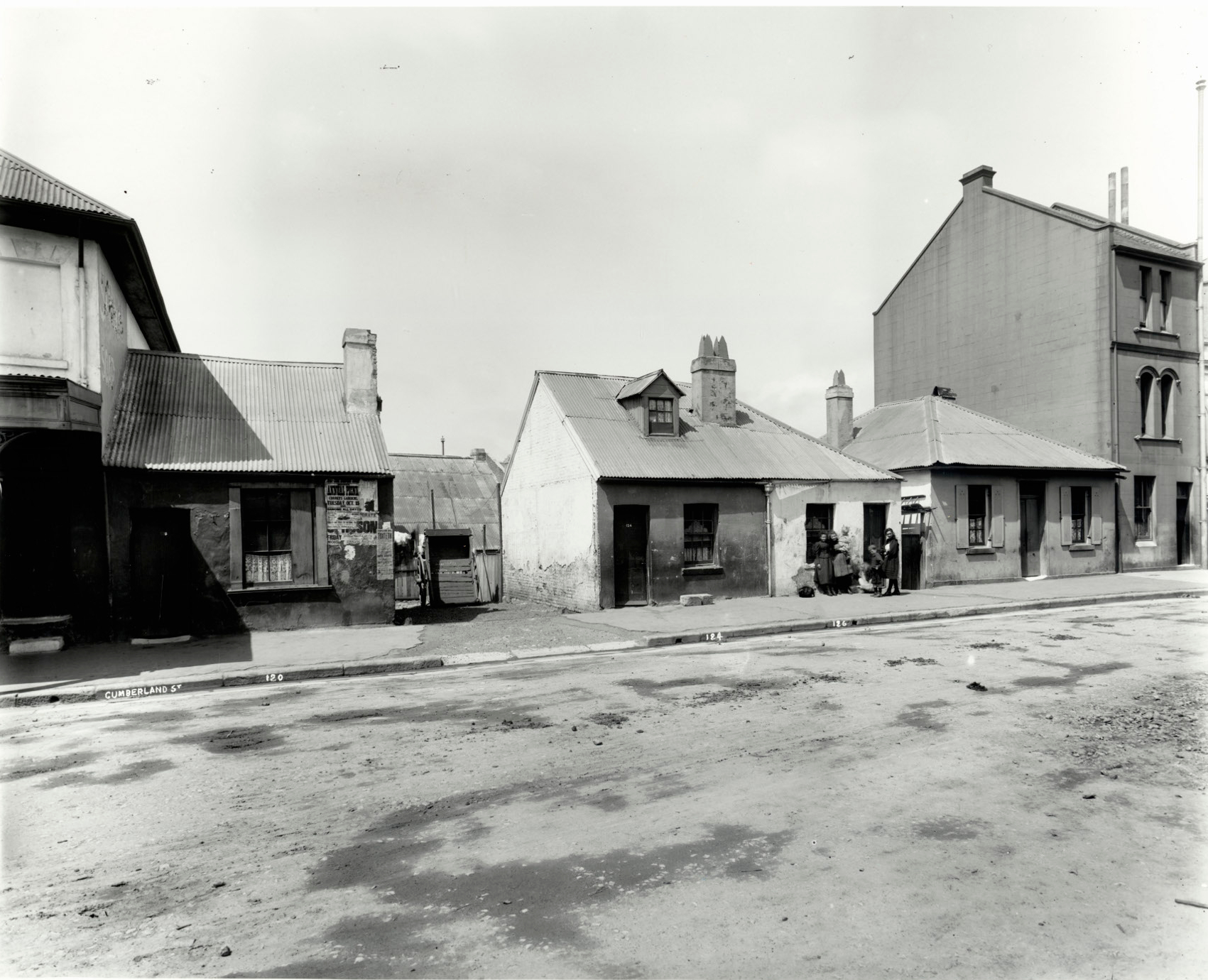
130 Cumberland Street, pictured at right, as the three-storey terrace house, in 1901. The single-storey houses to the left were demolished and now form part of the Cumberland Street Archaeological Site and YHA Sydney Harbour youth hostel.

130 Cumberland Street is a part of the 'Long's Lane Precinct'. Long's Lane is a cluster of nineteenth and early-twentieth houses, rear yards, and laneways between Gloucester and Cumberland Streets, The Rocks. 130 Cumberland Street is a three-storey building typical in scale and detail of terrace type buildings erected in the inner suburbs of Sydney during the 1880s. It is built of stuccoed brick with an iron roof, and has moulded string courses and the windows on the two upper levels are round headed. It relates in style to the two and three storey Italianate terraced buildings at Nos 132–134 and Nos 136–138 Cumberland Street.

Style: Late Victorian Italianate; Storeys: three; Roof cladding: Iron. Archaeological research potential is high.

==== Modifications and dates ====
- 1920s: The building appears to have been renovated.
- 1992–97: Conservation and restoration of the Long's Lane precinct.

=== 132–134 Cumberland Street ===
132–134 Cumberland Street is a part of the 'Long's Lane Precinct'. Long's Lane is a cluster of nineteenth and early-twentieth houses, rear yards, and laneways between Gloucester and Cumberland Streets, the Rocks. These two-storey residential terraces are typical of the 1880s building style. The two five room terraces are built of stuccoed brick with an iron roofs, and have moulded string courses and arched windows on the upper level. They relate in style to the three-storey Italianate terraced buildings on either side at Nos. 130 and Nos 136–138 Cumberland Street. An unusual feature of this infill development is the reduced scale of the building and set back relative to these two adjoining properties. The set back has allowed the incorporation of a front porch. The incorporation of a central passageway between the two to the rear of the buildings is a relatively rare feature on the terraces of Sydney.

Style: Late Victorian Italianate terrace; Storeys: two; Facade: Rendered brick; Roof cladding: Iron. Archaeological potential is high.

==== Modifications and dates ====
- 1992–97: Conservation and restoration of the Long's Lane precinct.

=== 136–138 Cumberland Street ===
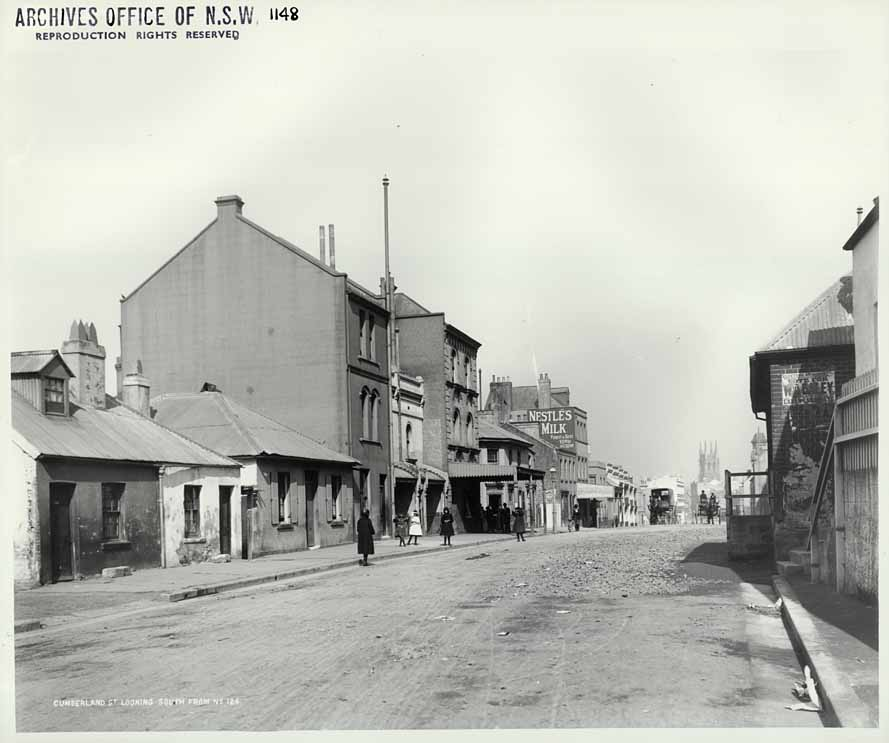
136–138 Cumberland Street, the three-storey terrace at left with an awning, pictured in 1901.

136–138 Cumberland Street is a part of the 'Long's Lane Precinct'. Long's Lane is a cluster of nineteenth and early-twentieth houses, rear yards, and laneways between Gloucester and Cumberland Streets, the Rocks. The three-storey corner building is of stuccoed brick with an iron roof. It has moulded string courses and arched windows on the upper two storeys, a moulded coping with decorative corbels and stucco quoins. While this three-storey building is typical of 1880s development in detail and planning, it was intended as a shop and boarding house, which may account for its relatively elaborate detailing. While the original planning of the building remains intact, much of the original architectural detailing, apart from the windows, has been removed.

Style: Late Victorian Italianate; Storeys: three; Roof cladding: iron. Archaeological potential: high.

==== Modifications and dates ====
- 1992–97: Conservation and restoration of the Long's Lane precinct.

=== 140–142 Cumberland Street ===
140–142 Cumberland Street is a part of the 'Long's Lane Precinct'. Long's Lane is a cluster of nineteenth and early-twentieth houses, rear yards, and laneways between Gloucester and Cumberland Streets, the Rocks. These buildings are part of the same development as 117-117A Gloucester Street, relating to the NSW Government Housing Board redevelopment of the block bounded by Little Essex (now demolished), Cumberland and Gloucester Streets.

Style: Edwardian; Storeys: two.

==== Condition ====
As at 21 November 2002, any further ground disturbance on this site should be closely monitored by an archaeologist and in conjunction with a formal research design and knowledge of the results and research design of the 1994 Cumberland/Gloucester Street excavation. Possible archaeological resource.

==== Modifications and dates ====
- 1992–97: Conservation and restoration of the Long's Lane precinct.

== Heritage listing ==
=== 130 Cumberland Street ===
As at 27 October 2008, No. 130 Cumberland Street and its site are of State heritage significance for their historical and scientific cultural values. The site and building are also of State heritage significance for their contribution to the Longs Lane Precinct and The Rocks area as a whole. The relationship between No. 130 Cumberland Street and its neighbours in the Longs Lane Precinct is clear and still within the historic street pattern even though many of its nineteenth century neighbours did not survive the Government twentieth century resumption and improvements.

Within the state significant Rocks and Millers Point areas, No. 130 Cumberland Street site is an important survivor from the late nineteenth century which still retains its tenanted residential use and still clearly demonstrates its historic planning particularly with its service areas. No. 130 Cumberland Street exhibits all the key characteristics of a late nineteenth century modest inner city residential terrace. Within the building, the original hierarchy is still clearly expressed with the ground floor formal rooms, first and second floor bedrooms and rear service rooms and the building retains a critical mass of its major fabric and fittings such as its structure, timber stair walls, decorative joinery and fireplace. The fittings and decoration, which date from the 1990s reconstruction work, and the deliberate retention of the building's external weathered patina, heighten the experience of the building's age.

The positioning of the terrace on an abrupt sandstone and beton brut plinth formed out the lowering of Cumberland Street has raised the building and its wide bare north wall up as a local landmark in Cumberland Street.

Terrace was listed on the New South Wales State Heritage Register on 10 May 2002 having satisfied the following criteria.

The place is important in demonstrating the course, or pattern, of cultural or natural history in New South Wales.

The Longs Lane Precinct is historically significant as it is indicative of mid nineteenth to early-twentieth century residential development of The Rocks, retaining strong associational and geographic links with adjacent community uses such as shops (Susannah Place), and hotels (The Australian Hotel and others). No. 130 Cumberland Street is a good and mostly intact representative example of a late nineteenth century modest inner city tenanted residential terrace and makes an important contribution to the understanding of the historical development of The Rocks and Millers Point particularly of the areas' resident use. The area, which is now identified with No. 130, is slightly longer than the original 1830s lot, but its narrowness remains as evidence of the density and character of the early nineteenth century subdivisions in The Rocks. The site commenced as a speculative venture in its initial form as an 1840s single-storey two-room house which was replaced by the current 1880s terrace still confined by the 1830s narrow lot. The size of the original lot is testament to how lower quality housing came about in the nineteenth century, mostly built by speculative developers which was let to tenants who were attracted to live in the area because of the proximity to employment within the wharves and related industries.

The work undertaken by the then Sydney Cove Authority (subsequently Sydney Harbour Foreshore Authority) to sensitively conserve and adapt the precinct and the building and rear yards and retain as much of the significant fabric as possible from the various stages of the buildings' lives added a new contemporary layer reflecting the conservation ethos at the time.

The place has a strong or special association with a person, or group of persons, of importance of cultural or natural history of New South Wales's history.

Three families have associations with the Longs Lane precinct as owners/developers: Long, Jobbins and Caraher, each provides an interesting contrast in their approach to the way the different allotments were developed. No. 130 Cumberland Street itself does not have a strong or special association with significant people who are important in NSW or The Rocks' cultural or natural history.

The place is important in demonstrating aesthetic characteristics and/or a high degree of creative or technical achievement in New South Wales.

The Longs Lane Precinct contributes significantly to the townscape of The Rocks. This significance rests on the ensemble of buildings dating from the mid-nineteenth to early-twentieth centuries, together with associated laneways and rear yards. In Cumberland Street, the 1880s buildings by their geographic isolation present a varied and characterful collection enhanced by the conjunction with Longs Lane which is complemented by the Edwardian style building at 140-142 Cumberland Street. No. 130 Cumberland Street is a good representative example of a modest late nineteenth century terrace with some Italianate pretensions but the residence does not in itself demonstrate a high degree of aesthetic, creative or technical achievement. The building demonstrates mostly modest standards of construction in materials and workmanship. The fittings and decoration, which date from the 1990s reconstruction work, and the deliberate retention of the building's external weathered patina, heighten the experience of the building's age. The positioning of the terrace on an abrupt sandstone plinth formed out the lowering of Cumberland Street almost accidentally raised the building and its wide bare north wall up as a local landmark although the building's north wall has been a local feature since the construction of the terrace. The terrace's former northern neighbour was a single-storey house.

The place has a strong or special association with a particular community or cultural group in New South Wales for social, cultural or spiritual reasons.

Although The Rocks as a whole is highly valued throughout Australia as a precinct with strong connections to important Australian historical themes, No. 130 Cumberland Street itself does not have strong or special association with a particular community or cultural group in NSW or The Rocks area for social, cultural or spiritual reasons.

The place has potential to yield information that will contribute to an understanding of the cultural or natural history of New South Wales.

The Longs Lane Precinct is of prime archaeological significance with its continued European occupation from at least the first quarter of the nineteenth century in a relatively undisturbed state. The Longs Lane Precinct is of educational value to specialists and the general public with its ensemble of nineteenth buildings, laneways and rear yards, and its significance is enhanced by the tangible relationship of the buildings and laneways to the documentary and oral historical information. The archaeological potential of the site of No. 130 Cumberland Street is high and relates to early development of The Rocks as well as late nineteenth and early twentieth century development. No. 130's rear yard corresponds with parts of the former yards of 9–11 Carahers Lane. The significance of this evidence is high. Any subfloor archaeological deposits are a significant resource.

The place possesses uncommon, rare or endangered aspects of the cultural or natural history of New South Wales.

Within The Rocks, No. 130 Cumberland Street site is an important survivor from the late nineteenth century which still retains its residential use and demonstrates its historic planning particularly its service areas. The Longs Lane Precinct dating from the mid-nineteenth to early twentieth centuries which together with its open areas, yards, lanes and footpaths dating from the early nineteenth century is rare in the Sydney Region. Importantly, the relationship between No. 130 Cumberland Street and its neighbours in the Longs Lane Precinct is still clear and unobstructed and still within the historic street pattern.

The place is important in demonstrating the principal characteristics of a class of cultural or natural places/environments in New South Wales.

No. 130 Cumberland Street is a good intact representative example of a late nineteenth century modest inner city residential terrace. However, the value of No. 130 Cumberland Street as part of the Longs Lane precinct is considered to be rare in New South Wales and are therefore discussed under Criterion F.

=== 132–134 Cumberland Street ===
As at 11 March 2009, the sites and buildings at Nos. 132–134 Cumberland Street are of State heritage significance for their historical and scientific cultural values. The sites and buildings are also of State heritage significance for their contribution to the Longs Lane Precinct and The Rocks area as a whole. The relationship between Nos. 132–134 Cumberland Street and their neighbours in the Longs Lane Precinct is clear and still within historic street pattern even though many of its nineteenth century neighbours did not survive the twentieth century Government resumptions and improvements.

Within the State significant Rocks and Millers Point areas, Nos. 132–134 Cumberland Street are important survivors from the late nineteenth century which still retain their tenanted residential use and still clearly demonstrate their historic planning particularly with their service areas. Nos. 132–134 Cumberland Street exhibit all the key characteristics of a late nineteenth century pair of modest inner city residential terrace houses. Within the buildings, the original hierarchy is still clearly expressed with the ground floor living areas, first floor bedrooms and rear service rooms. The buildings retain a critical mass of their major fabric and fittings such as their structure, timber stair, walls, decorative joinery and fireplace. The fittings and decoration, which date from the 1990s reconstruction work, and the deliberate retention of the buildings' external weathered patina, heighten the experience of the buildings' age. The position of the buildings on an abrupt sandstone and beton brut plinth formed out the lowering of Cumberland Street, has raised the building and its wide bare north wall up as a local landmark in Cumberland Street.

The archaeological potential of the site of Nos. 132–134 Cumberland Street is high and relates to early development of The Rocks as well as late nineteenth and early twentieth century development. Any subfloor archaeological deposits are a significant resource.

Terraces was listed on the New South Wales State Heritage Register on 10 May 2002 having satisfied the following criteria.

The place is important in demonstrating the course, or pattern, of cultural or natural history in New South Wales.

The Longs Lane Precinct is historically significant as it is indicative of mid nineteenth to early-twentieth century residential development of The Rocks, retaining strong associational and geographic links with adjacent community uses such as shops (Susannah Place) and hotels (The Australian Hotel and others).

Nos. 132–134 Cumberland Street are good and mostly intact representative examples of late nineteenth century modest inner city tenanted residential terraces and make an important contribution to the understanding of the historical development of The Rocks and Millers Point, particularly of the areas' residents. The area now identified with Nos. 130–138 Cumberland Street remains as evidence of the density and character of the early nineteenth century subdivisions in The Rocks. The site commenced as a speculative venture in its initial form as a row of tenements in 1822, replaced in 1834. These single-storey terraces were then replaced by the current buildings: Nos. 136–138 Cumberland Street in c. 1881–82, No. 130 in c. 1888, and Nos. 132–134 in 1891. The size of the original lot is testament to how lower quality housing came about in the nineteenth century, mostly built by speculative developers which was let to tenants who were attracted to live in the area because of the proximity to employment within the wharves and related industries.

The work undertaken by the then Sydney Cove Authority to sensitively conserve and adapt the precinct and the building and rear yards and retain as much of the significant fabric as possible from the various stages of the buildings' lives adds a new layer of historical value reflecting the conservation ethos of the late twentieth century, particularly as it applies to NSW Government management of The Rocks. Nos. 132-134 Cumberland Street meet this criterion on a State level.

The place has a strong or special association with a person, or group of persons, of importance of cultural or natural history of New South Wales's history.

Three families have associations with the Longs Lane precinct as owners/developers: Long, Jobbins and Caraher, each provides an interesting contrast in their approach to the way the different allotments were developed. Nos. 132–134 Cumberland Street have associations with the Moore – Brady – Smith related families from 1833 until resumed by the Government in 1901. This family is reasonably typical of property owning families in The Rocks who also went to be land owners elsewhere in Sydney, in this case Mosman. These associations are not at the level to be described as strong or special association with significant people who are important in NSW cultural or natural history. Although the Longs Lane precinct group meets this criterion on a Local level, Nos. 132–134 Cumberland Street do not meet this criterion.

The place is important in demonstrating aesthetic characteristics and/or a high degree of creative or technical achievement in New South Wales.

The Longs Lane Precinct contributes significantly to the townscape of The Rocks. This significance rests on the ensemble of buildings dating from the mid-nineteenth to early-twentieth centuries, together with associated laneways and rear yards. In Cumberland Street, the 1880s buildings by their geographic isolation present a varied and characterful collection enhanced by the conjunction with Longs Lane, which is complemented by the Edwardian building at 140–142 Cumberland Street.

Nos. 132–134 Cumberland Street are good representative examples of a modest late nineteenth century pair of terrace houses with some Italianate pretensions but the residences do not in themselves demonstrate a high degree of aesthetic, creative or technical achievement. The buildings demonstrate mostly modest standards of construction in materials and workmanship. The fittings and decoration, which partly date from the 1990s reconstruction work, and the deliberate retention of the buildings' external weathered patina, heighten the experience of the buildings' age. The positioning of the Longs Lane Precinct terraces on an abrupt sandstone plinth formed out of the lowering of Cumberland Street, has almost accidentally raised the buildings as local landmarks. Nos. 132-134 Cumberland Street meets this criterion at a State level.

The place has a strong or special association with a particular community or cultural group in New South Wales for social, cultural or spiritual reasons.

Although The Rocks as a whole is highly valued throughout Australia as a precinct with strong connections to important Australian historical themes, Nos. 132–134 Cumberland Street do not have strong or special association with a particular community or cultural group in NSW or The Rocks area for social, cultural or spiritual reasons.

The place has potential to yield information that will contribute to an understanding of the cultural or natural history of New South Wales.

The Longs Lane Precinct is of prime archaeological significance with its continued European occupation from at least the first quarter of the nineteenth century in a relatively undisturbed state. The Longs Lane Precinct is of educational value to specialists and the general public with its ensemble of nineteenth buildings, laneways and rear yards, and its significance is enhanced by the tangible relationship of the buildings and laneways to the documentary and oral historical information. The archaeological potential of the site of Nos. 132-134 Cumberland Street is high and relates to early development of The Rocks as well as late nineteenth and early twentieth century development. Any subfloor archaeological deposits are a significant resource. Nos. 132-134 Cumberland Street meet this criterion on a State level.

The place possesses uncommon, rare or endangered aspects of the cultural or natural history of New South Wales.

Within The Rocks, Nos. 132–134 Cumberland Street site are important survivors from the late nineteenth century, which still retain their residential use and demonstrate their historic internal spatial relationships, particularly its rear service areas. The terraces also retain an unusual amount of joinery and other fittings correct to the period, although much was reconstructed in the 1990s. The Longs Lane Precinct dating from the mid-nineteenth to early twentieth centuries which together with its open areas, yards, lanes and footpaths dating from the early nineteenth century is rare in the Sydney Region. Importantly, the relationships between Nos. 132–134 Cumberland Street and its neighbours in the Longs Lane Precinct is still clear and unobstructed and still within the historic street pattern. Nos. 132-134 Cumberland Street meets this criterion on a Local level.

The place is important in demonstrating the principal characteristics of a class of cultural or natural places/environments in New South Wales.

Nos. 132–134 Cumberland Street are good intact representative examples of a late nineteenth century modest inner city residential terraces. However, the value of Nos. 132–134 Cumberland Street as part of the Longs Lane precinct are considered to be rare in New South Wales, and are therefore discussed under Criterion F. Nos. 132–134 Cumberland Street meets this criterion on a local level.

=== 136–138 Cumberland Street ===
As at 31 March 2011, No. 136–138 Cumberland Street and its site are of State heritage significance for their historical and scientific cultural values which contribute to the Longs Lane Precinct and The Rocks area as a whole. The relationship between No. 136–138 Cumberland Street and its neighbours in the Longs Lane Precinct is clear and still within the historic street pattern even though many of its nineteenth century neighbours did not survive the Government twentieth century resumption and improvements.

Within the state significant Rocks and Millers Point areas, No. 136–138 Cumberland Street is an important survivor from the late nineteenth century which still clearly demonstrates its historic planning particularly with the shop area addressing the corner and the rear service area. No. 136-138 Cumberland Street exhibits all the key characteristics of a late nineteenth century modest inner city commercial / residential corner building. Within the building the original hierarchy is still clearly expressed with the ground floor commercial rooms, first floor living areas, second floor bedrooms and rear service rooms. The building retains a critical mass of major fabric and fittings such as its structure, timber stair, walls and decorative joinery. The fittings and decoration, which date from the 1990s reconstruction work, and the deliberate retention of the building's external weathered patina, heighten the experience of the building's age. The position of the building on the corner of Longs Lane and on an abrupt sandstone and beton brut plinth gives it some landmark value in Cumberland Street.

Shops and Residences was listed on the New South Wales State Heritage Register on 10 May 2002 having satisfied the following criteria.

The place is important in demonstrating the course, or pattern, of cultural or natural history in New South Wales.

The Longs Lane Precinct is historically significant as it is indicative of mid nineteenth to early-twentieth century residential development of The Rocks, retaining strong associational and geographic links with other community uses such as shops (Susannah Place) and hotels (The Australian and others). Nos. 136–138 Cumberland Street is a good and mostly intact representative example of late nineteenth century inner city commercial / residential corner building which makes an important contribution to the understanding of the historical development of The Rocks and Millers Point. The area now identified with Nos. 136–138 Cumberland Street remains as evidence of the density and character of the early nineteenth century subdivisions in The Rocks. The site commenced as a speculative venture in its initial form as two single-storey two-roomed houses, which was then replaced by the current 1880s three-storey commercial /residential building. The size of the original lot is testament to how lower quality housing came about in the nineteenth century, mostly built by speculative developers which was let to tenants who were attracted to live in the area because of the proximity to employment within the wharves and related industries. The work undertaken by the then Sydney Cove Authority (now the Sydney Harbour Foreshore Authority) to sensitively conserve and adapt the precinct and the building and rear yards and retain as much of the significant fabric as possible from the various stages of the buildings' lives added a new contemporary layer reflecting the conservation ethos at the time. Nos. 136–138 Cumberland Street meets this criterion at a State level.

The place has a strong or special association with a person, or group of persons, of importance of cultural or natural history of New South Wales's history.

Three families have associations with the Longs Lane precinct as owners/developers: Long, Jobbins and Caraher, each provides an interesting contrast in their approach to the way the different allotments were developed. Nos. 136–138 Cumberland Street does not have a strong or special association with significant people who are important in NSW or The Rocks' cultural or natural history. Although the Longs Lane precinct group meets this criterion on a Local level, Nos. 136-138 Cumberland Street does not meet this criterion.

The place is important in demonstrating aesthetic characteristics and/or a high degree of creative or technical achievement in New South Wales.

The Long's Lane Precinct contributes significantly, in particular, to the townscape of The Rocks, and, in general, Sydney. This significance rests on the ensemble of buildings dating from the mid-nineteenth to early-twentieth centuries, together with associated laneways and rear yards. In Cumberland Street the 1880s buildings by their geographic isolation present a varied and characterful collection enhanced by the conjunction with Long's Lane which is complemented by the Edwardian style building at 140–142 Cumberland Street. The design of Nos. 136–138 Cumberland Street consciously relates to the junction between Long's Lane and Cumberland Street, demarcating the public passageway. The design of the building is of high architectural significance.

The place has a strong or special association with a particular community or cultural group in New South Wales for social, cultural or spiritual reasons.

The Longs Lane Precinct contributes significantly to the townscape of The Rocks. This significance rests on the ensemble of buildings dating from the mid-nineteenth to early-twentieth centuries, together with associated laneways and rear yards. In Cumberland Street, the 1880s buildings by their geographic isolation present a varied and characterful collection enhanced by the conjunction with Longs Lane, which is complemented by the Edwardian style building at 140–142 Cumberland Street. No. 136–138 Cumberland Street is a good representative example of a late nineteenth century commercial /residential building with some Italianate pretensions but in itself does not demonstrate a high degree of aesthetic, creative or technical achievement. The building demonstrates mostly modest standards of construction in materials and workmanship. The fittings and decoration, which date from the 1990s reconstruction work, and the deliberate retention of the building's external weathered patina, heighten the experience of the building's age. The positioning of the building at the corner of Longs Lane and on an abrupt sandstone plinth formed out the lowering of Cumberland Street gives it some landmark value. Nos. 136–138 Cumberland Street meets this criterion at a State level.

The place has potential to yield information that will contribute to an understanding of the cultural or natural history of New South Wales.

The Longs Lane Precinct is of prime archaeological significance with its continued European occupation from at least the first quarter of the nineteenth century in a relatively undisturbed state. The Longs Lane Precinct is of educational value to specialists and the general public with its ensemble of nineteenth buildings, laneways and rear yards, and its significance is enhanced by the tangible relationship of the buildings and laneways to the documentary and oral historical information. The archaeological potential of the site of No. 136–138 Cumberland Street is high and relates to early development of The Rocks as well as late nineteenth and early twentieth century development. Any subfloor archaeological deposits are a significant resource. Nos. 136–138 Cumberland Street meets this criterion at a State level.

The place possesses uncommon, rare or endangered aspects of the cultural or natural history of New South Wales.

Within The Rocks, Nos. 136–138 Cumberland Street is an important survivor from the late nineteenth century, which demonstrates its historic planning as a commercial / residential building including rear service areas. The Longs Lane Precinct dating from the mid-nineteenth to early twentieth centuries which together with its open areas, yards, lanes and footpaths dating from the early nineteenth century is rare in the Sydney Region. Importantly, the relationships between Nos. 136–138 Cumberland Street and its neighbours in the Longs Lane Precinct is still clear and unobstructed and still within the historic street pattern. Nos. 136–138 Cumberland Street meets this criterion at a local level.

The place is important in demonstrating the principal characteristics of a class of cultural or natural places/environments in New South Wales.

No. 136–138 Cumberland Street is a good intact representative example of a late nineteenth century inner city residential/commercial building. However, the value of No. 136–138 Cumberland Street, as part of the Longs Lane precinct, is considered to be rare in New South Wales, and are therefore discussed under Criterion F. Nos. 136–138 Cumberland Street meets this criterion at a local level.

=== 140–142 Cumberland Street ===
As at 11 March 2009, this pair of tenements and site are of State heritage significance for their historical and scientific cultural values. The site and building are also of State heritage significance for their contribution to The Rocks area which is of State Heritage significance in its own right.

The Longs Lane precinct is primarily significant as a unique ensemble of nineteenth century residential buildings, laneways and rear yards in The Rocks, and because it includes the terrace, 103–111 Gloucester Street, which is a very rare extant example in Sydney of an early Victorian Greek Revival style terrace of houses created as total composition.

Longs Lane precinct is also significant because: It is indicative of the nineteenth and early-twentieth century residential character of The Rocks, retaining strong associational and geographic links with community services such as shops, and churches. It retains rare examples of early-nineteenth century public laneways in their original scale and orientation. It is a unique ensemble in The Rocks of tenanted residential buildings of varying nineteenth and early twentieth century architectural periods including the Early Victorian, Victorian, and Edwardian. It possesses a unique archaeological potential as a discrete cluster of buildings, laneways, and rear yards of various buildings, relatively undisturbed since 1915, dating from the earliest period of occupation in Sydney.

Numbers 117–119 Gloucester and 140–142 Cumberland Streets are rare examples of the early-twentieth-century government-built worker's housing project initiated by the Housing Board Act 1912. Numbers 140-142 are the remaining pair of a larger contemporary group, now demolished, that fronted Cumberland, Little Essex and Gloucester Streets.

Longs Lane is a rare extant public right of way known to have existed from the first decade of the nineteenth century. Carahers Lane is a rare documented site where the existence of slum housing from the-mid to late-nineteenth century can be shown to be associated with the remaining physical fabric, and historical documentation about the landlords/owners.

140–142 Cumberland Street is of historical, aesthetic, and scientific significance to the people of New South Wales for its contribution to the Longs Lane precinct which is significant in demonstrating the evolution of The Rocks in the 19th and early 20th centuries, and which remains a rare townscape complete with laneways and rear yards intact.

Of aesthetic significance as an example of the public housing tenements constructed by the Housing Board between 1912 and 1924, the building is a valuable example of the Australian Federation architectural style as it was applied to a new building type in the early 20th century. 140–142 Cumberland Street is one of two surviving segments of a much larger housing development which is significantly associated with the Housing Board, the first government agency established solely for the provision of housing. Together with the small number of other Housing Board buildings in The Rocks (including 46–56 Gloucester Street and 117 Gloucester Street), 140–142 Cumberland Street represents the changing role of government in the provision of welfare services to the populace from the turn of the 20th century.

Tenements was listed on the New South Wales State Heritage Register on 10 May 2002 having satisfied the following criteria.

The place is important in demonstrating the course, or pattern, of cultural or natural history in New South Wales.

140–142 Cumberland Street is historically significant as a key component in demonstrating the evolution of the Long's Lane precinct, which is a unique ensemble in The Rocks of 19th and early 20th century residential buildings, laneways, and rear yards. 140–142 Cumberland Street is of historical significance in its own right as one of two surviving fragments remaining from a large public housing scheme fronting Gloucester, Cumberland, and Little Essex Streets. (The second fragment is at 117 Gloucester Street.) The scheme was carried out by the NSW Housing Board, the first agency in NSW to be established solely for the purpose of building and managing public housing. The Housing Board's work in The Rocks reflects the increasing role played by government in the welfare of citizens in the early 20th century.

The history of 140–142 Cumberland Street's decline into dereliction, and the occupation of the building by squatters prior to the conservation works of the early 1990s reflect the changing social context of The Rocks over the course of the 20th century. The decision of the State government to restore the building demonstrates the prevailing political will and public funding dedicated to the conservation of heritage in the post-Green Bans period in The Rocks. 140–142 Cumberland Street meets this criterion on a State level.

The place has a strong or special association with a person, or group of persons, of importance of cultural or natural history of New South Wales's history.

140–142 Cumberland Street is significant as one of a small number of buildings constructed under the Housing Act 1912 by the NSW Housing Board, the first agency to be established in NSW to deal directly with the provision of public housing.

The place is important in demonstrating aesthetic characteristics and/or a high degree of creative or technical achievement in New South Wales.

140–142 Cumberland Street is of aesthetic significance in showing the Edwardian /Australian Federation architectural style as it was applied to a new building type in the early 20th century. While drawing on public housing models from Europe and the UK, the design of the building emphasises its Australian location in the provision of balconies and the use of Australian motifs such as the waratah incorporated into the plaster vents. The aesthetic value of the building has been revealed and can now be better understood through reconstruction and conservation. 140–142 Cumberland Street makes a substantial contribution to the aesthetic significance of the Long's Lane Precinct as an ensemble of 19th and early 20th century buildings, associated laneways, and rear yards. 140-142 Cumberland Street meets this criterion on a State level.

The place has a strong or special association with a particular community or cultural group in New South Wales for social, cultural or spiritual reasons.

As part of The Rocks area, 140–142 Cumberland Street is likely to be held in some esteem by the individuals and groups who are interested in Sydney's history and heritage. 140–142 Cumberland Street meets this criterion on a local level.

The place has potential to yield information that will contribute to an understanding of the cultural or natural history of New South Wales.

The Long's Lane Precinct is of prime archaeological significance with its continued European occupation from at least the first quarter of the nineteenth century in a relatively undisturbed state. The Long's Lane Precinct is of educational value to specialists and the general public with its ensemble of nineteenth buildings, laneways and rear yards, and its significance is enhanced by the tangible relationship of the buildings and laneways to the documentary and oral historical information. 140–142 Cumberland Street is a valuable example of the prevailing architectural style as it was applied to a new building type in the first decades of the 20th century, and has the potential to contribute substantially to the understanding of the evolution of housing, in particular public housing constructed by government agencies, in NSW. The archaeological resource at 140–142 Cumberland Street is of potential research significance complementing the findings of previous archaeological investigations of adjacent sites in order to form a valuable resource for understanding early life in The Rocks area, and in particular the Long's Lane precinct. 140–142 Cumberland Street is of some technical significance as an example of "academic" conservation work in which reconstructed fabric was strictly based on extant material and constructed in a traditional manner. 140–142 Cumberland Street meets this criterion on a State level.

The place possesses uncommon, rare or endangered aspects of the cultural or natural history of New South Wales.

140–142 Cumberland Street is one remnant of a much larger development which was demolished in the mid-20th century. Together with 46–56 and 117 Gloucester Street, the building forms a very small group of buildings constructed for public housing by the NSW Housing Board. The Long's Lane Precinct is of significance as an ensemble of 19th and early 20th century buildings, associated laneways, and rear yards which is rare (probably unique) in the Sydney region and NSW. 140–142 Cumberland Street meets this criterion on a local level. The Long's Lane precinct meets this criterion on a State level.

The place is important in demonstrating the principal characteristics of a class of cultural or natural places/environments in New South Wales.

140–142 Cumberland Street is a good representative example of early-twentieth-century tenement housing within the context of the Long's Lane precinct, itself a significant area in demonstrating the 19th century townscape of The Rocks, complete with intact rear yards and laneways. 140–142 Cumberland Street meets this criterion on a local level. The Long's Lane precinct meets this criterion on a State level.

== Gallery ==
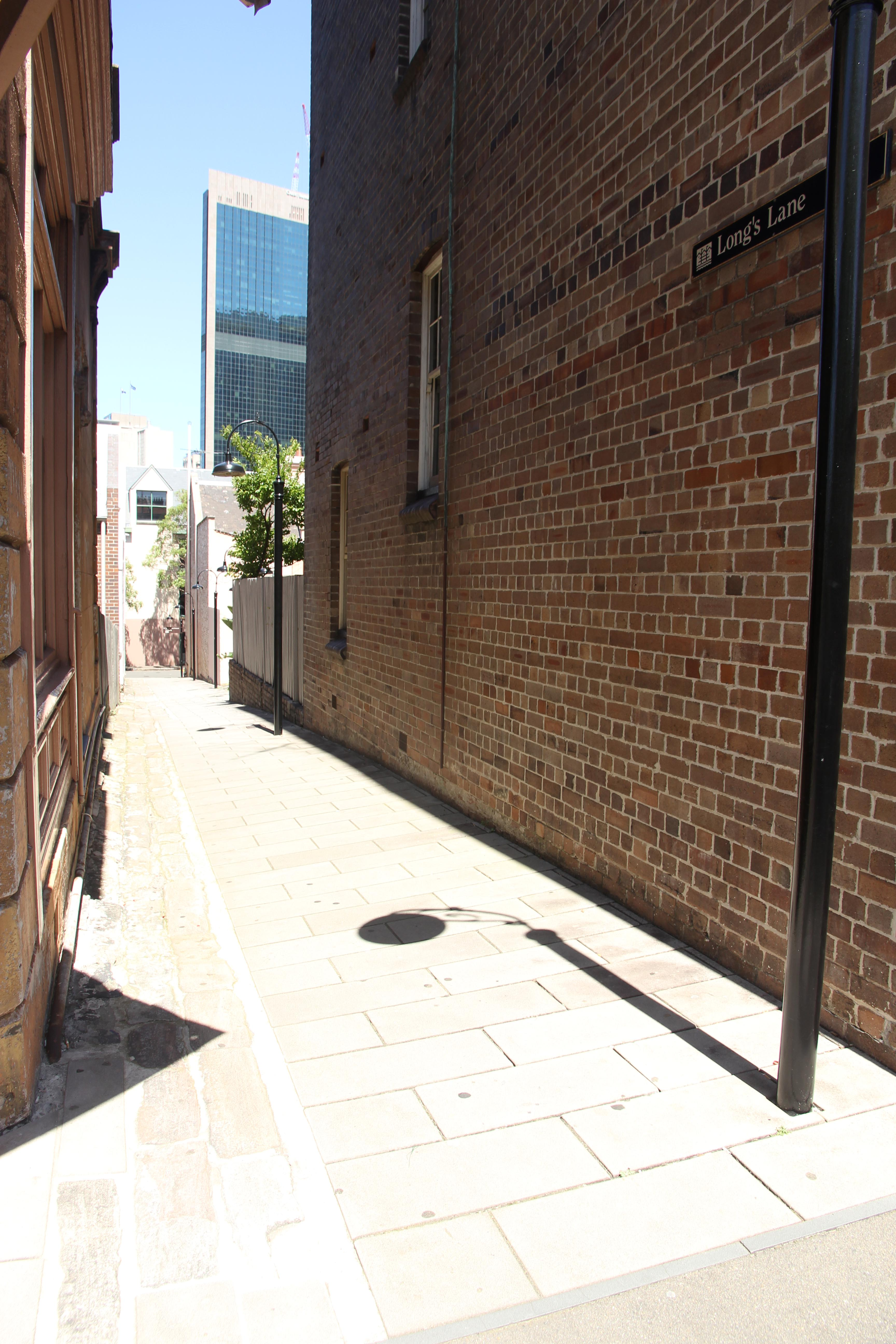
Long's Lane, looking from Cumberland Street towards Gloucester Street, pictured in 2019.

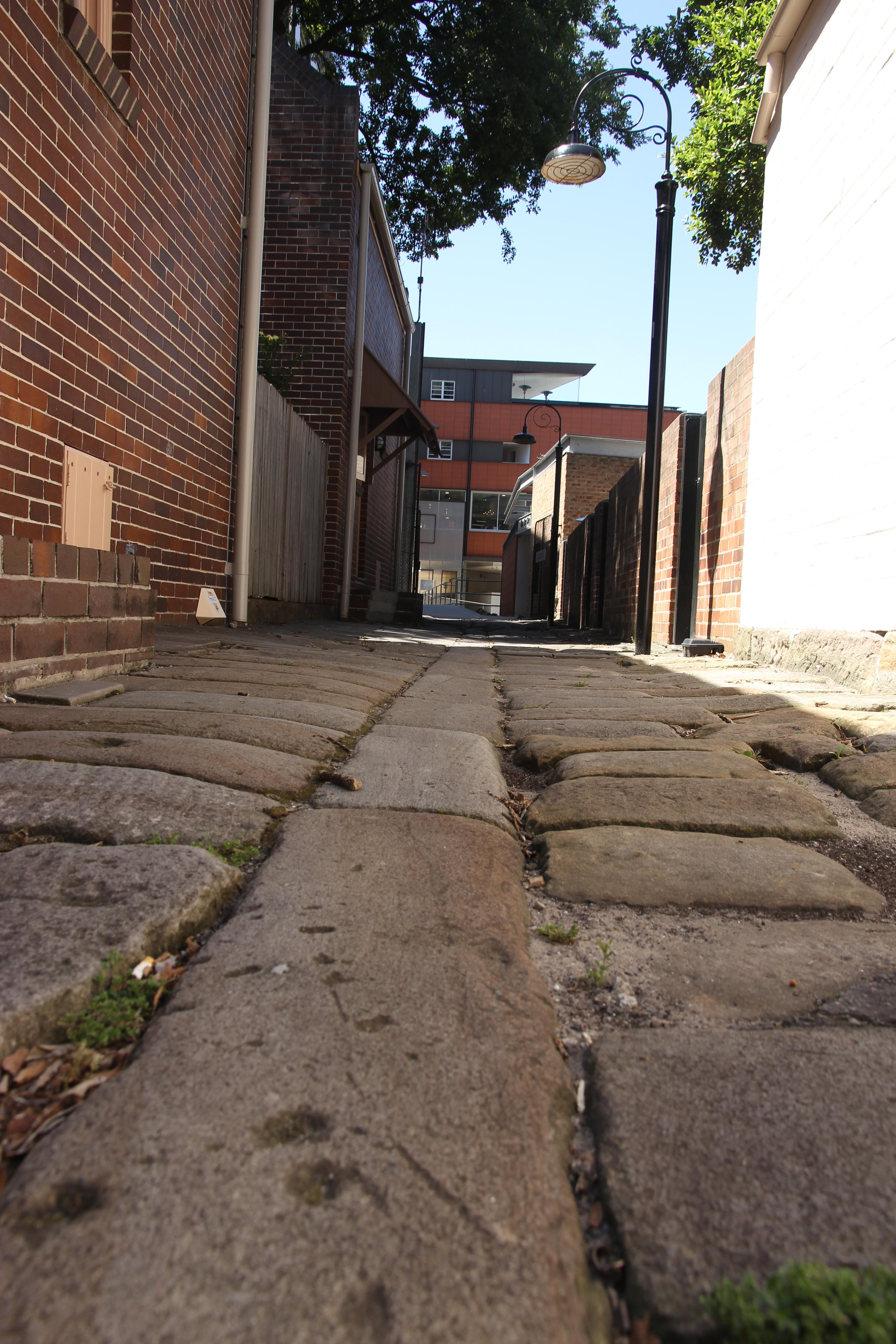
A sandstone laneway located within the precinct, leading towards the Big Dig Archaeological Site, pictured in 2019.

== See also ==
- Australian residential architectural styles
- Cumberland Street Archaeological Site
- Jobbins Terrace
- 113–115 Gloucester Street
- 117–117a Gloucester Street
- Lanes and alleyways of Sydney
