= Forgotten Songs =

Public artwork in Sydney, Australia

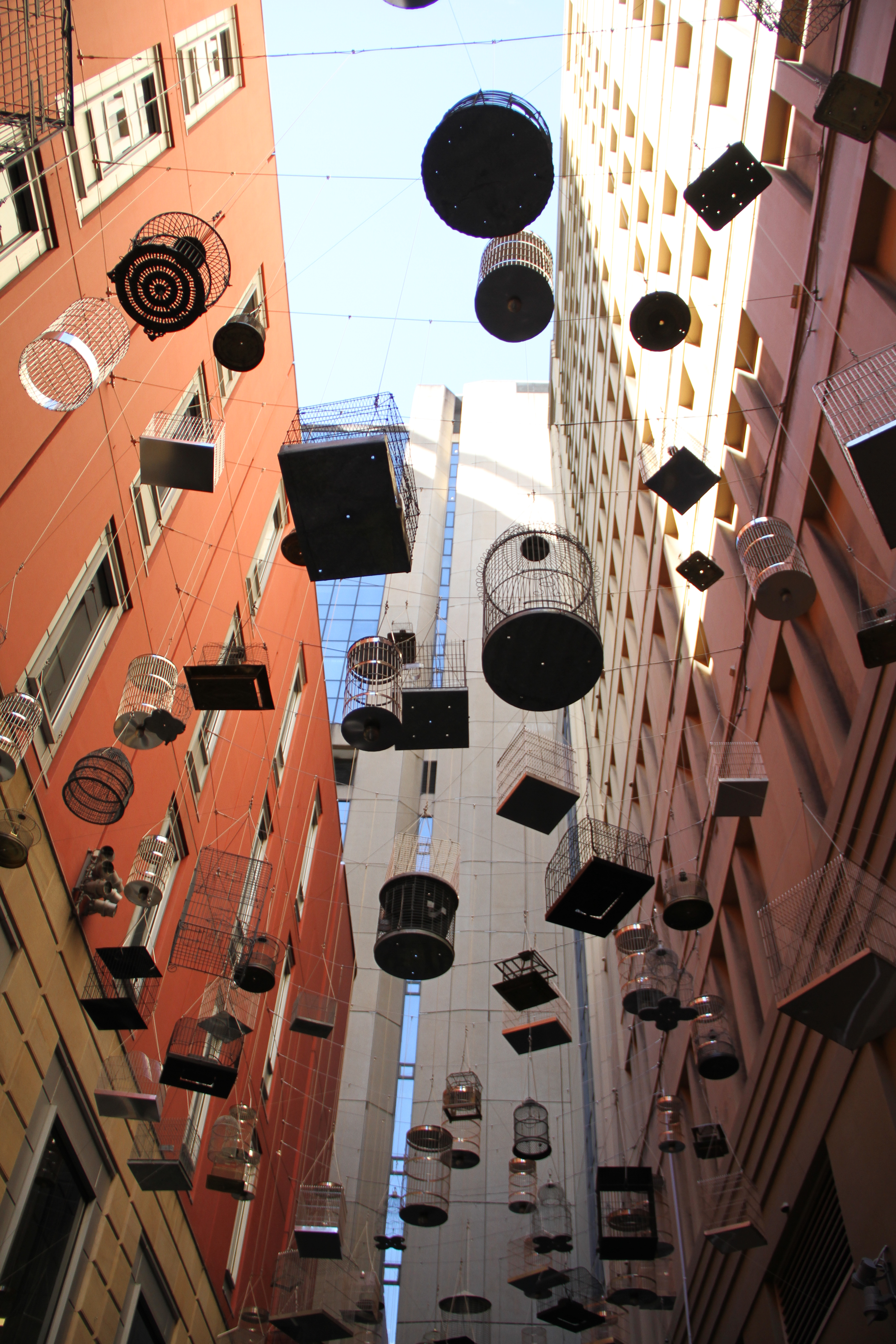
- Artist: Michael Thomas Hill
- Year: Temporary: 2009; Permanent: 2011
- Type: Public artwork
- Location: Angel Place (alleyway), Australia; 33.8671913°S 151.2072841°E

Forgotten Songs is a public artwork by Michael Thomas Hill located in Angel Place, Sydney. The installation was part of the 2009 Sydney Laneway Temporary art scheme. Afterwards, due to the popularity of the installation, in 2011, the project was turned into a part of the 9 million dollar permanent laneway installations.

The Laneway temporary art program ran between 2008 and 2013 with the main goal of laneways activation, innovation stimulation in the city and, in general, injecting new energy into the urban life. The program consisted of two stages. Forgotten Songs artwork was a part of the second Laneways program titled By George! Hidden Networks. The principal aim was to address two key issues of urban renewal in city's lanes and climate change. Other than Forgotten Songs installation, seven other artworks participated in this stage.

== Artwork concept ==
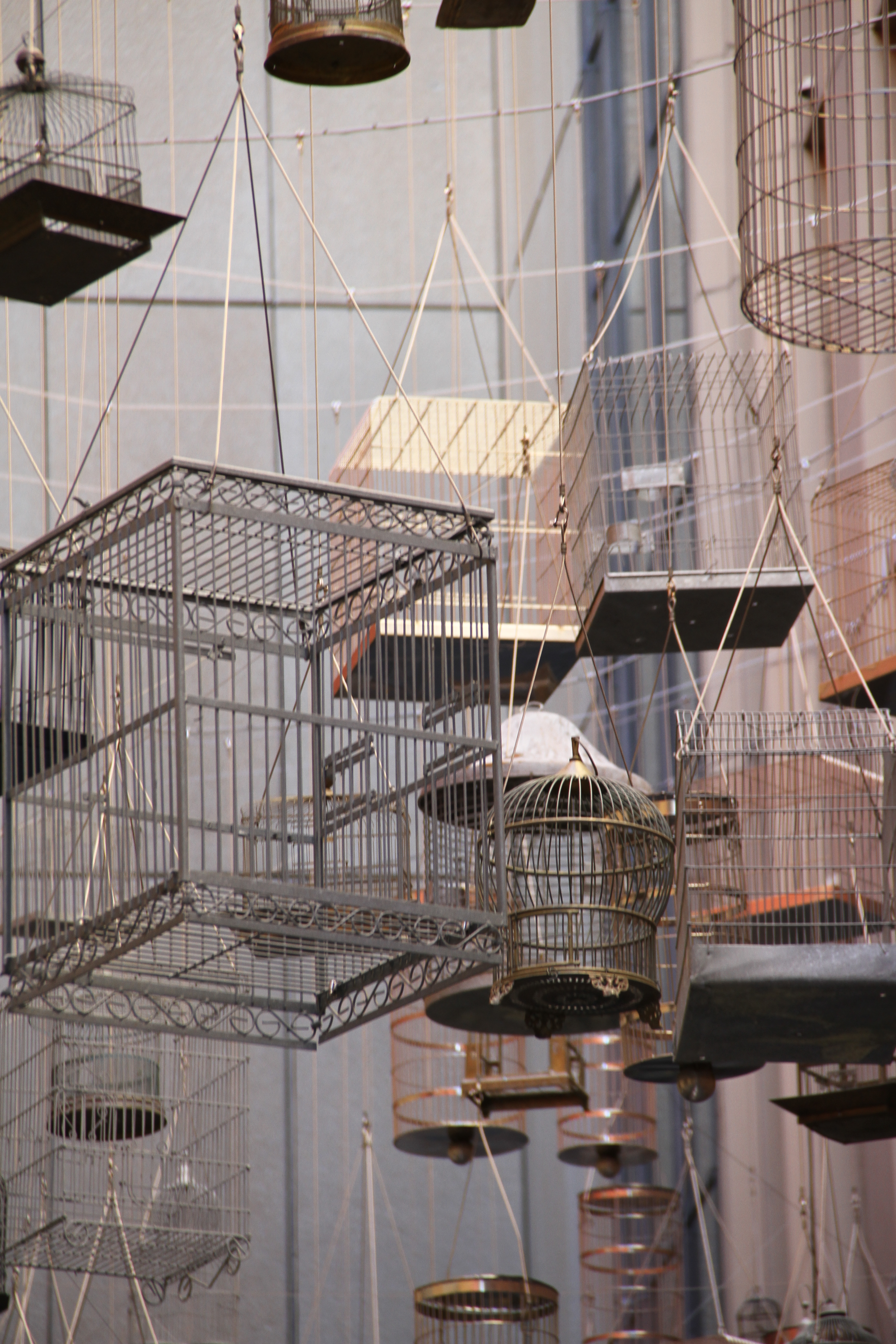
Birdcages (detail)

The artwork concept could be comprehended by the artist's words: "The installation explores how Sydney’s fauna has evolved and adapted to co-exist with increased urbanisation – inviting contemplation of the city’s past, its underlying landscape, and the sustainability issues associated with increased urban development."

=== Title ===
As a result, the artwork's title was selected to celebrate those birds which were living in central Sydney "before they were gradually forced out of the city by European settlement". The artist's intention was to return the birds' sounds to the city and make them an important part of city life.

== Installation ==
=== Birdcages ===
The artist has used 120 suspended bird cages in the laneway above Angel Place accompanied by the sound recordings of extinct or threatened bird species of central Sydney.

=== Bird songs ===
Recordings are played of the songs of fifty bird species which used to live in the central Sydney area on two audio tracks - day birds and night birds - with "a calendared sequence of triggers that progressively allows for longer days in summer and longer nights in winter". Some of these birds songs can still be heard on the city margins but not in central Sydney. Based on investigations of doctor Richard Major in regards to the city soil types and examining Australian Museum collection of bird skins, a list of 50 species of both diurnal and nocturnal birds was provided. Consequently, the sound files of those 50 species were gathered by the wildlife recordist, Fred van Gessel.

== Practical development of the project ==
External videos
- Audience - Forgotten Songs (2012)

In terms of the practical aspect of the project, about 120 birdcages sources from various places, from eBay to second-hand stores. And the artist claims that in order to get all those birdcages, his mother, sister and his relatives have been involved in collecting and picking those cages. The sound installation was made by installing all-weather speakers in some of the birdcages, which continually play birdsongs.

== Birds species ==
In addition to hearing the fifty bird songs as you walk through Angel Place, visitors can also read the names of the fifty bird species installed into the pavement as part of the installation. They are:

1. Barn owl
2. Brown gerygone
3. Brown thornbill
4. Brown-headed honeyeater
5. Brush cuckoo
6. Dollarbird
7. Dusky woodswallow
8. Eastern spinebill
9. Eastern whipbird
10. Eastern yellow robin
11. Fan-tailed cuckoo
12. Australian golden whistler
13. Grey fantail
14. Grey shrikethrush
15. Jacky winter
16. Leaden flycatcher
17. Little lorikeet
18. Mistletoebird
19. Owlet-nightjar
20. Pallid cuckoo
21. Powerful owl
22. Red-browed finch
23. Regent honeyeater
24. Rockwarbler
25. Rufous whistler
26. Scarlet Honeyeater
27. Scarlet robin
28. Shining bronze cuckoo
29. Southern boobook
30. Southern emu-wren
31. Spotted pardalote
32. Spotted quail-thrush
33. Striated thornbill
34. Superb fairywren
35. Superb lyrebird
36. Tawny frogmouth
37. Tawny-crowned honeyeater
38. Varied sittella
39. Variegated fairywren
40. Whistling kite
41. White-throated gerygone
42. White-browed scrubwren
43. White-browed woodswallow
44. White-eared honeyeater
45. White-naped honeyeater
46. White-throated nightjar
47. White-throated treecreeper
48. Wonga Pigeon
49. Yellow-tufted honeyeater
50. Yellow-faced honeyeater

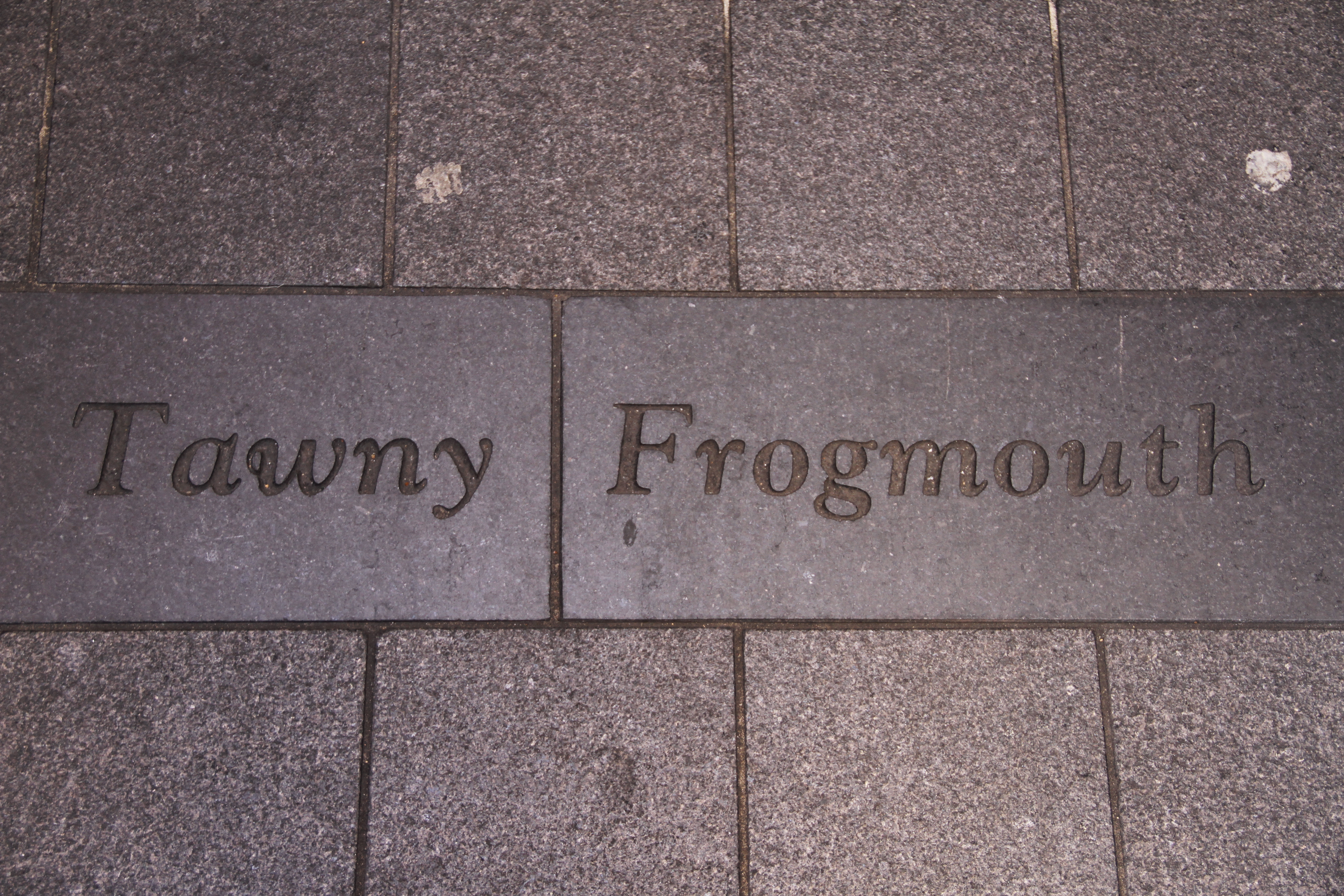
Example of bird species name set into pavement under the art work

Based on the bird species, some of them used to sing during the daytime, while some others during the nighttime. Therefore, song recordings change from day to night. At night, powerful owl, Southern boobook, Tawny frogmouth, Barn owl, Owlet-nightjar and White-throated nightjar songs might be heard.

== Design team ==
Forgotten Songs was the outcome of an interdisciplinary project, including Michael Thomas Hill as the artist, Dr Richard Major as the senior research scientist, Fred Van Gessel as the wildlife recordist, Lightwell as the audio system designer and programmer, Freeman Ryan Design as Graphic Design office and Aspect Studio as Landscape Architecture company.

== See also ==
- List of public art in the City of Sydney
- City Recital Hall
- List of endemic birds of Australia
- Lanes and alleyways of Sydney
