= 117–117a Gloucester Street, The Rocks =

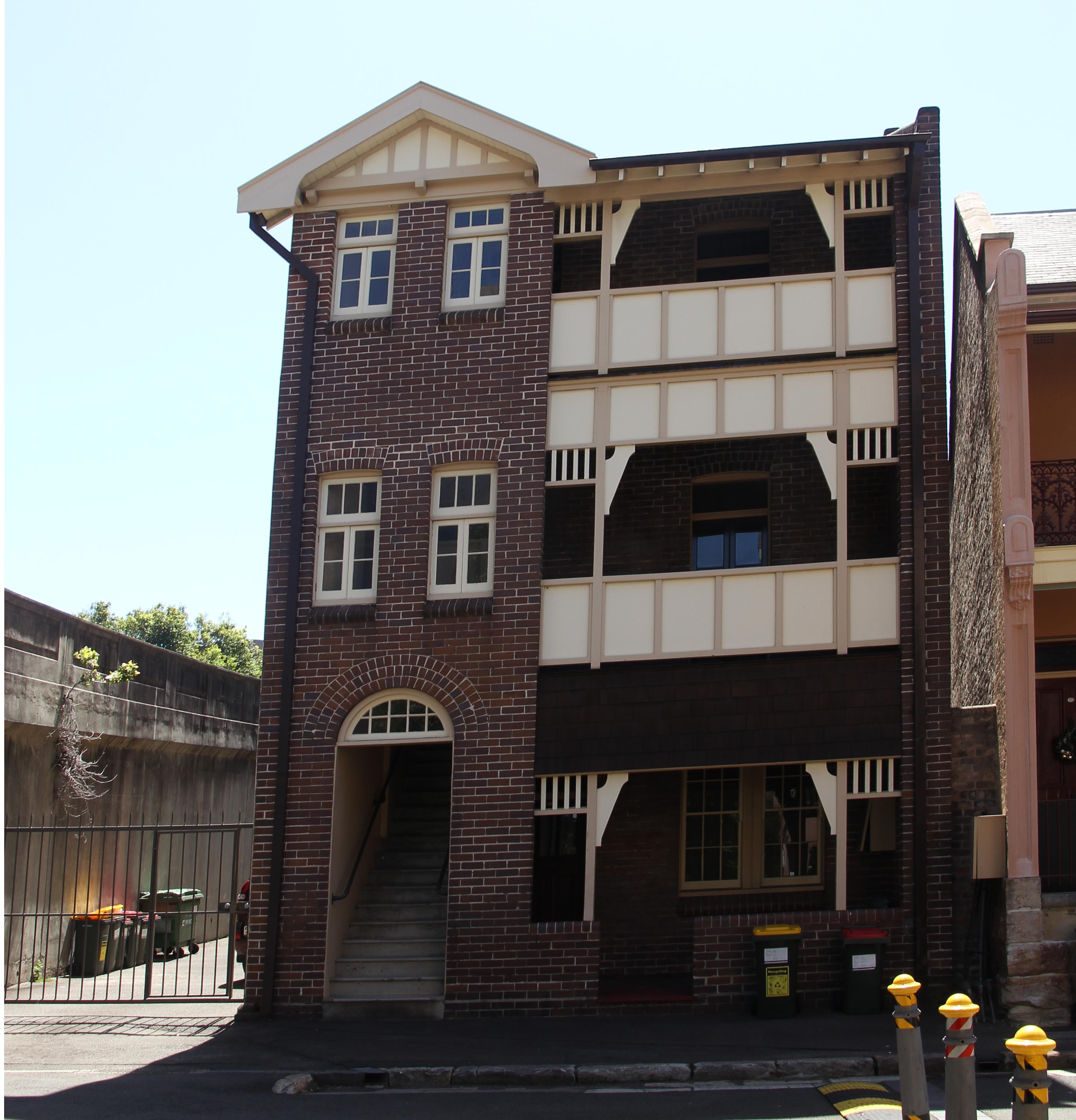
- 117–117a Gloucester Street, pictured in 2019. Houses to the left (south) of the image were demolished to make way for the Cahill Expressway.

- Location within Sydney Location within Australia
- 33.8608°S 151.2069°E
- Location: 117–117a Gloucester Street, The Rocks, City of Sydney, New South Wales, Australia

History
- Built: 1912–1915

Site notes
- Architect: W. Foggitt
- Architectural style: Australian Federation
- Owner: Property NSW

New South Wales Heritage Register
- Official name: Tenements; Longs Lane Terraces/Precinct (Long's)
- Type: State heritage (built)
- Designated: 10 May 2002
- Reference no.: 1598
- Type: Terrace
- Category: Residential buildings (private)

117–117a Gloucester Street, The Rocks is a heritage-listed terrace houses located in the Long's Lane Precinct at 117–117a Gloucester Street, in the inner city Sydney suburb of The Rocks in the City of Sydney local government area of New South Wales, Australia. It was designed by W. Foggitt and built from 1912 to 1915. It is also known as Longs Lane Terraces/Precinct (Long's). The property is owned by Property NSW, an agency of the Government of New South Wales. It was added to the New South Wales State Heritage Register on 10 May 2002.

== History ==
The formalisation of land claims in The Rocks commenced with grants made by Governor Darling in 1829 and continued for close to two decades. Allotment 21 of section 74 was formally granted to John Terry Hughes in January 1839.

In 1848, William Todd, on behalf of George Cooper Turner and Oswald Bloxsome, purchased the allotment. In turn Bloxsome and Thomas Iceton subdivided the land in 1853. Upon this subdivision Richard Wilde, a publican, purchased lots 7, 8, 9 and 10 for just over £2400.

Maps drawn between 1823 and 1842 show an L-shaped structure on Allotment 21 to the south of the study area, which was demolished by 1850. In its place was constructed a single-storey, two-roomed iron building, owned by Richard Wilde, the publican who owned the Erin Go Bragh hotel to the west (fronting Cumberland Street), and occupied by various tenants between 1861 and 1871. This structure again was to the south of the study area. The study area itself remained vacant apart from an iron shed, single storey with two rooms. A decade later the structure had been replaced by a pair of shops with four rooms. This building was later noted in the Rate Assessment Books as stables. In October 1872 Richard Wilde defaulted on a mortgage held by Faulkner Hope Bartlett, and was forced to sell the property for the sum of £1850. The new owner was noted as Robert Read Hickson.

Despite the presence of the stables in 1881, the property throughout this period and into the early twentieth century would more accurately be characterised as vacant land. A map from 1887 records an extensive yard on the property, probably part of stables owned by cab proprietor Patrick Mahoney, from 1885 to 1902, who rented the house from 1882 until 1902. Following an outbreak of the plague in Sydney and The Rocks the NSW government, under The Rocks Resumption Act 1901, resumed the area, which was barricaded to prevent further spread of infection. Some buildings were demolished, and in 1912 the NSW Housing Board began to construct housing in the vacant blocks of land in The Rocks.

The Housing Board, founded under the Housing Act 1912, was the first such agency in the state devoted to the construction of public housing. The board acquired land upon which buildings were constructed to be leased to "persons qualified under the Act" for business or residential purposes. The Housing Board examined public housing initiatives in the UK and Europe, and incorporated those ideas in constructing tenement dwellings in The Rocks. From 1912, the Housing Board built some 30 units in one development along Gloucester, Cumberland and Little Essex streets. In addition to housing, the Board also sought to ensure a mix of housing, corner shops, pubs and the like in the area. The new terraces, including 117 Gloucester Street, were built by J. H. Thompson of Bondi to the design of Board architect W. Foggitt. The first tenant of the new house at No. 117 (now numbered 119 Gloucester Street) was Charles Smith, of unknown occupation, who lived in the house from 1915 until at least 1932.

Of this large Housing Board development, only the northern units remain: the subject building at 117 Gloucester Street, and the building at 140-142 Cumberland Street. No. 117 demonstrates the typical Housing Board plan form, providing outdoor spaces in balconies, rear yards and roof top terraces. Parts of the Gloucester / Essex / Cumberland Streets Housing Board development were demolished in the 1920s to make way for the approaches to the Sydney Harbour Bridge. The remainder of the development was demolished with the construction of the Cahill Expressway in the 1950s to make way for the new freeway. No. 117 continued to be tenanted through the 1970s. The last house was vacated in the 1980s when the house was boarded up. Subsequently, squatters occupied the building. Many fixtures were stolen or demolished during this period, perhaps as a result of the boom in house renovations elsewhere in the inner city.

Between 1994 and 1995, an extensive programme of conservation works were carried out on the building. The work comprised stabilisation, restoration of the front façade and roofs, cutting in damp proof courses, and construction of new floors. Joinery, plastering, and other surface finishes were reconstructed based on surviving original fabric. The house is now divided into two separate units which are privately leased to tenants.

== Description ==
117–117A (described as 117–119 Gloucester Street in Conservation Plan by Clive Lucas, Stapleton & Partners and 119–119A Gloucester Street in SCA's Building Data Sheet) Gloucester Street is a part of the Long's Lane Precinct. Long's Lane is a cluster of nineteenth and early-twentieth houses, rear yards, and laneways between Gloucester and Cumberland Streets. 117 Gloucester Street is the only extant example in Gloucester Street of the NSW Government Housing Board redevelopment of the block bounded by Little Essex (now demolished), Cumberland and Gloucester Streets. All the original planning and much of the original architectural detail of this building is intact. The architectural quality of the Gloucester Building, although still significant and sympathetic, has been reduced by the demolition of the Little Essex Street block. A striking feature of the design of this building is the extensive structural use of reinforced concrete, and the use of cement in moulding details such as skirtings and cornices. This would appear to be an early example of the use of this technology.

Style: Edwardian / Australian Federation; Storeys: Three; Roof Cladding: Iron.

=== Condition ===
As of 28 September 2001, Archaeology Assessment Condition: Partly disturbed. Assessment Basis: Archaeological excavation (1994) involved the removal of occupation deposits from the kitchens of 113-115, dating from 1881 to c. 1930s. Deposits in the rest of the properties were untouched with the exception of 300×300 excavations in the centres of each of the four main ground floor rooms in 113-115 for the construction of floor supports. All services were surface mounted beneath floor joists to avoid disturbance of potential archaeological remains. An existing service trench in 117 was re-excavated and utilised for the same purpose. Pre 1912 deposits in 117 untouched. Investigation: Historical research and assessment of archaeology. Partly disturbed.

=== Modifications and dates ===
- 1992–97: Conservation and restoration of the Long's Lane precinct.

== Heritage listing ==
117–117a Gloucester Street, The Rocks was listed on the New South Wales State Heritage Register on 10 May 2002 having satisfied the following criteria.

The place is important in demonstrating the course, or pattern, of cultural or natural history in New South Wales.

117 Gloucester Street is historically significant as a key component in demonstrating the evolution of the Long's Lane precinct, which is a unique ensemble in The Rocks of 19th and early 20th century residential buildings, laneways, and rear yards. 117 Gloucester Street is of historical significance in its own right as one of two surviving fragments remaining from a large public housing scheme fronting Gloucester, Cumberland, and Little Essex Streets. (The second fragment is at 140-142 Cumberland Street.) The scheme was carried out by the NSW Housing Board, the first agency in NSW to be established solely for the purpose of building and managing public housing. The Housing Board's work in The Rocks reflects the increasing role played by government in the welfare of citizens in the early 20th century. The history of 117 Gloucester Street's decline into dereliction, and the occupation of the building by squatters prior to the conservation works of the early 1990s reflect the changing social context of The Rocks over the course of the 20th century. The decision of the State government to restore the building for residential (rather than commercial) purposes demonstrates the prevailing political will and public funding dedicated to the conservation of heritage in the post-Green Bans period in The Rocks. 117 Gloucester Street meets this criterion on the State level.

The place has a strong or special association with a person, or group of persons, of importance of cultural or natural history of New South Wales's history.

117 Gloucester Street is significant as one of a small number of buildings constructed under the Housing Act 1912 by the NSW Housing Board, the first agency to be established in NSW to deal directly with the provision of public housing. 117 Gloucester Street does not meet this criterion on either a local or State level.

The place is important in demonstrating aesthetic characteristics and/or a high degree of creative or technical achievement in New South Wales.

117 Gloucester Street is of aesthetic significance in showing the Edwardian / Australian Federation architectural style as it was applied to a new building type in the early 20th century. While drawing on public housing models from Europe and the UK, the design of the building emphasises its Australian location in the provision of verandahs and flat roof terraces, the predominant use of structural timber in the verandahs, and the use of Australian motifs such as the waratah incorporated into the plaster vents. The aesthetic value of the building has been revealed and can now be better understood through reconstruction and conservation. 117 Gloucester Street makes a substantial contribution to the streetscape significance of The Rocks, particularly in complementing the terraced character of Gloucester Street (including the Jobbins Building at 103–111 Gloucester Street, the terrace houses at 113–115 Gloucester Street, the Edwardian Cottages at 46–56 Gloucester Street, Susannah Place at 58–64 Gloucester Street, and Baker's Terrace at 66–72 Gloucester Street). 117 Gloucester Street makes a substantial contribution to the aesthetic significance of the Long's Lane Precinct as an ensemble of 19th and early 20th century buildings, associated laneways, and rear yards. 117 Gloucester Street meets this criterion on the State level.

The place has a strong or special association with a particular community or cultural group in New South Wales for social, cultural or spiritual reasons.

As part of The Rocks area, 117 Gloucester Street is likely to be held in some esteem by the individuals and groups who are interested in Sydney's history and heritage, however, this esteem does not meet the threshold to be described as significant for this criterion. 117 Gloucester Street does not meet this criterion on either the local or State level.

The place has potential to yield information that will contribute to an understanding of the cultural or natural history of New South Wales.

117 Gloucester Street is a valuable example of the prevailing architectural style as it was applied to a new building type in the first decades of the 20th century, and has the potential to contribute substantially to the understanding of the evolution of housing, in particular public housing constructed by government agencies, in NSW. The archaeological resource at 117 Gloucester Street is of potential research significance complementing the findings of previous archaeological investigations of adjacent sites in order to form a valuable resource for understanding early life in The Rocks area, and in particular the Long's Lane precinct. 117 Gloucester Street is of some technical significance as an example of "academic" conservation work in which reconstructed fabric was strictly based on extant material and constructed in a traditional manner. 117 Gloucester Street meets this criterion on the State level.

The place possesses uncommon, rare or endangered aspects of the cultural or natural history of New South Wales.

117 Gloucester Street is one remnant of a much larger development which was demolished in the mid-20th century. Together with 140-142 Cumberland Street and 46-56 Gloucester Street, the building forms a very small group of buildings constructed for public housing by the NSW Housing Board during its existence, between 1912 and 1924. The Long's Lane Precinct is of significance as an ensemble of 19th and early 20th century buildings, associated laneways, and rear yards which is rare (probably unique) in the Sydney region and NSW.

117 Gloucester Street meets this criterion on the local level. The Long's Lane precinct meets this criterion on the State level.

The place is important in demonstrating the principal characteristics of a class of cultural or natural places/environments in New South Wales.

117 Gloucester Street is a good representative example of early 20th century tenement housing within the context of the Long's Lane precinct, itself a significant area in demonstrating the 19th century townscape of The Rocks, complete with intact rear yards and laneways. 117 Gloucester Street meets this criterion on the local level. The Long's Lane precinct meets this criterion on the State level.

== See also ==
- Australian residential architectural styles
- Long's Lane Precinct
- 113-115 Gloucester Street
