= Cumberland Street Archaeological Site =

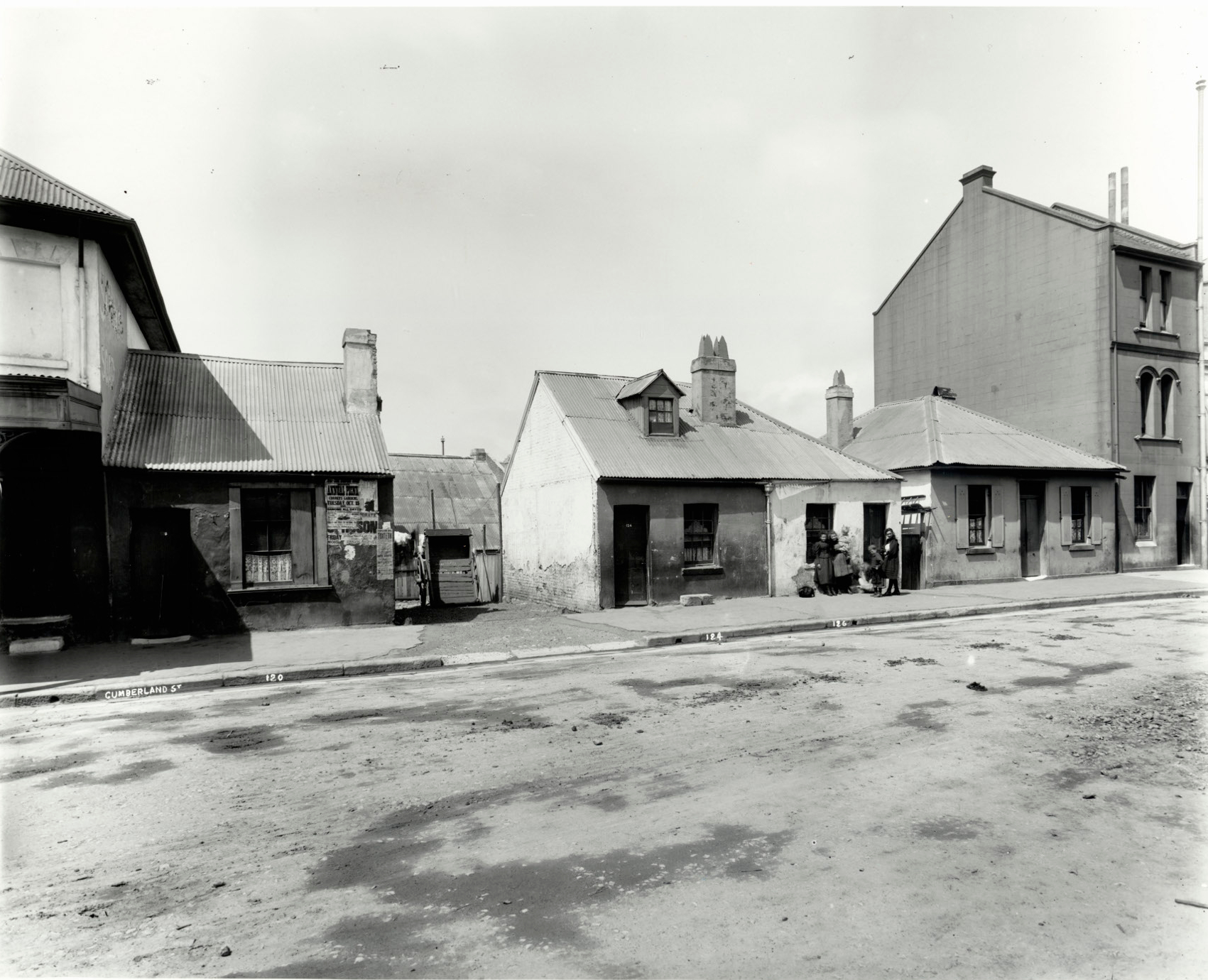
- Numbers 120–130 Cumberland Street, The Rocks, part of the archaeological site, pictured in October 1901.

- Location within Sydney Location within Australia
- 33.8601°S 151.2070°E
- Location: 106–128 Cumberland Street, The Rocks, City of Sydney, New South Wales, Australia

History
- Built: 1795–

Site notes
- Owner: Property NSW

New South Wales Heritage Register
- Official name: Cumberland Street Archaeological Site; The Big Dig Site; Sydney YHA; Big Dig Education Centre
- Type: State heritage (archaeological-terrestrial)
- Designated: 17 December 2010
- Reference no.: 1845
- Type: Townscape
- Category: Urban Area

The Cumberland Street Archaeological Site is a heritage-listed archaeological site located at 106–128 Cumberland Street in the inner-city Sydney suburb of The Rocks in the City of Sydney local government area of New South Wales, Australia. The site includes the remains of early convict-era housing dating as far back as 1795, and a modern youth hostel has been built elevated over the remnants. It is also known as The Big Dig Site, Sydney YHA, and the Big Dig Education Centre. The property is owned by Property NSW, an agency of the Government of New South Wales, and it was added to the New South Wales State Heritage Register on 17 December 2010.

== History ==
The site's earliest known occupants were George Legg and Ann Armsden in 1795, followed by the Byrne family in 1805, George Cribb's butchery and hotel occupied over half the site from 1811–1829. Much of Section 74 sold by William Murrell, Edward Sandwell and William Perks in December 1827. Subdivided January 1834. Numerous allotment holders received grants under Section 75 as follows: Lot 8 granted to William Williams, 19 July 1838; Lot 9 granted to Margaret Byrne, 5 August 1835; Lot 10 granted to W. H. Chapman, 6 June 1836; Lot 11 granted to ?, 15 April 1840; Lot 12 granted to J. T. Hughes, 30 November 1840. The site was resumed in 1900–1902, and 30 buildings were demolished by 1915. Engineering works here from 1917–c. 1934. Vacant till 1994.

=== Historical summary ===
The archaeological site comprises sections of two city blocks granted initially in the 1830s and 1840s as Sections 74 and 75 of the town of Sydney. Historical research indicates that Europeans have occupied the site from at least as early as c.1795. During the 1790s and the early part of the nineteenth century, it became a focus for settlement for convicts and ex-convicts. It had a rich subsequent history characterised by progressive intensification of occupation during the nineteenth century. Following large scale resumption and clearing by the government between 1902 and 1915, the site has also been used for various light industrial and public utility purposes. It had remained undeveloped since the 1950s when a concrete slab was laid as the pavement for a bus depot. Since 1972, the site has been in the property of the Sydney Cove Redevelopment Authority and its successor, the Sydney Harbour Foreshore Authority. The site was subject to archaeological excavation in 1994.

=== Thematic history ===
==== Aboriginal cultures and interactions with other cultures ====
The Rocks area, including this archaeological site, witnessed some of the first encounters between the traditional owners, the Cadigal people, and the newly arrived settlers of the first and later second fleets. There was likely several years, a transition when both cultures lived close by each other and continued to occupy the same locale. Physical evidence collected during the extensive excavation of the site in 1994 included at least one piece of post-1790 porcelain, which had been expertly flaked by Aboriginal people, presumably for use as a useful tool.

==== Convicts, migrants and housing ====
The Rocks area was within the townsite most often associated with the early convict history of Sydney. Many convicts and emancipists lived in and around The Rocks, including on the subject site. The place was home and work for many convicts and, their presence was indelibly marked on the neighbourhood. The convict butcher George Cribb, who arrived in 1808 onboard the transport Admiral Gambier lived on the subject site until the later 1820s and is memorialised by the naming of the lane joining Cumberland and Gloucester Streets which bordered his pub, house and butcher shop, Cribbs Lane. Other convict families, such as Ann Armsden and her First Fleet husband George Legg lived across the lane from Cribb in a large stone house, built on top of and partially into the natural sandstone that gave the area its name. Some of these earliest European residents remained living in the neighbourhood well into the mid-nineteenth century, and their descendants for longer.

Alongside the convicts were also free settlers. Some, like Daniel King, who arrived free in 1817, married convict women. From the 1830s and onwards more families arriving free were settling in the area, especially as more tenements were constructed and tenant occupancy on the site increased.

The archaeological site remained a vibrant, occupied neighbourhood throughout the nineteenth century until it was marked for demolition during the plague clearances of the early twentieth century. Evidence of all the occupation levels from 1788 until the 1900s was to be found on the site and in the historical and archaeological resource.

==== Commerce and trade ====
Convict and free alike were involved in various trades in the archaeological site from the early 1800s, right through until the area's resumption and demolition. George Cribb operated his butchery and a pub from the corner of Gloucester Street and Cribbs Lane from 1808. During the 1860s, Owen Caraher, who like Cribb is remembered in the naming of Carahers Lane that ran north to south across the site, was making candles and soap in Gloucester Street. A bakery was operated by Thomas and James Share on the corner of Cumberland and Cribbs Lane from the 1830s, and later by Robert Berry. The residents utilised Berry's ovens for cooking their Sunday dinners, as ovens in private homes were rare. By 1889 the Dig Site was occupied by approximately 33 houses, shops and hotels.

==== Township - suburb and community ====
The archaeological site existed as part of the broader Rocks community, from its earliest phase to the beginnings of the twentieth century. The Rocks was Sydney's and Australia's first suburb. The community on the site represented a broad cross-section of the people living in The Rocks through the later eighteenth and nineteenth century; bond and free, rich and poor. The community bonds were often strong amongst the families living there. The historical record shows that the residents' sons and daughters often lived close by when they left home. Several mariner's wives are reported to have moved back to their parents' homes when their husbands were away at sea. Many families lived on the site over successive generations. Reports also exist of local families taking in orphans of their parents' friends rather than sending them to the Destitute Asylum or other institution.

As with any community, however, there were less altruistic members of the Cumberland/Gloucester Streets community as well. Exploitation, crime and violence were also present on the site. Hotels and brothels operated alongside the bakeries and corner shops. Houses were often small and conditions cramped, which added to the tensions of poverty that some residents experienced and strengthened the feeling of community that existed within the site. Combining these factors, the crowded streets, back lanes and hotels gave the outside world the impression that the area was an urban slum, a reputation that stayed with The Rocks and subject site for much of its history.

==== Government and administration ====
For much of the archaeological site's history, a perception existed that the site lay outside the official Government's boundaries and administrative reach. However, in 1900 following the plague outbreak in Sydney, the Government resumed The Rocks area. The Government became the landlord for approximately 900 properties in The Rocks area, including all of the subject site. With a view to cleaning up the worst areas of The Rocks and imposing some order on the remnant colonial landscape, parts of The Rocks were marked for demolition and redevelopment. The subject site was demolished entirely between 1902 and 1915. Houses, shops and hotels were all cleared away, and the residents either relocated in The Rocks area or moved away completely. The work brought to a decisive end the residential history of the subject site.

For the remainder of the twentieth century, the archaeological site was leased to a variety of users, including machinery and joinery workshops, the City Railway Workshops, motor garages, the NRMA and Department of Motor Transport and Tramways as a bus parking station, and later as a Sydney Cove Redevelopment Authority commissioning the archaeological excavation and historical research that was undertaken on the site in the early- and mid-1990s. This work led to the rediscovery of the residential community that had once occupied the subject site.

==== 2006-2010 ====
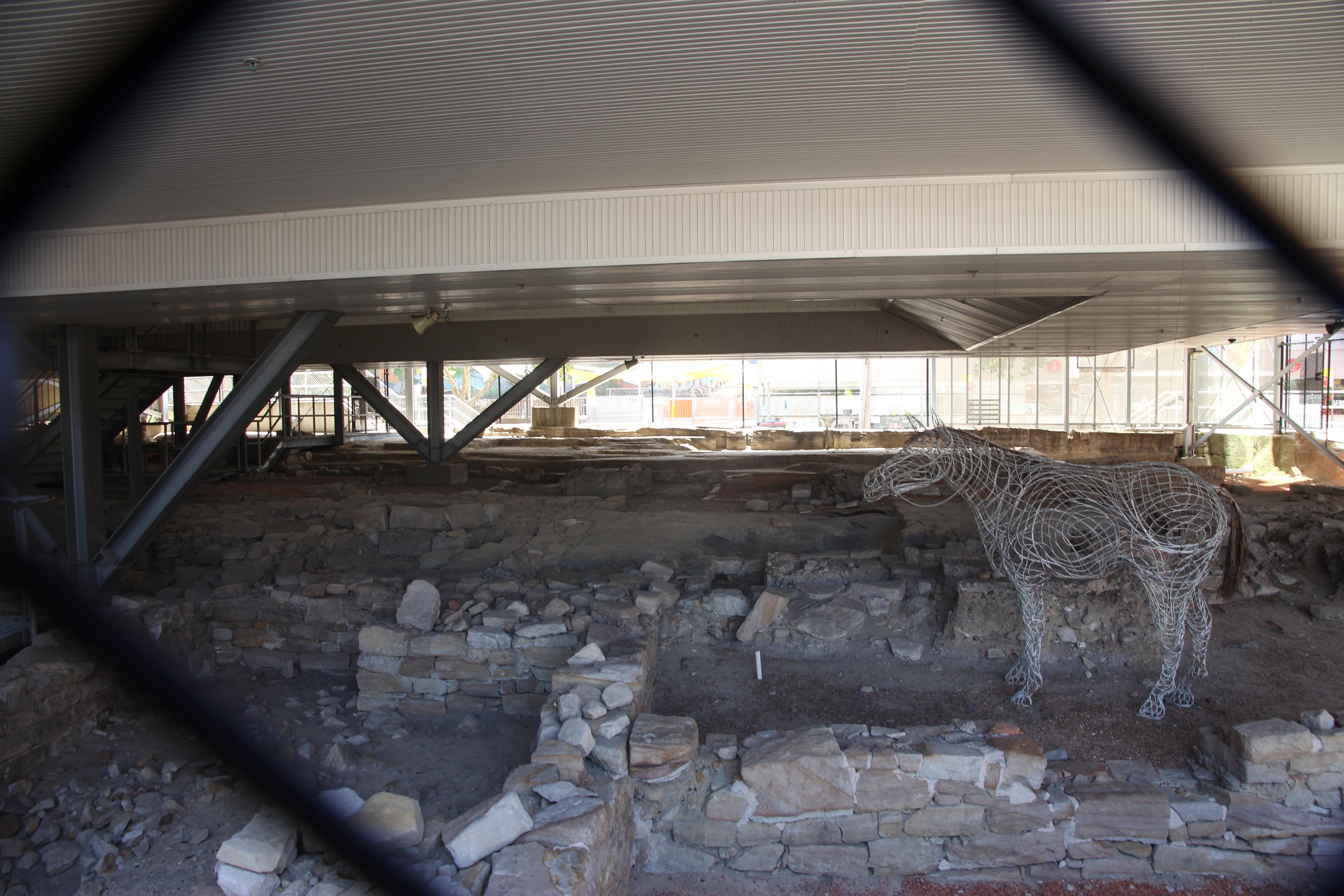
A modern sculpture located in The Big Dig Archaeological Site, underneath the foundations of the YHA Sydney Harbour, pictured in 2019.

Sydney Harbour Foreshore Authority's panel selected the winning proposal for the site by Youth Hostels Australia for a state-of-the-art, energy-efficient hostel with an additional twin classroom education centre. YHA Ltd is a not-for-profit organisation that returns profits from earnings into its capital assets. Construction of Sydney Harbour YHA and The Big Dig Archaeology Education Centre took place between September 2008 and October 2009. During construction the archaeological remnants on site were carefully covered by a protective layer of sandbags and scaffolding, removed when the construction work was completed. The buildings are supported by structural-steel trusses spanning over the archaeological remains, allowing over 85% of the site to be visible at ground level. The site's physical impact is restricted to 52 metres (171 ft) in areas carefully chosen in consultation with the archaeologists.

The 106-room Sydney Harbour YHA hostel and The Big Dig Archaeology Education Centre were officially opened in April 2010. It is the largest archaeological urban development completed in Australia of its time. This carefully incorporated retention and display of the archaeological resource, including elevating the building above ground level, reconstructing the original laneways as thoroughfares through the building and site, open voids in the building to view the archaeology, and construction of a Big Dig building for education about the dig site. Ongoing resources were also committed to funding further interpretation of the early history of the site.

== Description ==
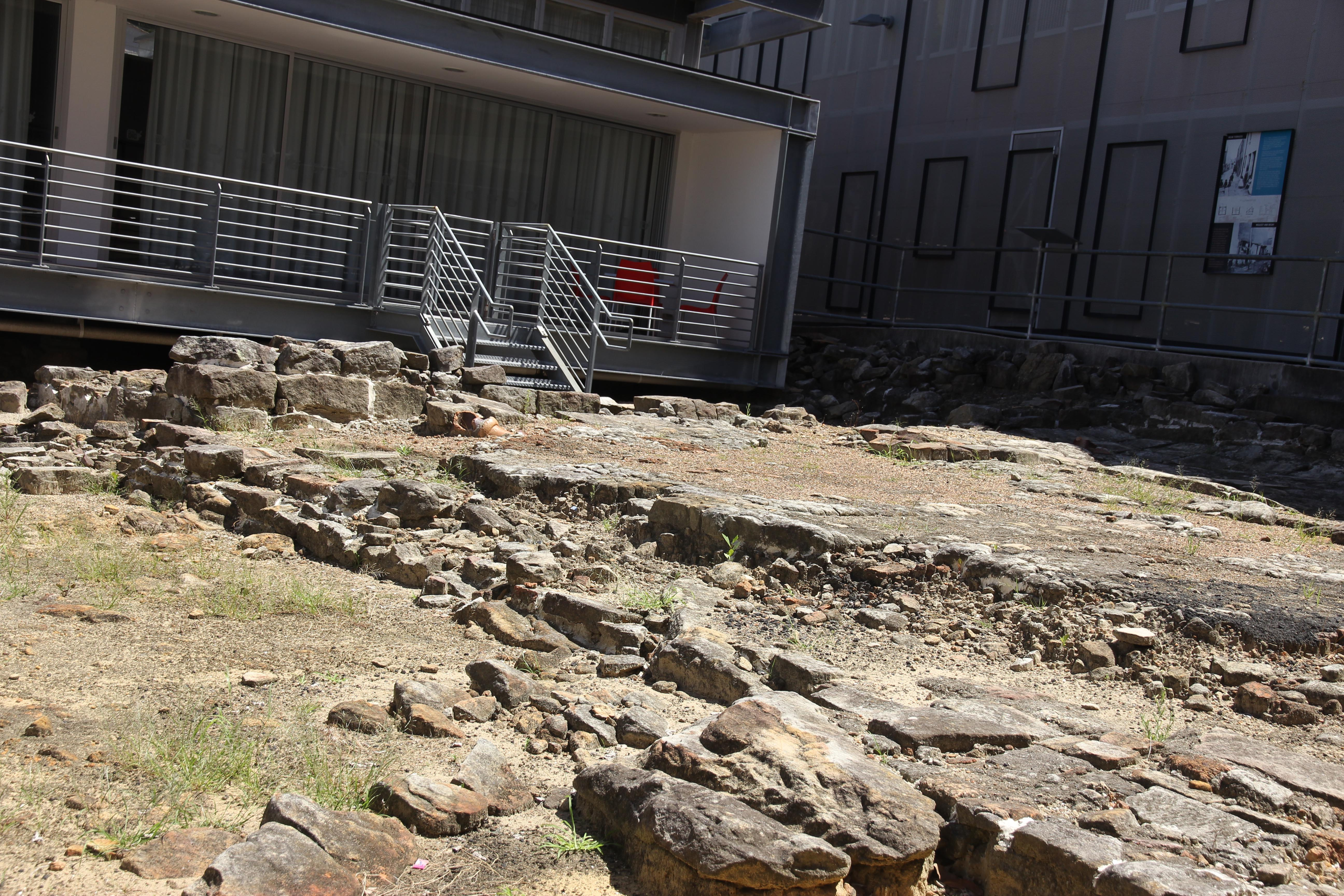
Site remnants with The Big Dig Archaeology Education Centre surrounding the archeological site, pictured in 2019.

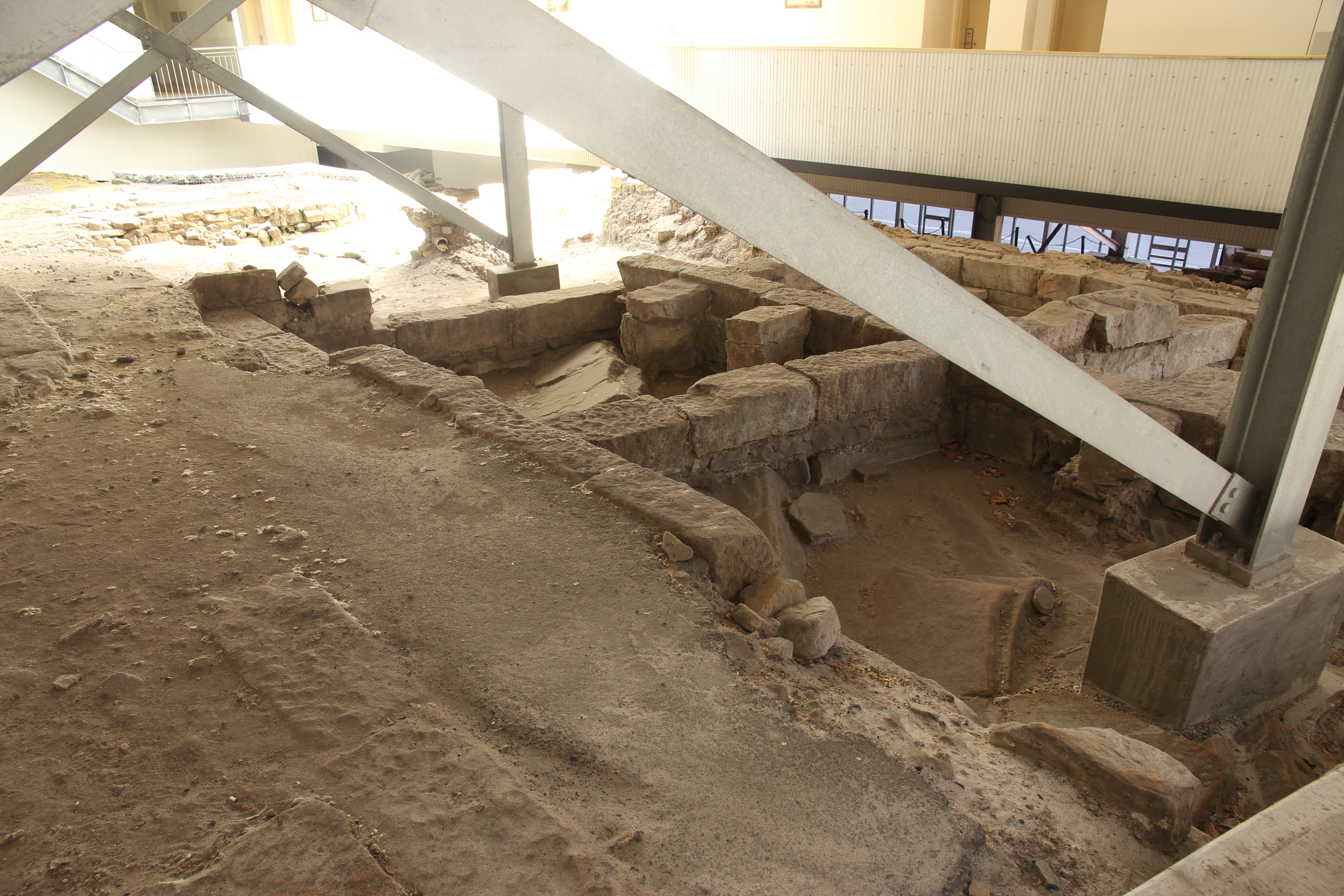
Remnants and building foundations below some of the YHA Sydney buildings, pictured in 2019.

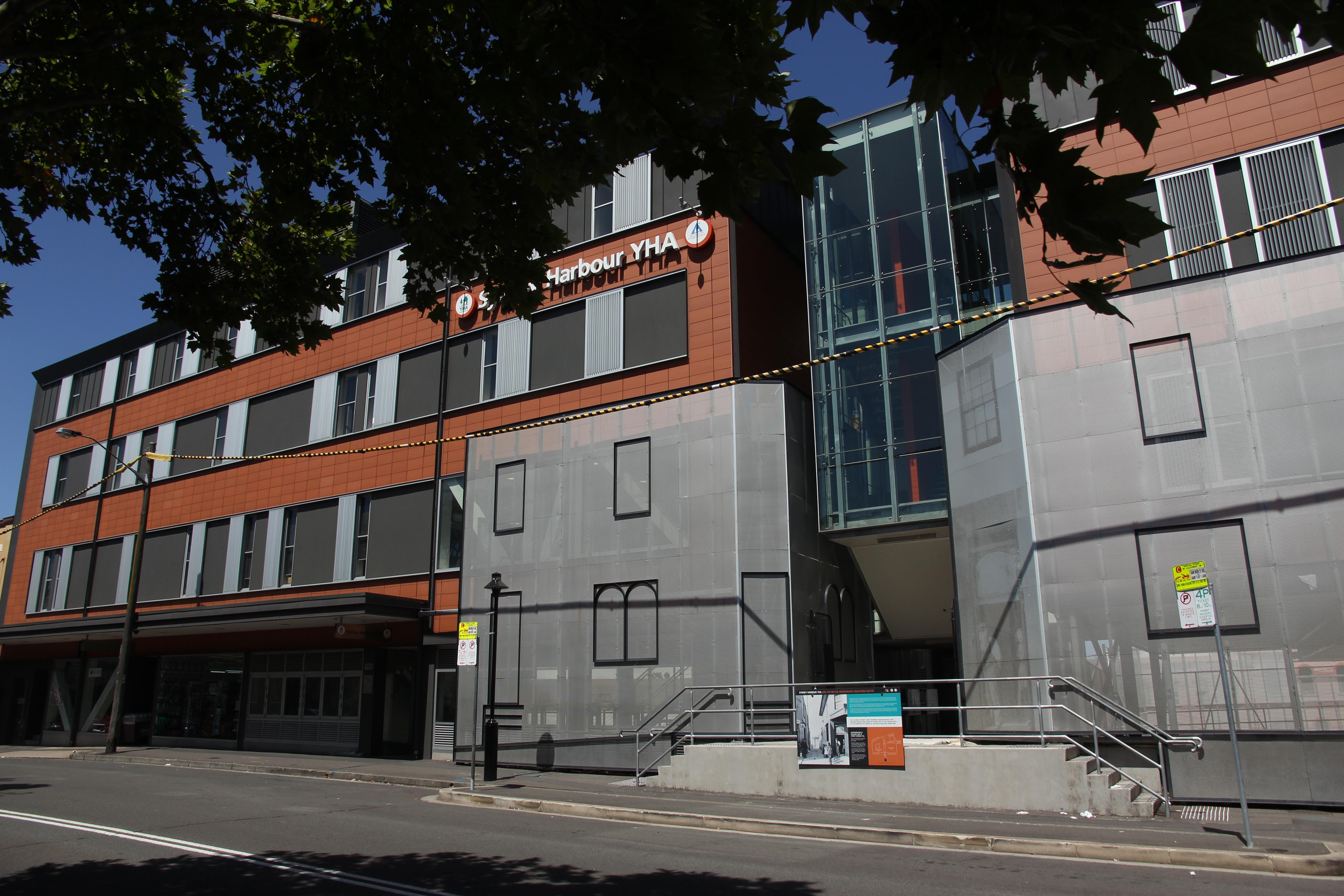
Looking across Cumberland Street towards the YHA showing the void at ground level that provides access to the archaeological site; with the YHA administration and accommodation in the upper levels.

The archaeological site contains remnant structural features and deposits found on the western side of Sydney Cove between Cumberland Street and Gloucester Street, between the Australian Hotel to the north and the Jobbins Buildings (and other structures) adjacent to the Cahill Expressway to the south.

A Youth Hostel (YHA) elevates over the excavated archaeological site, which includes an archaeology education centre and integrated interpretation. he new light-weight building is suspended above the archaeology, supported by a minimal number of pillars resulting from structural steel's innovative use. The building has minimal impact upon the relics and provides increased visual and physical access through interior building voids, two reconstructed historic laneways (Cribbs and Carahers Lanes), interpretative works, and artefact displays in the new building.

=== Condition ===
As of 27 July 2007, Assessment Condition: Minor Disturbance, Archaeological Excavation of c.70% of the resource, 1994. Assessment Basis: Excavations in 1994 revealed an exceptionally well-preserved resource with over 750,000 artefacts recovered. The site preserves approximately 60% of its pre-1830 resource and 100% of remains of eight terraces built in the 1840s–1850s and demolished c. 1905. Investigation: Full-scale excavation, 1994. Other smaller-scale excavations have been carried out by the University of Sydney Summer School in 2005 & 2006.

The site was subject to archaeological investigation in 1994. The excavated site itself stands as testimony to the extent of excavation work completed and the array of historic structures and features revealed. The investigation uncovered substantial masonry remains of at least 46 buildings, post holes and more ephemeral remains of other timber structures, two major laneways, ancillary paths, stone-lined cesspits, tanks, or wells carved into living rock and a wide variety of other landscape features. The remains have been retained in situ and generally survive intact.

Excavation of the archaeological site required removing approximately 1500 contexts or deposits ranging from concrete and bitumen pavements through dumps of building rubble or demolition and occupation accumulation. These features have been removed from the site; however, where relevant, samples have been retained for future analysis. Several areas of the archaeological site remain unexcavated or partially excavated. These unexcavated areas generally remain intact. Some deposits and other material have been introduced to the site since the 1994 investigation to protect or stabilise the exposed remains (e.g. wells and cesspits were lined with Bidum and backfilled). The Authority has also introduced gravel/pebbles and other materials for interpretative purposes.

Approximately 750,000 individual artefacts were recovered from the archaeological site during the excavation. They are now stored off-site.

A youth hostel was constructed on the site, completed in 2009. This carefully incorporated retention and display of the archaeological resource, including elevating the building above ground level, reconstructing the original laneways as thoroughfares through the building and site, and constructing a Big Dig building for education about the dig site. Ongoing resources were also committed to funding further interpretation of the early history of the site.

=== Modifications and dates ===
- c. 1795–1901 – various residential and commercial uses, demolition of some buildings due to the Darling Harbour resumptions in response to the bubonic plague outbreak in 1900.
- 1917 – Norton Griffiths machinery and joinery works.
- 1918 – City Railway Workshops.
- 1921–1924 – Department of Repatriation Vocational Training Trade School.
- 1925–1931 – motor garages.
- 1951–1972 – Department of Road Transport and Tramways bus depot.
- 1972–1994 – Storage Area
- 1994 – Archaeological Excavation
- 2009 – Youth Hostel building construction complete

== Heritage listing ==
As of 15 October 2010, dating from 1795, the archaeological site has outstanding cultural significance as rare surviving evidence of the mostly convict and ex-convict community established on The Rocks at the time of Australia's first European settlement. The site contains identified relics of 46 historic houses, two lanes, and other features on two early Sydney town lots. It is one of few surviving places in The Rocks where a substantial physical connection exists to the time of first settlement, including the huts and scattered houses built on and carved into the sandstone outcrops that gave The Rocks its name.

The site has strong historical associations, providing physical evidence of nineteenth-century events, processes and people. Through this association and the extraordinary level of public involvement in the 1994 excavation, the site has high social and public value as a "historic site". Located within a historic precinct, the substantial physical evidence of the site has distinctive visual qualities and evocative capacity.

The site's archaeological significance continues through both the information being revealed by analysis of excavated material and continuing in situ presence of substantial structural elements and deposits. The in situ relics also have the potential to yield further information relating to substantive historical research questions. The site has a unique ability to provide a "hands-on" experience of important phases of Sydney's history and development and has high interpretative and educational potential.

The 2004–2010 archaeological investigation and redevelopment of the site is an outstanding example of best practice archaeological management and interpretation in Australia. The sensitive construction of a Youth Hostel (YHA) over the archaeological site and integrated interpretation of this archaeological site has received multiple awards in design and heritage. The YHA development has been described as arguably one of the best contemporary examples of in-situ conservation of archaeological remains in an urban context anywhere in the world.

Cumberland Street archaeological site was listed on the New South Wales State Heritage Register on 17 December 2010, having satisfied the following criteria.

The place is important in demonstrating the course, or pattern, of cultural or natural history in New South Wales.

The occupation of The Rocks during the first decades of the Sydney Cove settlement represented a significant phase and important activity in the early life and development of the Sydney community and the City of Sydney itself. It was the quarter of the town built, shaped and occupied mostly by convicts and ex-convicts. The site's physical elements provide a material dimension to this part of early Sydney history and evidence of the convict/ex-convict lifestyle. The latter is particularly significant as the organic growth of The Rocks settlement and lack of government regulation evident in the remains of houses contrasts the popular perceptions of convict life.

The Rocks were significant as both domicile and workplace for Sydney society's lower orders in the late eighteenth and early nineteenth century. Its history and development stand in stark contrast to that recorded for other sections of society in the official documentation. Features directly connected with the early occupation of The Rocks, particularly the evidence of material culture and buildings which have been revealed through archaeological investigation, reflect the taste habits and means, and hence the sociocultural characteristics of the site's inhabitants. The collection of artefacts provides evidence that leads to questions about the traditional view of this area during the late nineteenth century as a "blighted slum". The surviving structural elements in their size, construction, and format evoke a vanished community's living conditions.

Through historical records and surviving physical evidence, that site is associated with many significant phases of Sydney's history and processes that have shaped the growing colony's development. The subject site witnessed sporadic occupation, consolidation through permissive occupancy and leases, the introduction of land grants, varying phases of intensification and construction, wholesale resumption and clearing and, eventually, low key industrial and later government usage. It provides, in microcosm, a typical slice through the evolution and history of one of the most vital, lively and infamous communities in urban Australia.

The place has a strong or special association with a person, or group of persons, of importance of cultural or natural history of New South Wales's history.

The archaeological site represents, in microcosm, a slice of The Rocks life and community covering more than a century. It has strong links and association with a major Sydney community and a section of New South Wales society. The historical research already undertaken provides a depth and richness to our understanding of the individuals who lived there, none of whom is currently recognised as a "historical" figure in the traditional sense, but all of whom (certainly before the 1830s) might be characterised as pioneers of Sydney. The associational links are powerful because of the presence of actual building remains (and artefacts) that relate to known individuals, families and households.

The place is important in demonstrating aesthetic characteristics and/or a high degree of creative or technical achievement in New South Wales.

As an excavated historical archaeological site, the site has well defined visual quality. Within the physical context of The Rocks, and the setting of surrounding historic buildings, the site currently contributes to a rich amalgam of historical layering. This layering is particularly evident within the site itself, where historical events, phases and occupations are reflected in the fine grained texture of intersecting topography and structural remains. The place is instantly recognisable as a historic site.

The 2004–2010 excavation, interpretation and redevelopment of the site is an outstanding example of best practice archaeological management for Australia. The sensitive construction of a Youth Hostel (YHA) above the archaeological site and integrated interpretation of this archaeological site has received multiple awards in design and heritage. The YHA development has been described as arguably one of the best contemporary examples of in situ conservation of archaeological remains in an urban context anywhere in the world.

The new youth hostel building reconstructs the original laneways intersecting the site, providing important views to most parts of the site's archaeology as well as vistas from within and outside of the site. These allow an appreciation of the early 19th century layout of the buildings and lanes in this segment of the Rocks. The recreated view corridors and vistas created by the open lanes correspond to early historical photographs before the 19th century buildings were cleared at the turn of the century.

The place has a strong or special association with a particular community or cultural group in New South Wales for social, cultural or spiritual reasons.

The Rocks is now widely recognised as one of the key components of Australia's birthplace. As a focus of early convict settlement, the site occupies a particular conceptual niche. Furthermore, through the green bans of the 1970s, the resurgence in conservations programs of the 1980s and, via a continuing community spirit and pride in its community, The Rocks has already been established as a special place of particular importance to residents and visitors alike.

The archaeological site is one of few surviving places within The Rocks where a substantial physical connection exists with the time of first settlement and the huts and scattered houses on the rocky crags that gave "The Rocks" its name. The thousands of people who visited the archaeological site and participated in the 1994 excavation program at varying levels demonstrate its value to the contemporary community. Ongoing access to physical evidence and interpretation has potential to realise and enhance the social value of the place.

The place has potential to yield information that will contribute to an understanding of the cultural or natural history of New South Wales.

Archaeological deposits and features, particularly when considered in conjunction with documentary evidence can provide evidence of material culture that yields information which may by unavailable from documentary sources alone. This site and the collection of excavated material form a resource which contributes to a better understanding of social, economic and cultural history of Sydney and The Rocks community in particular.

Archaeological excavation at the site has already realised a substantial part of its archaeological potential. Many site specific research questions have been answered. Analysis of the data gathered has addressed major historical questions, including the impact of the industrial revolution, the rise of class, women's occupation and lives, the ongoing debate on the standard of living for working-class people in urban areas, the social and cultural role of The Rocks within the larger city, and the changing impact of Government over the historical period.

Some areas of the site remain unexcavated and have potential available for future investigation. While the excavation to date has produced a complete picture of the activities undertaken on the site, should it be decided in the future to excavate the remaining areas, it is expected that this new information would complement the information already gathered.

The physical remains at the site and the associated artefact collection provide major ongoing research opportunities in fields such as convictism, colonial settlement and working class communities, which are major themes in Australian history.

The place possesses uncommon, rare or endangered aspects of the cultural or natural history of New South Wales.

The archaeological site is believed to be the only substantial residential site (i.e. one containing an entire neighbourhood), remaining in Sydney's Rocks, that contains physical evidence of structures and material culture from the period of first settlement. The 1994 archaeological investigation recovered enormous quantities of artefacts and the remains of many structures - all of which survived here because of later twentieth century activity had not impinged greatly on the surviving features. In this respect, the archaeological site contrasts with many other places in urban Australia where the extent of building activity undertaken during the 1960s, 1970s and 1980s has removed structures and stratified deposits. Any area with potential for in situ preservation of relics from nineteenth century Sydney, and particularly the early part of the century or prior to 1800, represent a finite, rare and endangered resource.

The place is important in demonstrating the principal characteristics of a class of cultural or natural places/environments in New South Wales.

The continuous occupation of the archaeological site from the late eighteenth century throughout the nineteenth century provides the opportunity to experience and examine changes and development in society and particularly changes in home life and the use of domestic space. The evidence at the archaeological site demonstrates characteristics of both individual residences and a residential/Rocks community (including hotels, shops and other workplaces) during this period, providing a physical demonstration and important "hands on" opportunity to understand how earlier lifestyles and living conditions differed from those of today.

== See also ==
- History of Sydney
- Long's Lane Precinct
- Jobbins Terrace
- 113–115 Gloucester Street
- 117–117a Gloucester Street
