= Iceton =

Iceton is a surname. Notable people with the surname include:

- Jake Iceton (1903–1981), English footballer
- Lloyd Iceton (1920–1994), English footballer
- Thomas Iceton (1849–1908), Australian cricketer
- Steven Iceton (born 1982), Photographer
