= Fitzroy Terrace, Redfern =

Fitzroy Terrace
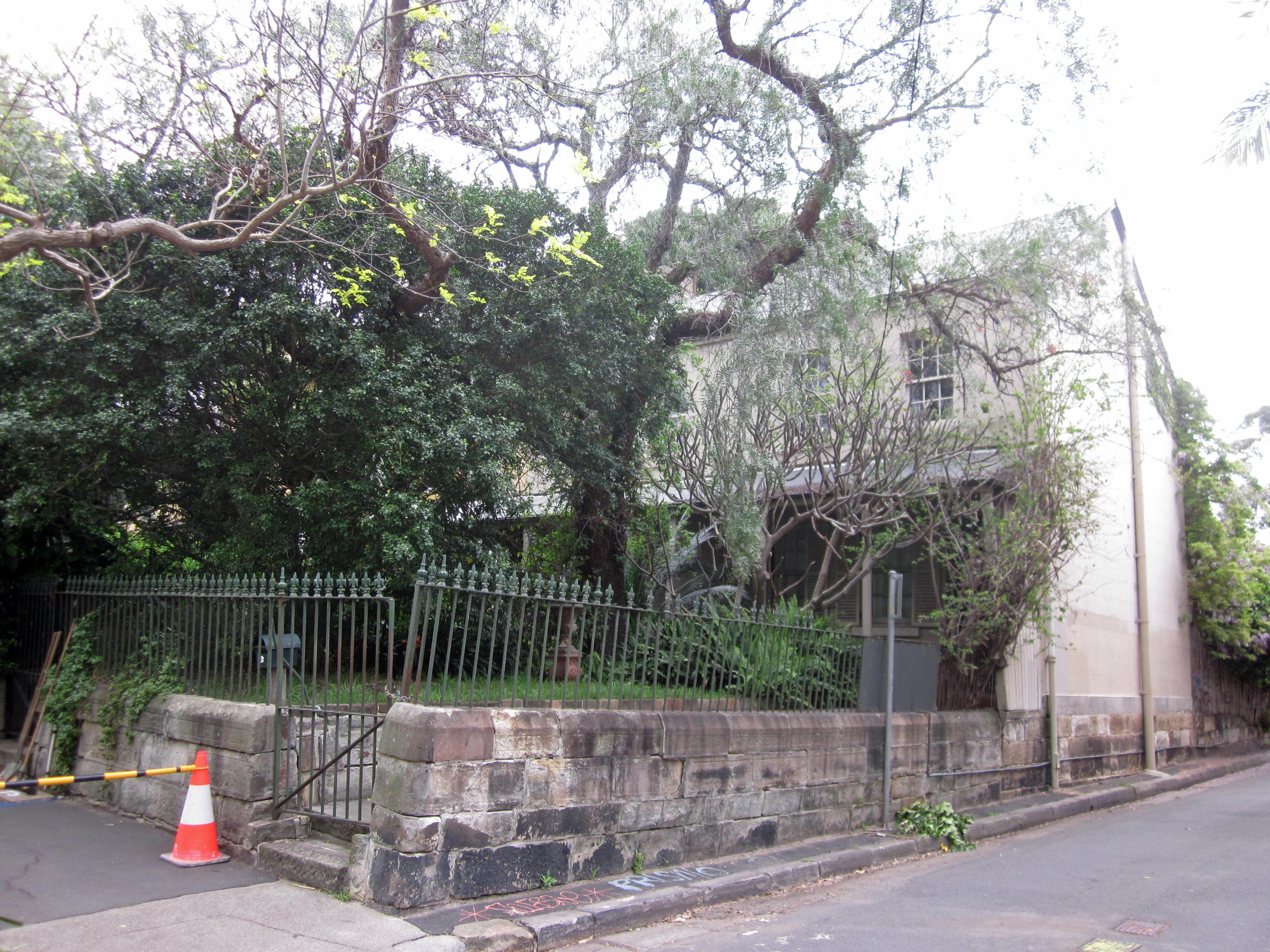
- 6 Pitt Street, part of Fitzroy Terrace, 6–18 Pitt Street, Redfern, New South Wales

- Location within Sydney Location within Australia
- 33°53′25″S 151°12′15″E
- Location: 6–18 Pitt Street, Redfern, City of Sydney, New South Wales, Australia

Site notes
- Architect: James Hume

New South Wales Heritage Register
- Official name: Fitzroy Terrace; Fitzroy Crescant
- Type: State heritage (built)
- Designated: 2 April 1999
- Reference no.: 83
- Type: Terrace
- Category: Residential buildings (private)

Fitzroy Terrace is a heritage-listed residence located at 6–18 Pitt Street in the inner western Sydney suburb of Redfern, New South Wales, Australia. It was designed by James Hume. It is also known as Fitzroy Crescent. The property is privately owned. It was added to the New South Wales State Heritage Register on 2 April 1999.

== History ==
=== History of the suburb of Redfern ===
Redfern's natural landscape was defined by sand hills and swamps. The Carrahdigang, more widely known as the Cadigal people, valued the area for its abundant supply of food.

The name Redfern originates from an early land grant to William Redfern in 1817. It was previously known as Roberts Farm and Boxley's Swamp. William Redfern (1774?–1833) was a surgeon's mate in the Royal Navy and was aboard HMS Standard when its crew took part in the revolt in 1797 known as the Mutiny of the Nore. Because he had advised the men to be more united, he was included among leaders who were court-martialled. Although sentenced to death, he was reprieved because of his youth and in 1801 arrived in Sydney as a convict. He served on Norfolk Island as an assistant surgeon. In 1803 he was pardoned, but remained on the island until 1808, when he returned to Sydney and was appointed assistant surgeon after being examined in medicine and surgery by Surgeons Jamison, Harris and Bohan.

In 1816 he took charge of the new Sydney Hospital, but maintained a private practice. In 1814 he reported on conditions on convict transport ships and his recommendation that all have a surgeon on board whose duties were to superintend the health of convicts was put into practice. He resigned from Government service in 1819 when not appointed to succeed D'Arcy Wentworth as principal surgeon. Despite his valuable service, many were contemptuous of him as he was an emancipist, although he had the friendship of Governor Macquarie. In 1818 Redfern received a grant of 526 hectares (1,300 acres) in Airds (in today's Campbelltown area) and later received more land in the area and by his death in 1823 he owned, by grant and purchase, over 9,308 hectares (23,000 acres) in NSW.

In 1817 he had been granted 40 hectares (100 acres) in the area of the present suburb of Redfern. The boundaries were approximately the present-day Cleveland, Regent, Redfern and Elizabeth Streets. The commodious home Redfern built on his land was considered to be a country house, surrounded by flower and kitchen gardens. His neighbours were John Baptist (at the 16-hectare (40-acre) Darling Nursery in today's Chippendale) and Captain Cleveland, an officer of the 73rd regiment, remembered by today's street of that name, and before its demolition, by Cleveland House, his home.

The passing of the Sydney Slaughterhouses Act in 1849 brought other businesses to the district. This act banned abattoirs and noxious trades from the city. Tanners, wool scourers and wool-washers, fellmongers, boiling down works and abattoirs had 10 years to move their businesses outside city boundaries. Many of the trades moved to Redfern and Waterloo – attracted by the water. The sand hills still existed but by the late 1850s Redfern was a flourishing suburb housing 6,500 people.

The Municipalities Act of 1858 gave districts the option of municipal incorporation. Public meetings were held and after a flurry of petitions Redfern Municipality was proclaimed on 11 August 1859, the fourth in Sydney to be formed under the Act. Redfern Town Hall opened in 1870 and the Albert Cricket Ground in 1864. Redfern Post Office came in 1882.

The majority of houses in Redfern in the 1850s were of timber. From the 1850s market gardeners congregated in Alexandria south of McEvoy Street, around Shea's Creek and Bourke Road.

When Sydney's original railway terminus was built in the Cleveland Paddocks, which extended from Devonshire and Cleveland Streets to Chippendale, the station's name was chosen to honour William Redfern. The station was built of iron and the first stationmaster was a Mr Fielding. In 1874 the station was replaced by a brick and stone structure, covering two platforms. At that time the present Redfern railway station was known as Eveleigh, after a lovely old home standing on the western side of the railway line.

When Central railway station was built, on the site of the Devonshire Street Cemetery, the name of Eveleigh Station was changed to Redfern. The name Eveleigh was retained for the huge railway workshops, just beyond the station, on the site of the original Hutchinson Estate.

All that remains of the Cleveland Paddocks is Prince Alfred Park, where the exhibition building was erected in 1870 for an inter-colonial exhibition opened by Governor Belmore, after whom Belmore Park was named, on 30 August 1870.

Redfern was the scene of the maiden trip of the first double-decker tram in 1879. It travelled between the old Redfern station to the corner of Hunter and Elizabeth Streets in the city.

In 1885 the Sands Sydney Directory listed 54 market gardens. While many were worked by European-Australians, by the 1870s Chinese market gardeners had acquired leases in the district and a decade later were dominating the trade.

The Eveleigh complex in 1886 became one of the largest employers in the state. Redfern was an industrial working class suburb by the end of the 19th century. Reschs brewery and other factories attracted migrants. The Syrian/Lebanese community began settling around Redfern and Surry Hills by the 1880s.

Redfern at the end of the 19th century was characterised by its many gardens, but at the turn of the century industry was taking over the area. At that time, many businessmen in the area were from Syria, such as George Dan, who established his business in 1890; Stanton and Aziz Melick, in 1888; and Anthony & Simon Coorey, in the 1890s. Like other inner-city suburbs, the area still has a high migrant population, including many now from Lebanon, as well as a large Aboriginal population. There is still industry in the area among the high density residential occupation.

In the 1940s 73 per cent of all industrial activity in Sydney was concentrated within a radius of 5.6 kilometres (3.5 mi) from Redfern station.

Many of its services have disappeared or been substantially downgraded over the last couple of decades, even though Redfern is still a densely populated inner city suburb.

=== Fitzroy Terrace ===
"Fitzroy Terrace" stands on part of 12 hectares (30 acres) of land which was first granted by Lieut. Governor Grose to Williams Robert on 8.1.1794, on the condition that he cultivate and improve the land. The land was then sold to John Boxley in 1800 and Thomas Laycock in 1805 for A£70. Mr. Laycock sold it to Mrs. Sarah Wills for A£100 on the same day. Mrs. Wills was later widowed and married George Howe, editor of the Sydney Gazette in 1811. Her eldest daughter married Dr. William Redfern. Dr. Redfern owned an adjoining 28 hectares (70 acres) which he consolidated with his wife's 12 hectares (30 acres) in a new grant issued by Governor Macquarie in 1816.

Redfern was transported to Australia as a mutineer in 1800. He was pardoned in 1803 and rose to have the largest private practice in the colony which included both the Macquaries and the Macarthurs. Although an emancipist he was appointed to the magistracy by Governor Macquarie and was one of the first directors of the Bank of New South Wales. His Sydney estate of 40 hectares (100 acres) gave its name to the suburb of Redfern which developed around it. He was the first person to receive an Australian medical qualification, the first teacher of Australian medical students and the instigator of important reforms on board the convict transports. He returned to Scotland in 1828.

Redfern's grant of 40 hectares (100 acres) was subdivided and advertise for sale in allotments of between 1 and 2 hectares (2 and 5 acres) in 1834. In 1842 the agent for the Redfern estate had the property surveyed and divided into allotments. Lots 10 and 12, Section 2 were sold to Mr. John Alexander who was responsible for developing the land. The Sydney Morning Herald advertised Fitzroy Terrace on 12 August 1846 in the following way:

"TO BE LET". The two storey Houses lately erected in Upper Pitt Street, Redfern contains four good rooms each with detached kitchen, pantry and servant's room. These houses are slated, and are very substantially built. There is a plentiful supply of water and every convenience for a respectable family. Each house has a large backyard and garden ground behind, with ground in front for a flower plot. Rent moderate. Apply to Mr. Alexander, 700 George Street or to Mr. James Hume, 113 King Street."

As Governor Fitzroy arrived in Sydney just after completion of the terrace it was probably named after him, and from the evidence contained in the advertisement, it was the work of James Hume an important architect practising in Sydney in the 1840s.

Hume designed the Presbyterian Church in Wollongong (1839) and Goulburn (1839) and the Sydney Synagogue. He worked on St. Andrew's Cathedral before Edmund Blacket and Burdekin House. He has also been credited with the design of "Lindesay" at Darling Point. Fitzroy Terrace may be the only surviving building by Hume. Fitzroy Terrace incorporates Regency design concepts and is modelled in a unitary fashion. It is a rare example of its kind and of the work of Hume.

The Sands Directory shows the early occupants of Fitzroy Terrace in the 1840s, 1850s and 1860s as belonging to the professional and commercial middle class with occupations listed such as barrister, accountant, clerk, civil engineer.

==== 18 Pitt Street ====
The front garden, with the exception of its framing cast iron picket fence, stone retaining walls and tiled paths and a c. 50-year old frangipani tree, hardly existed 15 years ago, when the subject elm tree, another planting, was installed by the then owners.

The existing garden is generally sympathetic in form and content to the age of the terrace. The owner noted that photographs from 15 years ago showed nothing there then. The owner also noted two old Port Jackson fig trees (Ficus rubiginosa) in the rear garden, which are getting large and causing problems.

== Description ==
Fitzroy Terrace is a colonial Georgian breakfront terrace of seven two-storey houses designed by the architect James Hume in 1846. It is built in stuccoed brick lined out in imitation of ashlar with the central terrace of three stones projecting forward with a gable roof. The gable attic is lit by a semicircular fanlight to the rear and a pivoting sash window to the front.

The verandah to the ground floor is supported on simple timber chamfered posts with wide boarded veranda divisions. Most of the veranda roofs have been reinstated in timber shingles, the main roofs have been partially reinstated in slate the rest being of corrugated iron or terracotta tile. The building is simply detailed with the original six panel sash windows, six panel entrance doors with semi circular fanlights over French doors with margin glazing, opening out to the front garden in the centre terrace only. Internally the two up, two down houses retain their original simple cedar joinery, fireplace surrounds, stairway and panel doors. Original access to the servants room above the kitchen was by way of a trap door.

Externally the houses are set back from Pitt Street, with tiled paths, cast iron picket fences and stone retaining walls. To the rear the separate skillion roofed kitchens have long since been joined to the main buildings by boarded timber links. Above the kitchen is a small storage room lit by a four pane pivoting window. Most houses still retain their out houses fronting the rear lane. Numerous extensions have in the past been made to the rear of the houses. In the case of No. 6 Pitt Street a very unsympathetic extension spoils the harmony of the rear elevation.

=== 18 Pitt Street ===
The front garden, with the exception of its framing cast iron picket fence, stone retaining walls and tiled paths and a c. 50-year-old frangipani tree, hardly existed 15 years ago, when the subject elm tree, another planting, was installed by the then owners.

The existing garden is generally sympathetic in form and content to the age of the terrace. The owner noted that photographs from 15 years ago showed nothing there then. The owner also noted two old Port Jackson fig trees (Ficus rubiginosa) in the rear garden, which are getting large and causing problems.

=== Condition ===
As at 7 February 2002, Fitzroy Terrace have survived due to Redfern's social decline during the early 20th century. The building is in good condition, partially restored with potential for complete restoration.

Terrace No. 16 and No. 18 have been sympathetically restored and the remaining terraces are in reasonable condition. The integrity of the building as a whole may be enhanced by the use of consistent roofing materials and colour schemes.

=== Modifications and dates ===
Separate ownership has resulted in alterations. The terrace was originally painted an ochre colour and the window frames a soft green. The front doors combined these two colours. Shudders were originally fixed to the ground floor windows and were probably painted a dark green. The verandah enclosures have recently been corrected but generally changes have been confined to the rear of the buildings.

In March 2013 at 18 Pitt Street, an elm tree (c. 15 years old) was removed due to poor health.

== Heritage listing ==
As at 6 April 2005, Fitzroy Terrace has historical significance as it stands on part of what was Dr. William Redfern's Estate. The Estate gave its name to the suburb of Redfern which developed around it and Fitzroy Terrace is representative of that development. The building is the work of James Hume an important architect practising in Sydney in the 1840s. Fitzroy Terrace has social and cultural significance as "purposely built" accommodation for the commercial and professional middle classes of the mid 19th century and has research potential for mid 19th century architecture within Australia . It an extremely rare, if not unique example, of its kind and of the work of Hume.

Fitzroy Terrace was listed on the New South Wales State Heritage Register on 2 April 1999 having satisfied the following criteria.

The place is important in demonstrating the course, or pattern, of cultural or natural history in New South Wales.

Fitzroy terrace has historical significance as it is located on part of a 1794 grant of land which was eventually owned by Dr William Redfern after whom the suburb was named. Fitzroy Terrace was named after Governor Fitzroy and is what remains of that early development.

The place has a strong or special association with a person, or group of persons, of importance of cultural or natural history of New South Wales's history.

Fitzroy Terrace has direct association with architect James Hume and is located on Dr Redferns original land grant after whom the suburb was named. Fitzroy Terrace was named after Governor Fitzroy who visited Sydney shortly after the buildings completion however it is not known if this was to coincide with Fitzroy's visit.

The place is important in demonstrating aesthetic characteristics and/or a high degree of creative or technical achievement in New South Wales.

Fitzroy Terrace is aesthetically significant as it remains in an area of Redfern which retains its varied 19th century streetscape.

The place has a strong or special association with a particular community or cultural group in New South Wales for social, cultural or spiritual reasons.

Fitzroy Terrace has social and cultural significance as it was built for the commercial and professional middle classes of the mid 19th century. During the 1850s, Redfern and particularly Pitt Street was a select address

The place has potential to yield information that will contribute to an understanding of the cultural or natural history of New South Wales.

Fitzroy Terrace has research potential for mid 19th century architecture within Australia and for the architectural works of James Hume.

The place possesses uncommon, rare or endangered aspects of the cultural or natural history of New South Wales.

Fitzroy Terrace is a rare example of colonial Georgian breakfront terrace of seven two storey houses designed by the architect James Hume in 1846

The place is important in demonstrating the principal characteristics of a class of cultural or natural places/environments in New South Wales.

Fitzroy Terrace is representative of Georgian houses designed by the architect James Hume and of early urban development aimed at a distinctive social class of person.

== See also ==
- Australian residential architectural styles
- Jobbins Terrace
