= 113–115 Gloucester Street, The Rocks =

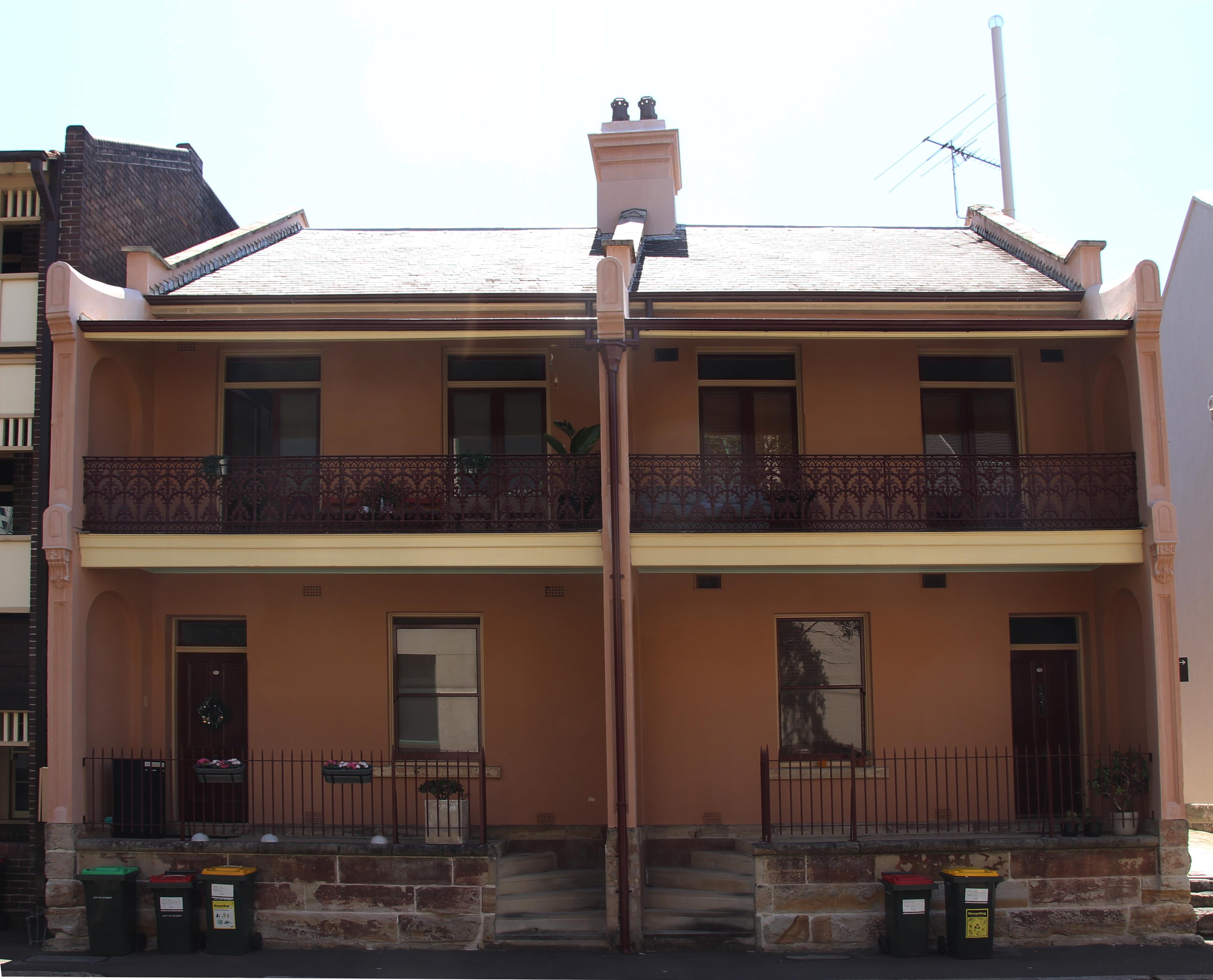
- 113–115 Gloucester Street, pictured in 2019. Long's Lane is located to the right of 113 Gloucester Street, at right of image.

- Location within Sydney Location within Australia
- 33.8607°S 151.2070°E
- Location: 113–115 Gloucester Street, The Rocks, City of Sydney, New South Wales, Australia

History
- Built: 1881

Site notes
- Owner: Property NSW

New South Wales Heritage Register
- Official name: Terrace; Longs Lane Terraces/Precinct
- Type: State heritage (built)
- Designated: 10 May 2002
- Reference no.: 1601
- Type: Terrace
- Category: Residential buildings (private)

113–115 Gloucester Street, The Rocks is a heritage-listed terrace house located in the Long's Lane Precinct at 113–115 Gloucester Street, in the inner city Sydney suburb of The Rocks in the City of Sydney local government area of New South Wales, Australia. It was built during 1881. It is also known as Longs Lane Terraces/Precinct. The property is owned by Property NSW, an agency of the Government of New South Wales. It was added to the New South Wales State Heritage Register on 10 May 2002.

== History ==
In 1807, this site is shown by Meehan's Survey to contain a defined building alignment with a lane on the northern boundary. Artists' views of the western side of Sydney Cove between 1800–1820 confirm a large number of small buildings in the region. By 1822 the site appears on Harper's Survey as containing a single relatively small structure. Robert Russell's Survey in 1838 shows the site as the eastern half of Allotment 18 of Section 74 which was granted to William Long by Governor George Gipps in 1839. In 1829, prior to the formalising of the land claim, Long had acquired the eastern section of the property fronting Gloucester Street.

A former convict, Long arrived in Sydney aboard the Baring in 1815, but by 1829 was a successful wine and spirits merchant as well as being licensee of pubs in Millers Point and Lower George Street. Long assumed ownership of the western section of allotment 18 fronting Cumberland St after the death of his wife Mary Walker. Prior to her death, Mary Long had inherited the property from her former husband, Richard Walker, in 1825. Maps of the area drawn in 1823 and 1825 show only one building on the site, but by 1831another building had been erected on the corner of Gloucester St and Long's Lane. This building was probably erected during the course of 1830, although the intended use of the building is unclear. In 1845, when the City Council assessed the site, it was described as containing a small tenement of three houses each of two rooms with shingled roofs. The "date of taking" this assessment is noted as 1842 and in 1848 they are described as "bad repair". By 1848 a trio of single-storey, shingle-roofed houses, with two rooms each had been built.

Around 1881–1882, the three houses, by now in "bad repair", were demolished, making way for a pair of two storey-terrace houses, with five rooms each (later expanded to six rooms), and slate roofing. These are the houses that remain on the site today. In addition to the main houses, the rear of the lots contained outbuildings, rear wings and rear yards which extended into land formerly occupied by the demolished Long's Lane tenements, which were last listed in the rate books for 1877. The site continued to be the property of William Long (later part of his estate) until the NSW Government resumed the site in 1900.

The houses were always tenanted. One notable tenant of No. 113 was Joseph Law, also known as [Joseph] Ah Chong, a Chinese interpreter reportedly working for the government. Law occupied the house from 1885 to 1902, with his wife, Margaret Gratrix, with whom he had up to 18 children.

The 1902 Sands Directory was the last mention of Law as the tenant in the house. The following year his wife Margaret was listed as the tenant. Following the outbreak of bubonic plague in Sydney and The Rocks, the NSW Government, under The Rocks Resumption Act 1901 resumed the area. Local people worked at the task of cleansing, disinfecting, fumigating and lime-washing buildings. Although The Rocks area became synonymous with the plague, only three of the 103 people who died of the plague in Sydney were from The Rocks. Between 1905 and 1915, the buildings on the "Dig" site were demolished and, in the 1920s, major demolition's took place nearby for the Sydney Harbour Bridge approach. In the 1950s, several houses to the south of Long's Lane were demolished when the Cahill Expressway was constructed.

Under state ownership the houses continued to be leased to various tenants until the mid-1980s. About this time the rear wings and outbuildings were demolished, and the buildings boarded up. The buildings were occupied by squatters, and vandalised during this period, falling into a ruinous state by the 1990s, when renovation work commenced.

Over 1994 and 1995, an extensive programme of conservation works were carried out on the building. The work comprised stabilisation, restoration of the front façade and roofs, cutting in damp proof courses, and construction of new floors. Joinery, plastering, and other surface finishes were reconstructed on the basis of surviving original fabric. Rear wings were constructed on the extant footings of the earlier rear wings; however, only the external form of the original rear wings was reconstructed, allowing the interiors to be adapted for modern kitchens and bathrooms. The houses are now privately leased to tenants.

The Sydney Cove Authority also carried out conservation works to the buildings and rear yards in the remainder of the Long's Lane Precinct, including 103-111 Gloucester Street, 117 Gloucester Street, and 130-142 Cumberland Street. This work was awarded the 1998 Lloyd Rees Award for Outstanding Urban Design.

Archaeology notes: Lease to Samuel Thorley, 8 June 1803 (land later granted as Lot 21, Section 74). Granted as part of Section 74: Lot 18 to William Long, 22 June 1839; Lot 19 to William Butt, Cumberland Street, 19 April 1839; Lot 20 to J. T. Hughes, 30 September 1839; Lot 21 to J. T. Hughes, on 19 April 1839.

== Description ==
113–115 Gloucester Street is a part of a cluster of nineteenth and early-twentieth houses, rear yards, and laneways between Gloucester and Cumberland Streets, The Rocks. 113–115 Gloucester Street is a typical Victorian terrace of the 1880s prevalent throughout the inner suburbs of Sydney. The dominant feature of the terrace is the large verandah space onto Gloucester Street. While interior planning of the terrace is basically two rooms down and up with rear service wings, an unusual feature is the strict alignment of the building to the land title allotment. A consequence of this is that many of the walls do not meet at ninety degrees.

Style: Late Victorian terrace; Storeys: 2; Roof Cladding: Originally slate.

=== Condition ===
As at 3 May 2001, Archaeology Assessment Condition: Partly disturbed. Assessment Basis: Archaeological excavation (1994) involved the removal of occupation deposits from the kitchens of 113–115, dating from 1881 to c. 1930s. Deposits in the rest of the properties were untouched with the exception of 300x300 excavations in the centres of each of the four main ground floor rooms in 113–115 for the construction of floor supports. All services were surface mounted beneath floor joists to avoid disturbance of potential archaeological remains. An existing service trench in 117 was re-excavated and utilised for the same purpose. Pre 1912 deposits in 117 untouched. Investigation: Historical research and assessment of archaeology.

=== Modifications and dates ===
- 1989 – Rear wings and outbuildings demolished.
- 1920s – Replacement of doors, windows etc. and probable installation of electrical services.
- 1992–97 – Conservation and restoration of the Long's Lane precinct.

== Heritage listing ==
As at 31 March 2011, this pair of terraces and site are of State heritage significance for their historical and scientific cultural values. The site and building are also of State heritage significance for their contribution to The Rocks area which is of State Heritage significance in its own right.

The pair of houses at 113–115 Gloucester Street and site are of historical, aesthetic, and scientific significance to the people of New South Wales for its contribution to the Longs Lane precinct which is significant in demonstrating the evolution of The Rocks in the 19th and early 20th centuries, and which remains a rare townscape complete with laneways and rear yards intact.

The terrace has aesthetic significance as a typical example of the form of housing prevalent in the inner suburbs of Sydney in the 1880s, 113–115 Gloucester Street possesses the ability to interpret their original appearance and configuration as a result of extensive conservation works undertaken by the State government in the 1990s.

Occupied by numerous tenants throughout its history, No. 113 has been identified as a site of heritage significance as the home of a Chinese interpreter, Joseph Law, between 1885 and 1902. The Longs Lane precinct is primarily significant as a unique ensemble of nineteenth century residential buildings, laneways and rear yards in The Rocks, and because it includes the terrace, 103–111 Gloucester Street, which is a very rare extant example in Sydney of an early Victorian Greek Revival style terrace of houses created as total composition.

Longs Lane precinct is also significant because it is indicative of the nineteenth and early-twentieth century residential character of The Rocks, retaining strong associational and geographic links with community services such as shops, and churches. It retains rare examples of early-nineteenth century public laneways in their original scale and orientation. It is a unique ensemble in the Rocks of tenanted residential buildings of varying nineteenth and early twentieth century architectural periods including the Early Victorian, Victorian, and Edwardian. It possesses a unique archaeological potential as a discrete cluster of buildings, laneways, and rear yards of various buildings, relatively undisturbed since 1915, dating from the earliest period of occupation in Sydney. Longs Lane is a rare extant public right of way known to have existed from the first decade of the nineteenth century. Carahers Lane is a rare documented site where the existence of slum housing from the-mid to late-nineteenth century can be shown to be associated with the remaining physical fabric, and historical documentation about the landlords/owners.

113–115 Gloucester Street are typical of 1880s terraces in inner Sydney. 113 Gloucester St holds significance as associated with the household of the Law family from c. 1882–1903, Joseph Law was a Chinese Interpreter and government translator. The site holds significance for its importance to the history of Chinese in Australia and attempts to negotiate between two very different cultures

Terrace was listed on the New South Wales State Heritage Register on 10 May 2002 having satisfied the following criteria.

The place is important in demonstrating the course, or pattern, of cultural or natural history in New South Wales.

The site of 113–115 Gloucester Street is historically significant as a site continuously occupied since the 1820s. 113-115 Gloucester Street is historically significant as a key component in demonstrating the evolution of the Long's Lane precinct, which is a unique ensemble in The Rocks of 19th century residential buildings, laneways, and rear yards. 113–115 Gloucester Street is of historical significance in its own right as a reflection of the 1880s speculative development of The Rocks, during a period of intense redevelopment of the area as a result of the economic boom years of the latter 19th century. The history of 113–115 Gloucester Street's decline into dereliction, and the occupation of the building by squatters prior to the conservation works of the early 1990s reflects the changing social context of The Rocks from the late 19th century to the present. The decision of the State government to restore the building for residential (rather than commercial) purposes demonstrates the prevailing political will and public funding dedicated to the conservation of heritage in the post-Green Bans period in The Rocks. 113–115 Gloucester Street meets this criterion on a State level.

The place has a strong or special association with a person, or group of persons, of importance of cultural or natural history of New South Wales's history.

113–115 Gloucester Street is historically associated with the William Long and his descendants, as well as the numerous individuals and families who occupied the houses over time, including Joseph Law, a Chinese interpreter who occupied No. 113 between 1885 and 1902. 113–115 Gloucester Street meets this criterion on a local level.

The place is important in demonstrating aesthetic characteristics and/or a high degree of creative or technical achievement in New South Wales.

113–115 Gloucester Street is of some aesthetic significance locally as an example a typical Victorian terrace of the 1880s. The aesthetic significance of the building has been revealed and can now be better understood through reconstruction and conservation. 113–115 Gloucester Street makes a substantial contribution to the streetscape significance of The Rocks, particularly complementing the terraced character of the eastern side of Gloucester Street (including the Jobbins Terrace at 103–111 Gloucester Street, the Edwardian Cottages at 46–56 Gloucester Street, Susannah Place at 58–64 Gloucester Street, and Baker's Terrace at 66–72 Gloucester Street). 113–115 Gloucester Street makes a substantial contribution to the aesthetic significance of the Long's Lane Precinct as an ensemble of 19th and early 20th century buildings, associated laneways, and rear yards. 113–115 Gloucester Street meets this criterion on a State level.

The place has a strong or special association with a particular community or cultural group in New South Wales for social, cultural or spiritual reasons.

As part of The Rocks area, 113–115 Gloucester Street is likely to be held in some esteem by the individuals and groups who are interested in Sydney's history and heritage. No. 113 Gloucester Street has been identified by the Chinese Australian Cultural Heritage Group as a site which is of significance to the history of the Chinese community in NSW. No. 113 Gloucester Street meets this criterion on a local level.

The place has potential to yield information that will contribute to an understanding of the cultural or natural history of New South Wales.

The archaeological resource at 113–115 Gloucester Street is of research significance as a rare example of a site yielding archaeological evidence of the pre-1830 period of European settlement in Sydney. The results of previous archaeological investigations of the site and those adjacent to it are fully documented and form, together with other projects carried out in the area, a valuable resource for understanding early life in The Rocks area. 113–115 Gloucester Street is of some technical significance as an example of "academic" conservation work in which reconstructed fabric was strictly based on extant material and constructed in a traditional manner. 113–115 Gloucester Street meets this criterion on a local level.

The place possesses uncommon, rare or endangered aspects of the cultural or natural history of New South Wales.

113–115 Gloucester Streets does not, itself, possess any rare or uncommon aspects of significance. The Long's Lane Precinct is of significance as an ensemble of 19th and early 20th century buildings, associated laneways, and rear yards which is rare (probably unique) in the Sydney region and NSW. 113–115 Gloucester Street does not meet this criterion on a local or State level. The Long's Lane precinct meets this criterion on a State level.

The place is important in demonstrating the principal characteristics of a class of cultural or natural places/environments in New South Wales.

113–115 Gloucester Street is a good representative example of 1880s terrace housing within the context of the Long's Lane precinct, itself a significant area in demonstrating the 19th century townscape of The Rocks, complete with intact rear yards and laneways. 113–115 Gloucester Street meets this criterion on a local level. The Long's Lane precinct meets this criterion on a State level.

== See also ==
- Australian residential architectural styles
- Jobbins Terrace, 103–111 Gloucester Street
- 117–117a Gloucester Street
