= Jobbins Terrace =

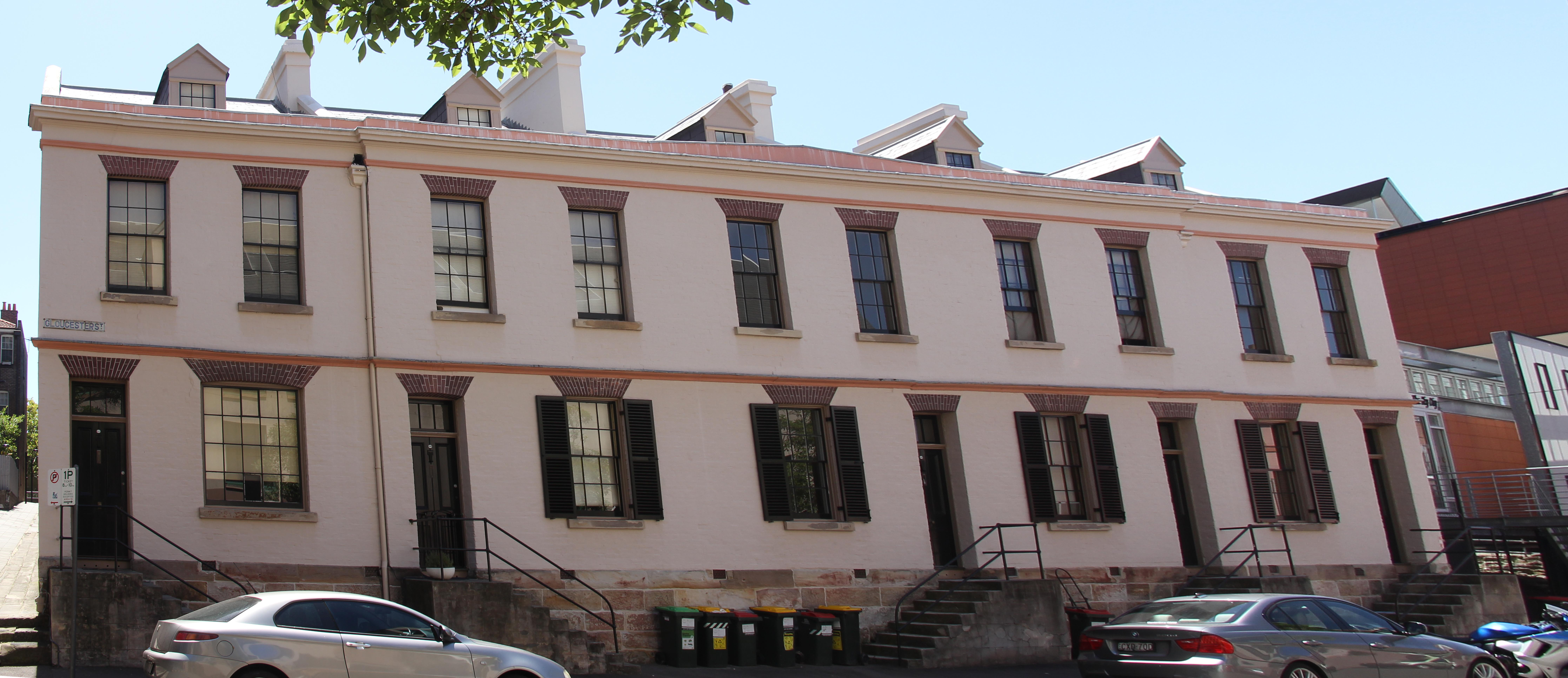
- Jobbins Terrace, with part of Long's Lane at left, pictured in 2019.

- Location within Sydney Location within Australia
- 33.8606°S 151.2070°E
- Location: 103–111 Gloucester Street, The Rocks, City of Sydney, New South Wales, Australia

History
- Built: 1855–1857

Site notes
- Architectural style: Mid-Victorian
- Owner: Property NSW

New South Wales Heritage Register
- Official name: Jobbins Terrace; Longs Lane Terraces/Precinct (Jobbin's; Long's )
- Type: State heritage (built)
- Designated: 10 May 2002
- Reference no.: 1553
- Type: Terrace
- Category: Residential buildings (private)

Jobbins Terrace is a series of heritage-listed terrace houses now repurposed as residences and offices located at 103–111 Gloucester Street, in the inner city Sydney suburb of The Rocks in the City of Sydney local government area of New South Wales, Australia. It was built from 1855 to 1857. It is also known as Longs Lane Terraces/Precinct (Jobbin's and Long's). The property is owned by Property NSW, an agency of the Government of New South Wales. It was added to the New South Wales State Heritage Register on 10 May 2002.

== History ==
In 1807, this site is shown by Meehan's survey to contain a defined building alignment with a lane on the southern boundary. Artists' representations of the area from as early as 1803 up until c. 1815 show close settlement. Maps made in 1823, 1825, 1831, and 1842 show that the present site of the Jobbins Building was occupied by a row of small buildings, set well back from the current alignment of Gloucester Street. The alignment of Long's Lane was already established by the time the earliest of these maps (by Hoddle, 1823) was made. The row of houses fronting Gloucester Street is described in the Council rate assessment book of 1845 as a group of five wooden buildings with shingle roofs, all single storey with two rooms each, in "bad repair." By the time of the next rate assessment, in 1848, one of the buildings had fallen down. The remainder of this group was demolished by 1850, when Wells' map shows a single structure at the corner of Gloucester Street and Long's Lane, on a large block of vacant land. The 1852 rate assessment indicated that the only improvement to the allotment was a timber stable with shingle roof.

From 1839, the subject land, described as Allotment 1, Section 74 of the City of Sydney, was owned by John Jobbins, a convict transported for seven years arriving on the Fanny I in 1816. In 1822, at the expiry of his seven-year sentence, he was listed in the Colonial Secretary's papers as receiving an assigned convict. The 1828 Census lists him as a butcher in Cambridge Street. From 1836 Jobbins settled in the Gundaroo district as a grazier, and built the Nanima homestead in 1839. Jobbins owned the land at Gloucester Street until his death at Prahran, Victoria, on 8 January 1855.

In December 1840 Jobbins leased the site, together with a neighbouring allotment across Caraher's Lane, to Edward Flood for a period of 20 years, at an annual rent of £50. It appears that the five timber dwellings in "bad repair" were therefore under the management of Flood, who was perhaps also responsible for erecting the stable on the site by 1850. Shortly after John Jobbins' death in 1855, the executors of his estate oversaw construction of the terrace as an investment. The building was complete by 1858, when Council rate assessment books describe a group of brick terraces with slate roofs, of two floors and seven rooms each. An 1865 MWSDB map shows the earliest form of the buildings: 105 to 111 Gloucester Street with rear wings, 103 to 109 Gloucester Street with rear WC's, and 111 with a rear outbuilding.

The houses have always been leased to tenants, with each tenant generally only staying a few years. Longer-term tenants of note include Anne Lewis, who ran a boarding house at No. 111 between 1861 and 1873; and Sydney Smith, a cab proprietor who occupied 111 Gloucester Street between 1882 and 1897 (making use of the gable-ended outbuilding at the rear of the building). From 1912 until at least the cessation of the Sands Directory in 1933, a grocer's shop occupied the ground floor of No. 111.

The property remained in the hands of the Jobbins family and was managed by a series of agents, whose names are recorded in the Council rate assessment books. In 1864, the property was conveyed to Edward Jobbins of Yass, brother of John Jobbins, in accordance with John Jobbins' will. In 1870, Edward Jobbins made a Deed of Gift of three of the houses in the terrace (Nos. 107–111) to his daughter Mary Ann (a spinster of Gundaroo), and the remaining two (Nos. 103–105) to his son Peter (farmer of Gundaroo). In this deed the houses are referred to as 'commonly called or known as Jobbins Buildings.' About 1874, Peter agreed to convey his two houses to Mary Ann, however, this conveyance was not registered until 1889. Mary Ann held the land until her death on 6 April 1899. In 1902, the NSW Government resumed the land.

The building continued to be tenanted until the 1960s and 1970s. The last house was vacated in the 1980s, the rear wings demolished, and the houses boarded up. Subsequently, squatters occupied the houses. Much of the joinery and many fixtures were stolen or demolished during the period of squatting. Between 1991 and 1993, an extensive programme of conservation works were carried out on the building. The work comprised stabilisation, restoration of the front façade and roofs, cutting in damp proof courses, and construction of new floors. Joinery, plastering, and other surface finishes were reconstructed on the basis of surviving original fabric. Rear wings were constructed on the extant footings of the earlier rear wings; however, only the external form of the original rear wings was reconstructed, allowing the interiors to be adapted for modern kitchens and bathrooms. The houses are now privately leased to tenants.

The Sydney Cove Authority also carried out conservation works to the buildings and rear yards in the remainder of the Long's Lane Precinct, including 113–117 Gloucester Street and 130–142 Cumberland Street. This work was awarded the Australian Institute of Architects 1998 Lloyd Rees Award for Outstanding Urban Design.

== Description ==
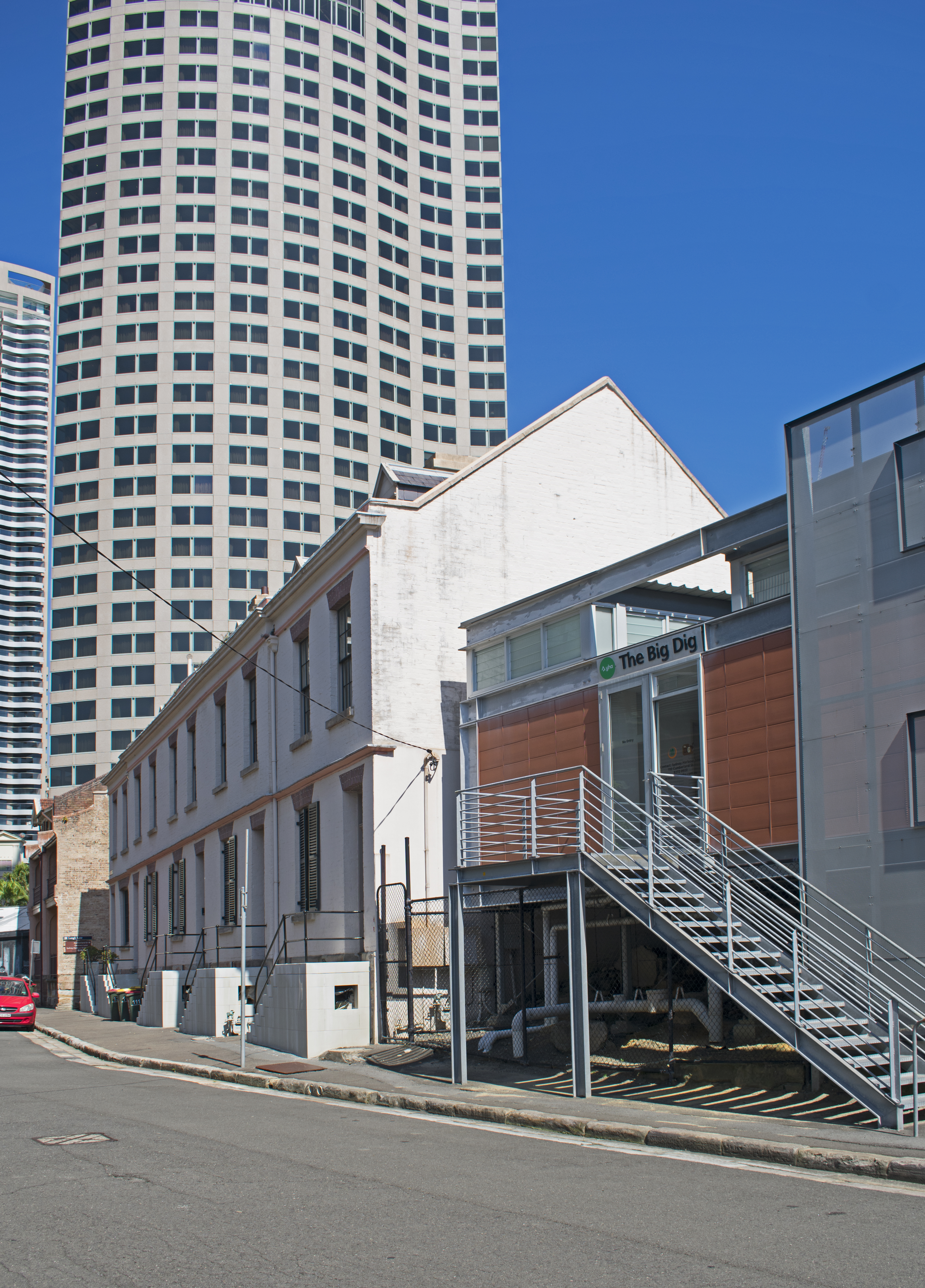
Jobbins Terrace seen from the northeast

103–111 Gloucester Street is a part of the 'Long's Lane Precinct'. Long's Lane is a cluster of nineteenth and early-twentieth houses, rear yards, and laneways between Gloucester and Cumberland Streets, in The Rocks. 103–111 Gloucester Street is a very fine example of a Greek Revival terrace row. While relatively common in Sydney in mid-nineteenth century, extant examples of this style in Sydney are now very rare: Fitzroy Terrace, Redfern is the only other example known. The planning of the terrace emphasises the street façade incorporating a "break front", a diminished central pediment, and raised entrance stairs originally with an awning. The interior planning of the building is essentially "Two down - two up" with an attic space and rear wings. This is the most accomplished building in the precinct.

The fabric of the buildings has remained essentially unchanged: iron roofs were installed c. 1899 and the rear of 105 and 111 Gloucester Street has incorporated additional outbuildings. The houses appear to have been renovated in the 1920s with the replacement of doors, windows, etc., and probable installation of electrical services.

Archaeology notes: Interiors completely reconstructed 1991–1992. No interior archaeological resource remains; Built By: 1790s.

=== Condition ===
As at 27 April 2001, Archaeology Assessment Condition: Rear yards mostly excavated, some pre 1850s deposits still extant. Assessment Basis: Excavation of site 1991–1992. Investigation: Full archaeological excavation. Rear yards mostly excavated, some pre 1850s deposits still extant.

=== Modifications and dates ===
- c. 1899 – Iron roofs installed, and additional outbuildings constructed at the rear of Nos. 105 & 111.
- 1920s – Probable installation of electrical services.
- 1992–1997 – Conservation and restoration of the Long's Lane precinct.

== Heritage listing ==
As at 26 June 2002, Jobbins Terrace and site are of State heritage significance for their historical and scientific cultural values. The site and building are also of State heritage significance for their contribution to The Rocks area which is of State Heritage significance in its own right.

The Jobbins building and site are of historical, aesthetic, and scientific significance to the people of New South Wales for its ability to demonstrate the planning and design of residential accommodation in the Mid-Victorian period, and, as part of the Long's Lane precinct, in demonstrating the evolution of The Rocks in the 19th and early 20th centuries in an intact townscape context complete with laneways and rear yards intact.

The Jobbins Building is of outstanding significance as a rare and very fine example of a Greek Revival breakfront terrace, one of only two known examples to survive in Sydney (and probably NSW) of what was, in the 19th century, a very common building style. The subject of extensive conservation works and archaeological investigation in the 1990s, the Jobbins Building is of State significance for its ability to demonstrate domestic life in The Rocks from pre-1830 to the present; particularly as the archaeological excavation has contributed materially to the understanding of the preferences and lifestyles of the occupants of the terrace over time

Jobbins Terrace was listed on the New South Wales State Heritage Register on 10 May 2002 having satisfied the following criteria.

The place is important in demonstrating the course, or pattern, of cultural or natural history in New South Wales.

The site of the Jobbins Building is historically significant as a site continuously occupied since at least the first decade of the 19th century. The Jobbins Building is historically significant as a key component in demonstrating the evolution of the Long's Lane precinct, which is a unique ensemble in The Rocks of 19th-century residential buildings, laneways, and rear yards. The Jobbins Building is of historical significance in its own right for the state of NSW as a reflection of the 1850s speculative development of The Rocks, and in documenting the spatial planning and quality of residential accommodation intended for occupation by the educated or professional classes in the mid-Victorian period.

The history of the Jobbins Building's decline into dereliction, and the occupation of the building by squatters prior to the conservation works of the early 1990s reflects the changing social context of The Rocks from the late 19th century to the present. The decision of the State government to restore the building for residential (rather than commercial) purposes demonstrates a prevailing political will and public funding dedicated to the conservation of heritage in the post-Green Bans period in The Rocks. The Jobbins Building meets this criterion on a State level.

The place has a strong or special association with a person, or group of persons, of importance of cultural or natural history of New South Wales's history.

The Jobbins Building is historically associated with John Jobbins and his descendants, as well as the numerous individuals and families who occupied the houses over time. However, it was a speculative development undertaken by the executors of Jobbins' estate, and one of a number of such investments.

The place is important in demonstrating aesthetic characteristics and/or a high degree of creative or technical achievement in New South Wales.

The Jobbins Building is aesthetically significant as a very fine example of a Greek Revival terrace row in NSW. The aesthetic significance of the building has been revealed and can now be better understood through reconstruction and conservation. The Jobbins Building makes a substantial contribution to the streetscape significance of The Rocks, particularly complementing the terraced character of the eastern side of Gloucester Street (including the Edwardian Cottages at 46-56 Gloucester Street, Susannah Place at 58-64 Gloucester Street, and Baker's Terrace at 66-72 Gloucester Street). The Jobbins Building makes a substantial contribution to the aesthetic significance of the Long's Lane Precinct as an ensemble of 19th- and early 20th-century buildings, associated laneways, and rear yards. The Jobbins Building meets this criterion on a State level.

The place has a strong or special association with a particular community or cultural group in New South Wales for social, cultural or spiritual reasons.

As part of The Rocks area, the Jobbins Building is held in some esteem by the individuals and groups who are interested in Sydney's history and heritage. This is evidenced by the listing of the building on registers such as the National Trust of Australia and the (now defunct) Register of the National Estate.

The place has potential to yield information that will contribute to an understanding of the cultural or natural history of New South Wales.

The Jobbins Building site is of research significance as a rare example of a site yielding archaeological evidence of the pre-1830 period of European settlement in Sydney. The results of previous archaeological investigations of the site are fully documented and form, together with other projects carried out in the area, a valuable resource for understanding early life in The Rocks area. Further, the original design and planning of the Jobbins Building is intact and can provide a resource for the understanding of 19th-century domestic life, room uses, and spatial planning.

The Jobbins Building is of some technical significance as an example of "academic" conservation work in which reconstructed fabric was strictly based on extant material and constructed in a traditional manner. The Jobbins Building meets this criterion on a State level.

The place possesses uncommon, rare or endangered aspects of the cultural or natural history of New South Wales.

The Jobbins Buildings is a very fine example of terrace housing built in the Greek Revival style featuring a breakfront and diminished central pediment. Although once common in Sydney, it is now one of only two known examples of the style and is considered to be rare in NSW. The Jobbins Building meets this criterion on a State level.

The place is important in demonstrating the principal characteristics of a class of cultural or natural places/environments in New South Wales.

The Jobbins Building is a good representative example of 1850s housing within the context of the Long's Lane precinct, itself a significant area in demonstrating the 19th-century townscape of The Rocks, complete with intact rear yards and laneways. The Jobbins Building is one of a small group of mid-19th-century terraces extant in Sydney. Although it is an example of this period, it is of a higher architectural order than the surviving examples, and therefore is not considered to be particularly representative of the entire group. The Jobbins Building meets this criterion on a State level.

== See also ==
- Australian residential architectural styles
- Fitzroy Terrace, Redfern
- Cumberland Street Archaeological Site and YHA Sydney
- Long's Lane Precinct
- 113–115 Gloucester Street
