= 46–56 Gloucester Street, The Rocks =

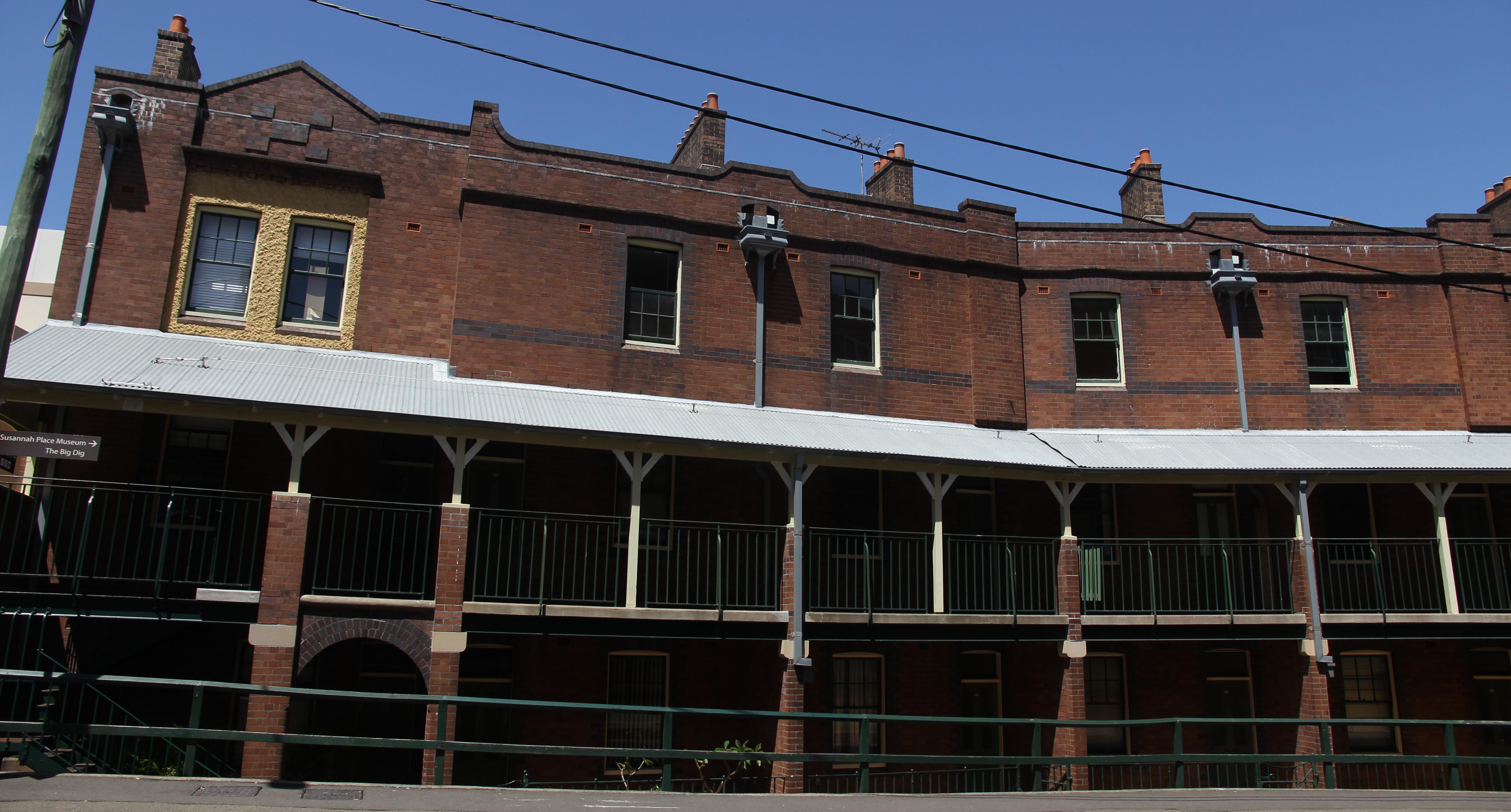
- 46–56 Gloucester Street, pictured in 2019

- Location within Sydney Location within Australia
- 33.8598°S 151.2074°E
- Location: 46–56 Gloucester Street, The Rocks, City of Sydney, New South Wales, Australia

History
- Built: 1914

Site notes
- Owner: Privately owned and Property NSW

New South Wales Heritage Register
- Official name: Terraces; Edwardian Cottages
- Type: State heritage (built)
- Designated: 10 May 2002
- Reference no.: 1609
- Type: Terrace
- Category: Residential buildings (private)

46–56 Gloucester Street, The Rocks is a heritage-listed residence located at 46–56 Gloucester Street, in the inner city Sydney suburb of The Rocks in the City of Sydney local government area of New South Wales, Australia. It was built during 1914. It is also known as Edwardian Cottages. The property is partially privately owned, with the residue owned by Property NSW, an agency of the Government of New South Wales. It was added to the New South Wales State Heritage Register on 10 May 2002.

== History ==
The site now occupied by the Terraces was part of Section 76 of the Parish of St Philip and appears to have been granted and claimed by at least four parties during the 1830s. The northernmost portion, Allotment 4, was claimed by G. Gibbs (date unknown). The adjacent lot, Allotment 3 was granted William Long in June 1839. Allotment 2 was granted to Jane Farrell in May 1836 and Allotment 11, the southernmost portion, was granted to Mary Lupton in April 1839.

Primary Applications relating to part of Allotments 2 and 3 shows that the sites were both conveyed in the 1860s and consolidated by William and John Smith, Customs House Agents, during the 1870s.

The 1865 Trigonometrical Survey of Sydney indicates that part of this land had been developed by this time. A number of buildings are shown in the middle and northern sections of the site which also appears to be broken up into small allotments facing Cambridge Street. The southern portion is vacant. The four terraces, now known as Susannah Place are also shown, numbered Nos. 64–70.

A plan of Lot 11, which also shows Lot 2 and part of Lot 3 dated 1863 notes that W. Smith was the owner and occupier of an L-shaped structure on Lot 2. W. Smith is also noted as the owner of the adjacent property to the north, occupied by Burne. In the same year John Stone Lord purchased a rectangular shaped parcel of land, part of Lot 11, extending between Cambridge and Gloucester Sts, with just over 22 feet frontage to each. The parcel of land illustrated on the title, and southernmost section of the subject site, is occupied by a rectangular structure constructed to the party wall of what is now known as Susannah Place. A note on the drawing indicates that Mrs Riley owned/ occupied the site to the immediate south and W Smith the land to the immediate north. The title shows that this parcel was transferred again in 1876 and 1893.

In May 1873, the northern part of Lot 11 was purchased by John Bros and George Wall, also Customs House Agents, from William Smith. The L-shaped parcel featured just over 22 feet frontage to Cambridge St and just over 52 feet frontage to Gloucester St and wrapped around land and buildings owned by William Smith. This land was subsequently transferred to John Smith in 1890.

The building outlines are also clear on the c. 1880 Percy H. Dove map of the area and highlights the fact that the earlier buildings on the site faced Cambridge St and the harbour. Two single storey structures are shown on the northern portion of the site. The structures are set back from the Cambridge St boundary with smaller structures and yard area behind in the western portion of the allotments, fronting Gloucester St. A two-storey structure is shown on the middle section of the site with shed, yard and what is assumed privy behind, extending to the Gloucester St boundary. A passage separates the building from an L-shaped, single storey structure constructed to the Cambridge St boundary with yard extending to the Gloucester St frontage. The adjacent allotment also features a smaller structure abutting the L-shaped between and open area noted as garden. The four terraces (Susannah Place) to the immediate south of the site are also shown, numbered Nos. 38–44. The southern allotment, adjacent to these terraces is now labelled vacant land.

A Sydney Water survey plan dated 1887 amended in 1895 shows the land occupied by several substantial buildings, all appearing to face Cambridge St. The northern portion of the site is occupied by a large stone, L-shaped structure with two small brick outbuildings, one constructed to the Cambridge St boundary line. A regular shaped stone building is also shown in the next allotment to the south, however, this has been struck out, possibly indicating that it had been demolished by the time the plan was amended in 1895. Another L-shaped, brick-and-stone building noted as Tyrone Cottage occupies the adjacent lot. The building which was present on the earlier plans clearly faces Cambridge St with open land around. The southernmost portion of the site, adjacent to Susannah Place, is shown vacant at this time. The plan also indicates that the street numbering altered to the present numbers, in the period between 1887 and 1895.

The various parcels of land that make up the subject site continued to be transferred and sold. Purchasers predominantly worked in the area. In December 1896 John Smith and James Augustus Adrian, both Customs House Agents, acquired part of Allotment 3. At the same time, John Smith also acquired part of Allotment 2. In July 1897 Smith also purchased part of Allotment 2 with over 29 feet frontage to Cambridge St. In the same year Smith and Adrian consolidated all of Allotment 3 granted to William Long on 22 June 1839 and part of Allotment 2 originally granted to Jane Farrell in May 1836. The site featured just over 19 feet frontage to Gloucester St and nearly 29 feet frontage to Cambridge St.

In 1901 the entire site was resumed and vested with the Minister for Public Works. The cleansing operations in the area included the photographing and recording of buildings to be demolished. A set of photographs, dated 1901 show buildings occupying the site at this time, including Tyrone Cottage. A photograph looking south west along Cambridge St shows the building that occupied the northern section of the site at this time. Elevated high above Cambridge St, it was a simple, gable roofed structure. The small brick building constructed on the street alignment is also visible. Tyrone Cottage is also visible with its steeply pitched gable roof and dormers on the east facing roof slope. Another photograph also dated 1901 looking north along Gloucester St, shows the building occupying the north western section of the site at this time. It is clear that the early buildings on the site faced Cambridge St and possibly the Harbour and not Gloucester St. The buildings to the north of the site further along Gloucester St and the early street level are also visible.

It would appear that demolition of the buildings followed, probably overseen by the Government Architect's Branch. All buildings constructed before the introduction of building regulations requiring fire separation in 1838, were demolished in the Gloucester St area. Substantial buildings such as Susannah Place (1844) which were constructed with party walls were retained.

The 1908 plan of proposed workers housing projects includes the subject site on the eastern side of Gloucester St. The site continued to feature frontage to Cambridge St, by this time reduced to a 12 feet wide footway. Possibly in preparation of the proposed works, the level of Gloucester St around the site and Susannah Place was raised. The pavement and road were at a similar level until c. 1910, from which time Cumberland and Gloucester Sts were realigned.

No early plans of the building or site could be located, however, the Sands Directory indicates that the last of the earlier buildings occupying the site was demolished around 1902 and current buildings constructed between 1902 and 1911. In 1902 a Mrs Bridget Tate is listed in the Sands Directory occupying No. 46 Gloucester St. In the following years there is no listing between No. 44 and No. 58 Gloucester St. Nos. 46-56 Gloucester St are first listed in the Sands, with sixteen occupants, in 1912.

The Federation terrace taste for unrendered or face brickwork prompted important developments in building practices and technological developments in the manufacture of building elements. The concerns of the Housing Board, in addition to a general concern about increased durability of materials and ease of construction, may have influenced the design and construction of these buildings. Bricks at this time were generally dry pressed and fired at higher temperatures and therefore harder and more durable, which made sense for this type of public housing. Of greater importance, however, was the adoption of double skin brickwork, which was an innovation of this time. The general concern and requirement for improved and low maintenance materials is emphasised here with the incorporation of more durable elements such as the steel framed stair, wrought iron balustrades and concrete slab to the upper landing in preference to timber detailing typical of this period.

The Housing Board, established in 1912, probably took control of the buildings until 1924 when it was disbanded. From this time the Sydney Harbour Trust administered the sites and buildings resumed. It is not clear if any works were carried out during this period. In the 1930s the Maritime Service Board took over management of the area.

In 1970 the Sydney Cove Redevelopment Authority (SCRA) became the landlords. A report prepared for the Sydney Cove Redevelopment Authority dated January 1984 noted that all 16 cottages were occupied at this time. Six of the sixteen were occupied by Housing Commission tenants.

It was the policy of the SCRA to provide low cost housing within The Rocks to both those eligible for Housing Commission housing or previous SCRA tenants who had been relocated. At this time it was intended to retain the existing fabric and maintain current Housing Commission standards in terms of amenity and accommodation. A study dated 1984, prepared by Philip Cox and Partners Pty Ltd for SCRA outlined upgrading and development works to the building and site. The study also refers to a parcel land to the immediate north of the site which was considered to be part of the study and at the time contained two derelict cottages. In accordance with the planning strategies of the Sydney Cove Redevelopment Authority it was intended to demolish these cottages and use the land to form a link, pocket park between Gloucester and Cambridge Sts. The report included measured drawings of the terraces. The subject building was described as being in fair condition structurally, however, the level of amenities and services were not in accordance with the Housing Commission guidelines of that time.

In May 1984, discussions relating to the lease of the buildings were held between the Authority and the then Housing Commission. The proposal provided for a 53-year lease on a minimal rental. Discussions and negotiations continued and it was proposed that the lease term would be extended to 99 years. There was some confusion relating to the rental and other issues between the Authority and Commission including the rehousing of the Authority's tenants, so the agreement or lease was not finalised at this time, although the building was handed over for the commission to administer in January 1985.

During 1985 there was further correspondence, but the terms of the occupation beyond year 53 remained unsettled. Whilst this continued the Commission proceeded with the preparation of plans for the refurbishment of the building. In November 1988 Sydney Cove Redevelopment Authority formally leased all of the units to the New South Wales Land and Housing Corporation for a term of 99 years, ending in November 2087.

== Description ==
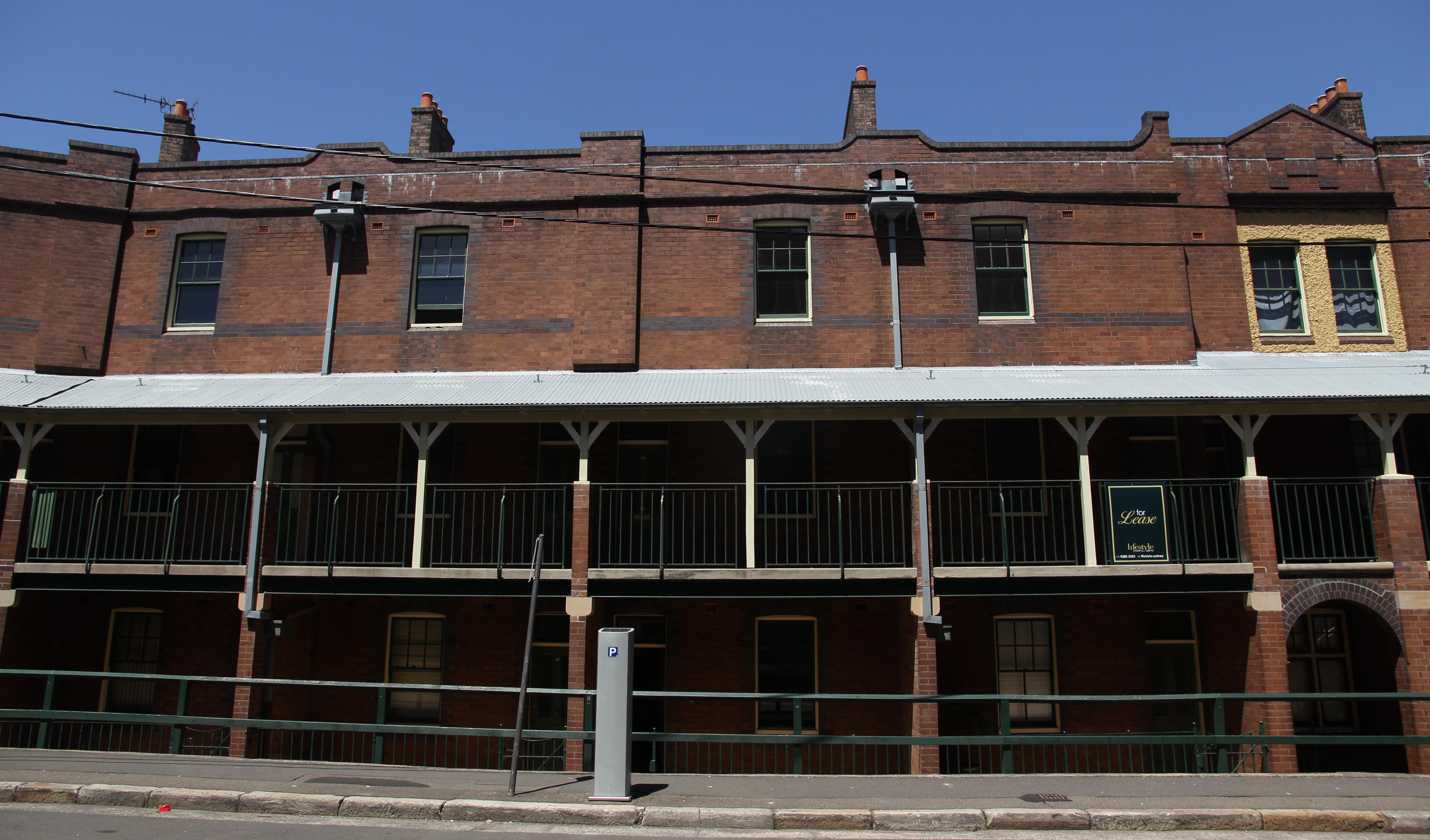
48-56 Gloucester Street, pictured in 2019.

The terrace, referred to as The Edwardian Cottages, at 46-56 Gloucester Street, The Rocks is a group of 16 duplex style three bedroom units arranged in eight terraces on four levels. The principal (or western) frontage is to Gloucester Street and there is a further frontage to Cambridge Street to the east. The terrace gently curves with the street.

Style: Edwardian terrace; Storeys: 4; Facade: Brick; Floor Frame: Timber; Ceilings: Metal

Archaeology Notes: 1917. Sydney harbour Trust terraced housing.

=== Condition ===
As at 3 May 2001, Archaeology Assessment Condition: Mostly disturbed. Assessment Basis: Recently restored. Terraced into hill slope.

== Heritage listing ==
As at 26 June 2002, Nos. 46–56 Gloucester Street are of State heritage significance for their historic and scientific cultural values. The site and buildings are also of State heritage significance for their contribution to The Rocks area which is of State heritage significance in its own right.

The Terraces at Nos. 46–56 Gloucester Street are historically significant as part of the major public works undertaken following the urban clearances in The Rocks. The buildings are good and largely intact early examples of public housing constructed in the first decade of the 20th century probably by the NSW Government Architect's Branch and demonstrate a concern for reasonable building and health standards in the construction and provision of housing to The Rocks residents.

The Terraces at Nos. 46–56 Gloucester Street are of historical and social significance due to the association with a number of government bodies including the Sydney Cove Redevelopment Authority, Department of Housing their predecessors and their various tenants, who have administered, maintained and occupied the building from its construction.

Nos. 46–56 Gloucester Street are technically and aesthetically significant in providing an innovative response to provision of housing on a sloping site, incorporating two storey duplexes that fit into the stepped topography. The stacking of the two-storey dwellings also demonstrates a design philosophy and requirement to provide ample public housing and the Government Architects Branch reference to overseas prototypes and models.

The Terraces significantly form part of a row of terraces (Nos. 26–72 with the exception of the No. 42–44, c. 1985) that demonstrate the evolution of terrace houses in Australia and are highly visible and make an active contribution to the Gloucester and Cambridge Streets streetscape.

The fabric and form of the building is representative of and demonstrates welfare and living standards and evolving construction techniques and materials of the early 20th century. They are a rare example of an early 20th century public housing scheme designed by the NSW Government Architects Branch constructed in The Rocks that also incorporates two storey units.

Terraces was listed on the New South Wales State Heritage Register on 10 May 2002 having satisfied the following criteria.

The place is important in demonstrating the course, or pattern, of cultural or natural history in New South Wales.

The irregular shape of the site is significant as it represents the early, "organic" growth of the area and realignment of the street following cleansing operations and attempt to rationalise the natural landform of the area in the first decade of the 20th century.

The Terraces at Nos. 46–56 Gloucester Street are historically significant as part of the major public works undertaken following the urban clearances in The Rocks. The buildings are good and intact early examples of public housing constructed in the first decade of the 20th century probably by the NSW Government Architect's Branch and demonstrate a concern for reasonable building and health standards in the construction and provision of housing of The Rocks residents.

The construction of the terraces is in part a result of a social and civic concern for the population of local residents and workers displaced by the urban clearances and demolitions. The terraces significantly retain their original form and spatial configuration and have continuously been used for public housing since their construction.

The buildings meet this Criterion on a State level.

The place has a strong or special association with a person, or group of persons, of importance of cultural or natural history of New South Wales's history.

The Terraces at Nos. 46–56 Gloucester Street are associated with a number of government bodies including the NSW Government Architect's Branch under the leadership of Walter Liberty Vernon, Housing Board, Sydney Harbour Trust, Sydney Cove Redevelopment Authority, Housing Commission and later Department of Housing, who have administered and maintained the building from its construction. The Government Architect's Branch prepared a number of schemes for "model" workers housing. Whilst the design of the terraces reflects the earlier, standard terrace house layout, the "stacking" of the dwellings and use of roof terraces may have been influenced by overseas prototypes. The housing constructed during this period by the Government Architects Branch, such as Nos. 46-56 Gloucester Street and terraces in Lower Fort Street are most like the later tenements designed by the Housing Board and differed in form and details from those constructed by the Sydney Harbour Trust. The buildings meet this Criterion on a State level.

The place is important in demonstrating aesthetic characteristics and/or a high degree of creative or technical achievement in New South Wales.

The Terraces are aesthetically significant as good and largely intact examples of Federation multistorey residential development that retain their original form, fabric and detailing. The buildings were designed to respect the scale of traditional terrace housing but significantly have been adapted to suit the site and local housing requirements.

Nos. 46–56 Gloucester Street are technically and aesthetically significant in providing an innovative response to provision of housing on a sloping site, incorporating two storey duplexes that fit into the stepped topography. The incorporation of basement levels allowed the building to be raised and address the higher Gloucester Street address. The stacking of the two-storey dwellings also demonstrates a design philosophy and requirement to provide ample public housing adopted by the Government Architect's Branch. The design and form of the building incorporates typical Federation period details such as face brick planes, rough cast rendered detail and timber details to verandah, but also advancements and improvement of building materials in the use of high brick walls, steel and concrete.

The Terraces significantly form part of a row of terraces (Nos. 26–72 with the exception of the No. 42–44, c. 1985) that demonstrate the evolution of terrace houses in Australia and reference to overseas models. The buildings occupy a prominent location, on the kink of the street and are highly visible when looking north and south of this section of Gloucester Street, their face brick facades and two storey verandahs being in contrast to the neighbouring bald face, rendered terraces on the eastern side of Gloucester Street. The buildings have a strong visual relationship with the Australian Hotel and make a positive contribution to the Gloucester Street streetscape.

The buildings are also visually prominent looking north along Cambridge Street from Cumberland Place. Again the large face brick planes of the south and eastern facades of the building are in contrast to the rendered and painted facades of the neighbouring buildings. The linear nature of the banded brick detail and access verandah on Level 3 reinforces the angle and kink of Gloucester Street. The smaller scale of Susannah Place and curve and form of the buildings also emphasises the aesthetic character of the buildings. The buildings meet this Criterion on a State level.

The place has a strong or special association with a particular community or cultural group in New South Wales for social, cultural or spiritual reasons.

The terraces at No. 46–56 Gloucester Street have strong association with the Department of Housing and its predecessors and to a lesser extent the Foreshore Authority and its predecessors as one of the earliest public housing properties that has and high social significance in the local community for its continuous provision of public housing in The Rocks area. From 1912 the terraces have continued to be occupied by a number individual and long term Sydney Harbour Trust/ Maritime Services Board/ SCRA, Housing Commission and now Department of Housing tenants. The buildings meet this Criterion on a State level.

The place has potential to yield information that will contribute to an understanding of the cultural or natural history of New South Wales.

The Terraces are technically significant for the incorporation of steel framing and concrete slabs and details to the front of the building in contrast to other contemporary buildings and early public housing constructed by the Sydney Harbour Trust which used prominent timber framing and details. This reflects both a consideration of local site conditions, but more so, improvements in building materials and design innovation relating to low maintenance and durability of building fabric, befitting public buildings.

The building retains its original form and evidence of the welfare and living standards of the early 20th century, construction techniques and materials. The terraces demonstrate changes in standard of living and technology with the rearrangement of spaces and provision of kitchens, internal wash areas and WCs.

The building straddles a sandstone ledge which is indicated along the north and southern site boundaries, however, the cleansing operations and demolitions in the first decade of the 20th century combined with the construction of the terraces would have disturbed most archaeological features or deposits relating to the former uses of the site. However, the houses sit on bedrock and are not cut into the bedrock, therefore wells, cesspits and rock cut features could still exist. The buildings meet this Criterion on a State level.

The place possesses uncommon, rare or endangered aspects of the cultural or natural history of New South Wales.

The Terraces are a rare example of an early 20th century public housing scheme designed by the NSW Government Architects Branch and constructed in The Rocks. Other contemporary examples are located in Millers Point or designed by the Housing Board. Nos. 46-56 Gloucester Street are a rare example of the two storey, Federation period public housing dwellings. Other units constructed during this time are single storey. The buildings meet this Criterion on a State level.

The place is important in demonstrating the principal characteristics of a class of cultural or natural places/environments in New South Wales.

The building is a good and largely intact representative example of a public housing complex constructed in the early decades of the 20th century. It is one of the earliest such buildings that represents a shift in the design of housing and contemporary concern for improvement of living conditions and provision of adequate housing following the urban clearances in The Rocks. The buildings meet this Criterion on a State level

== See also ==
- Australian residential architectural styles
