= Thomas Iceton =

Australian cricketer (1849–1908)

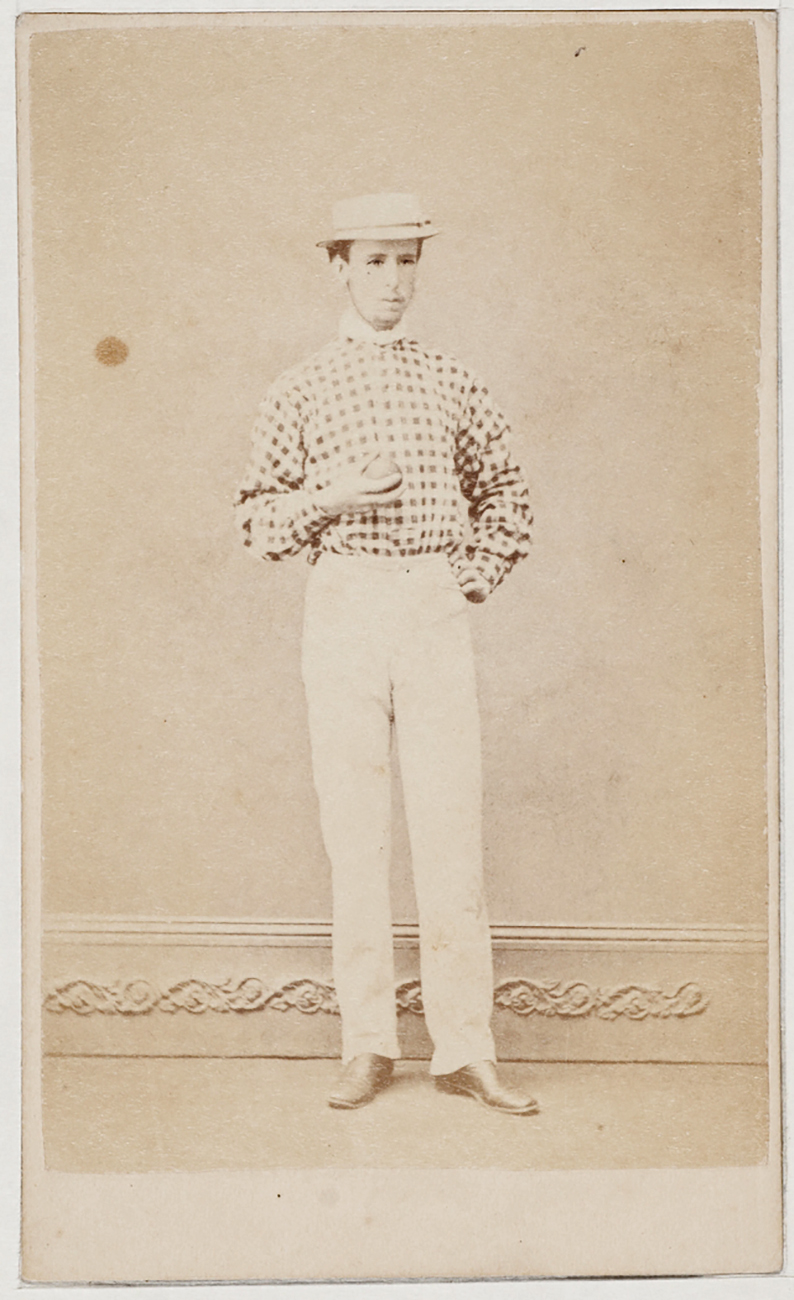

Personal information
- Born: 12 December 1849; Sydney, Australia
- Died: 19 May 1908 (aged 58); Ashfield, New South Wales, Australia
- Source: ESPNcricinfo, 1 January 2017

Thomas Iceton (12 December 1849 – 19 May 1908) was an Australian cricketer and solicitor. He graduated with an M.A. from Sydney University where he also distinguished himself as a cricketer. Iceton played one first-class match for New South Wales in 1877-78.

At the time of his death he worked for Messrs. Iceton and Faithfull, solicitors.

Iceton was found unconscious in his residence 'Durradoo,' in Holden Street, Ashfield on Monday 18 May 1908. He died later that day and the cause of death was ascertained to be a cerebral haemorrhage. He was buried in Rookwood Cemetery, Sydney.

== See also ==
- List of New South Wales representative cricketers
