= Index of weather extremes in Australia articles =

Australia is impacted by all forms of major weather events and extremes.

Below is an index of relevant articles.

== General ==
- Extreme weather events in Melbourne

== Floods ==
- Floods in Australia

=== Queensland ===
- 1893 Brisbane flood
- 1974 Brisbane flood
- 1998 Townsville floods
- March 2010 Queensland floods
- 2010–11 Queensland floods
- 2019 Townsville flood

=== New South Wales ===
- Floods in New South Wales
- 1955 Hunter Valley floods
- 1956 Murray River flood
- June 2007 Hunter Region and Central Coast storms
- 2011 Wollongong floods

=== Australian Capital Territory ===
- 1971 Canberra flood

=== Victoria ===
- 1909 Western Victorian floods
- 1956 Murray River flood
- 2010 Victorian floods
- Early 2011 Victorian floods

=== Tasmania ===
- 1929 Tasmanian floods
- June 1947 Tasmanian floods

=== South Australia ===
- 1956 Murray River flood

=== Western Australia ===
- 1900 Western Australian floods
- 2010 Gascoyne River flood
- 2018 Broome flood

== Storms ==
- Severe storms in Australia

=== Queensland ===
- 1992 Queensland storms

=== New South Wales ===
- June 2007 Hunter Region and Central Coast storms

=== Victoria ===
- 2005 Melbourne thunderstorm
- 2010 Victorian storms

== Tornados and water spouts ==
- List of Australia tornadoes
- 1918 Brighton tornado
- 1970 Bulahdelah tornado
- 1976 Sandon tornado
- 1992 Queensland storms
- 1992 Bucca tornado
- 2001 Sydney to Hobart Yacht Race waterspout
- 2003 Bendigo tornado

== Heat waves ==
- 2012-2013 Angry Summer
- Early 2009 southeastern Australia heat wave

== Cyclones and east coast lows ==
- Australian east coast low
- 1897 Darwin cyclone
- Ada
- Alby
- Alessia
- Althea
- Beni
- Chris
- Christine
- Clare
- Debbie
- Emma
- Tropical Low Fletcher
- Fran
- George
- Gillian
- Glenda
- Gwenda
- Herbie
- Ilona
- Inigo
- Ita
- Jasper
- Joan
- John
- Kate
- Kathy
- Kelvin
- Lam
- Larry
- Laurence
- Leonta
- Les
- Lua
- Mahina
- Marcia
- Marcus
- Monica
- Narelle
- Nina
- Orson
- Oswald
- Peter
- Rewa
- Rona
- Rosita
- Rusty
- Sam
- Sigma
- Steve
- Tasha
- Tessi
- Thelma
- Tracy
- Ului
- Vance
- Winston
- Yasi

== Rainfall ==
- 1950 Australian rainfall records

== Droughts ==
- Drought in Australia
- Federation Drought
- 1911–16 Australian drought
- 1979–83 Eastern Australian drought
- 2000s Australian drought

== Dust storms ==
- 1983 Melbourne dust storm
- 2009 Australian dust storm

== See also ==
- List of weather records, for individual weather records
- Climate of Australia
- Severe storm events in Sydney
