= 2003 Bendigo tornado =

F2 tornado in Bendigo, Victoria

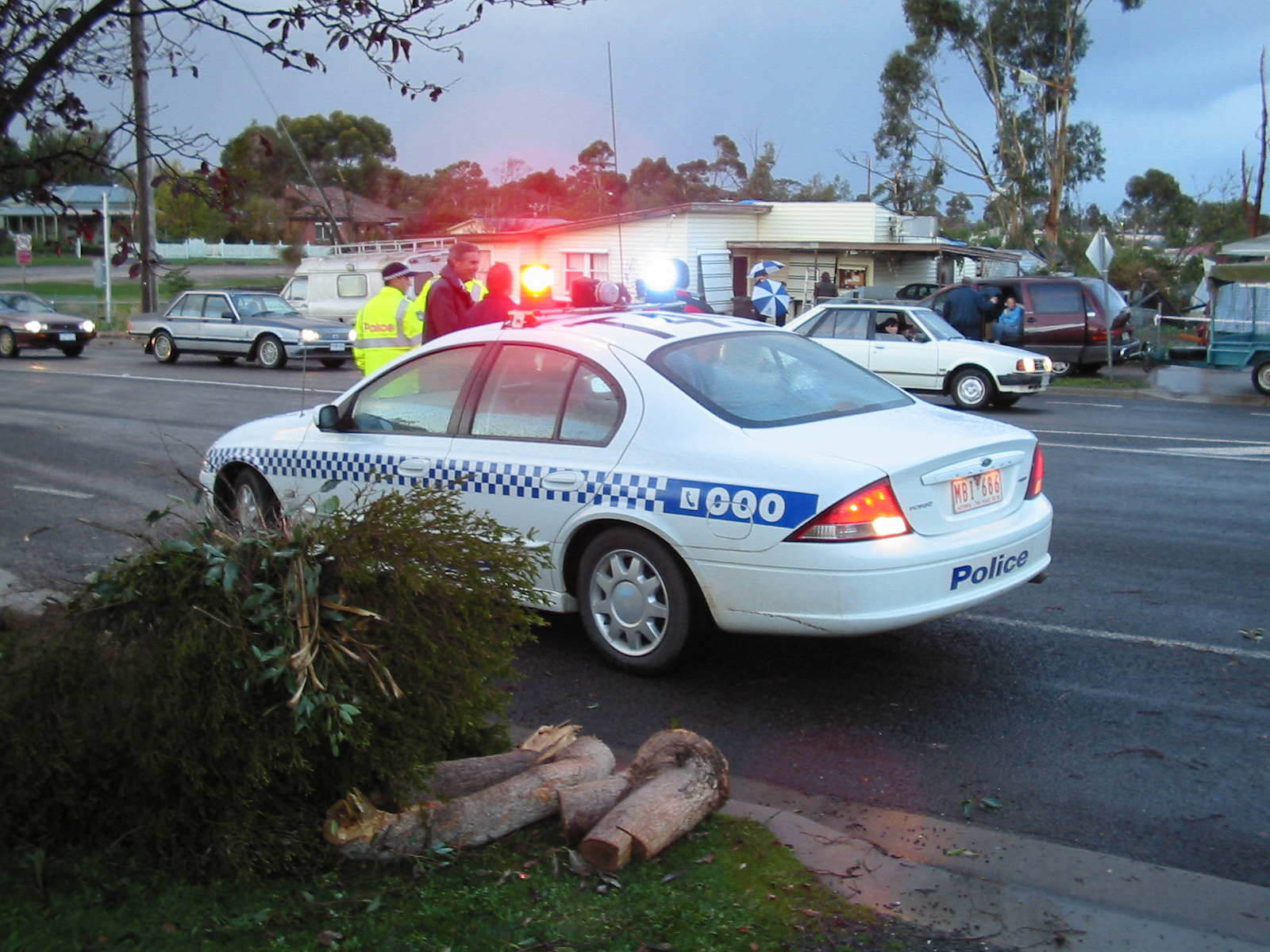
- Aftermath of the tornado at Nelson St, California Gully

Meteorological history
- Formed: 18 May 2003, 5:15 p.m. AEST (UTC+10:00)
- Dissipated: 18 May 2003, 5:25 p.m. AEST (UTC+10:00)
- Duration: 10 minutes

F2 tornado
- on the Fujita scale
- Max width: 500 m (550 yd)
- Path length: 7 km (4.3 mi)
- Highest winds: 180 km/h (110 mph)

Overall effects
- Fatalities: 0
- Injuries: 0
- Damage: Unknown (Note: There is no exact damage figure for the tornado's damage, but many sources reference the damage as "severe" or "devastating," pointing out that there was millions of dollars worth of damage.)
- Areas affected: Bendigo, Victoria and surrounding communities
- Power outages: 18,000
- Part of the list of Australian tornadoes and tornadoes of 2003

The 2003 Bendigo tornado was an F2 tornado which hit the city of Bendigo, Victoria, Australia about 6:30 pm on 18 May 2003. Wind speeds ranged from 210 km/h to 240 km/h at the core of the storm.

The city of Bendigo is located in Victoria, a southeastern state in Australia. This southeastern region of Australia has seen tornadoes in the past, but, according to the Bureau of Meteorology, the tornado was an unusual occurrence for central Victoria and the last similar event occurred in Wonthaggi in 1993.

== Impacts and Casualties ==
The tornado traveled seven kilometers with a 500-meter-wide path in less than ten minutes. The main areas hit were the city's northern suburbs of Eaglehawk and California Gully which had severe damage and power outages. Overall, no one was injured, but the tornado left eight homes destroyed, 44 homes with serious damages, trees torn up, and power was lost in up to 18,000 homes (located in Bendigo, California Gully, Eaglehawk, Epsom, Long Gully and Maiden Gully). Also, the tornado disrupted society as a whole with traffic disruption on the Loddon Valley Highway (runs from Bendigo to Kerang) and suspension of certain V/Line train lines. The damages were estimated to cost up to millions of dollars.

There was flash flooding and minor damage across other suburbs of the city (including Strathfieldsaye and Flora Hill) and other parts of central Victoria experienced power outages.

== Aftermath ==
Emergency efforts quickly started to get the area safe and electricity back into homes. Victims were also given assistance, including:

- The Department of Human Services, a department with the responsibility of helping to provide aids and services to the people of Australia, helped those who became homeless due to storm damages.
- The State Emergency Service (SES), a volunteer organization that provides help after declared disasters, responded to 128 calls and 70 SES volunteers from 11 different units helped to rebuild houses.
- The state government gave grants of up to $22800 which includes an emergency funding of $900 per household for people to purchase short-term accommodations and necessary supplies.
- The Insurance Council of Australia covered wind and storm damages for the insured.

== See also ==
- 1999 Salt Lake City tornado – Also struck a moderately large city
- 1876 Bowen tornado – The strongest tornado in Australian history
- 1992 Bucca tornado
- Bulahdelah tornado
- Brighton tornado
- Tornadoes of 2003
- List of Australian tornadoes
