= Snow in Australia =

Weather pattern

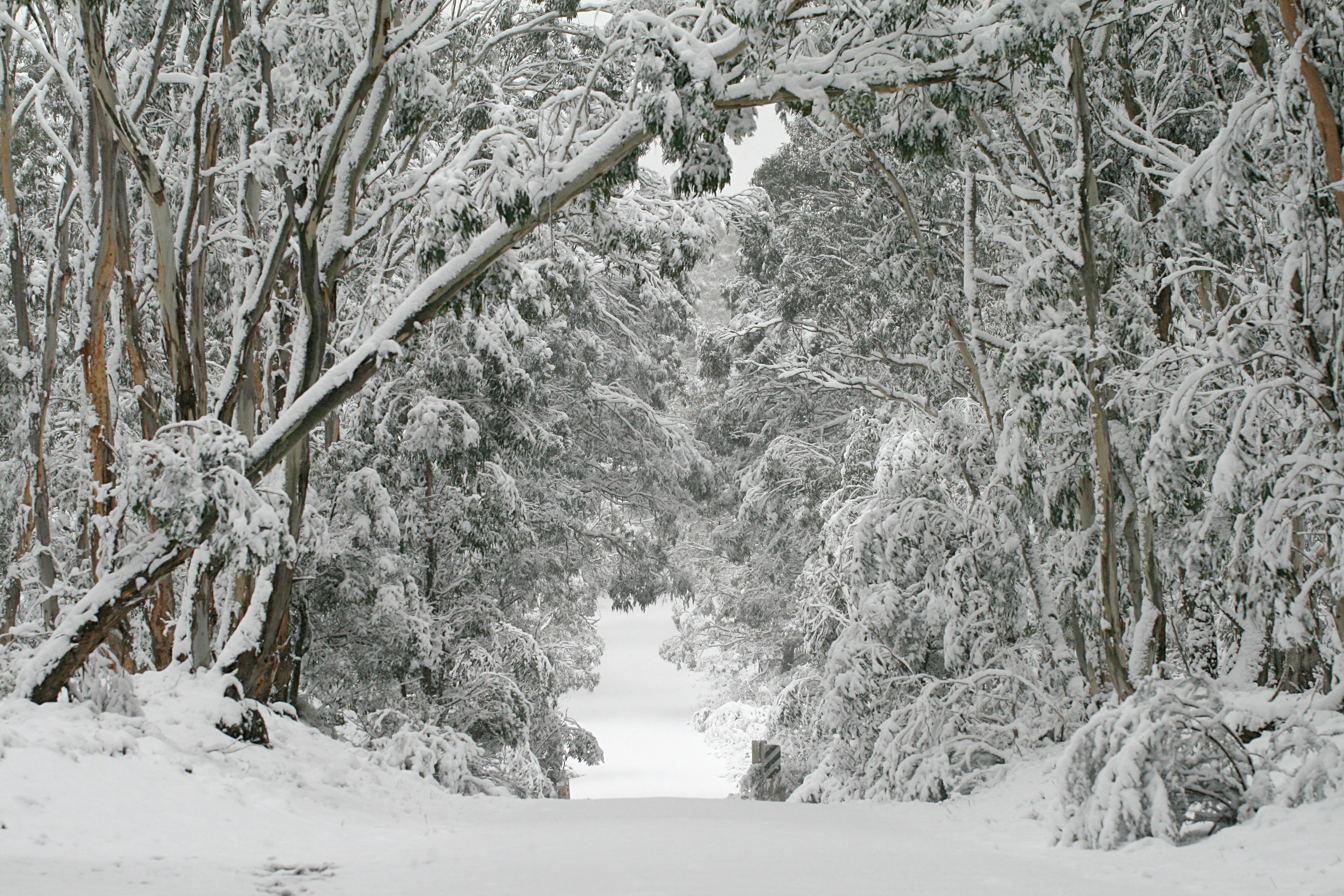
A rare cover of snow at Kanangra-Boyd National Park, Blue Mountains, 19 July 2011

Snow in Australia is rare at sea level, but is common on the highlands of the southeast, in the states of New South Wales, Victoria, Tasmania and in the Australian Capital Territory. Snow has been recorded in every state and territory, though among the state capitals only Canberra, Hobart and Melbourne have recorded snow. However it is much more common in the regional areas, with the cities of Orange and Ballarat featuring annual snowfalls and populations of over 40,000 and 120,000 respectively.

Snow sports are well established in Australia's south-east and Tasmania, though climate change has substantially reduced natural snowfall and opportunities for snowmaking at Australian resorts, particularly at the lower elevations, representing a threat to the viability of Australia's ski industry.

The Antarctic oscillation (AAO) is the primary driver for snow in Australia, where a negative phase allows cold airmasses off the Roaring Forties to push further north. The El Niño-Southern Oscillation (ENSO) and Indian Ocean Dipole (IOD) also play a role, though mainly in rainfall; there is a strong reduction in alpine snowfall during years of El Niño coupled with +IOD phases. Non-alpine and low-lying areas however tend to benefit from El Niño, as they are much more reliant on cold air than rainfall, being associated with a weaker jet stream that allows cold air to be displaced more readily to Australian latitudes.

== Climatology ==
=== Incidence and variability ===
Only in the Australian Alps in the southeast and in the mountains of Tasmania does a winter snowpack develop. Areas that do get snowfalls most winters but do not develop a winter snowpack include the South Eastern Highlands of New South Wales, the Central Highlands and Otway Ranges of Victoria, and the low lands of Tasmania. Snowfall elsewhere is an unusual event.

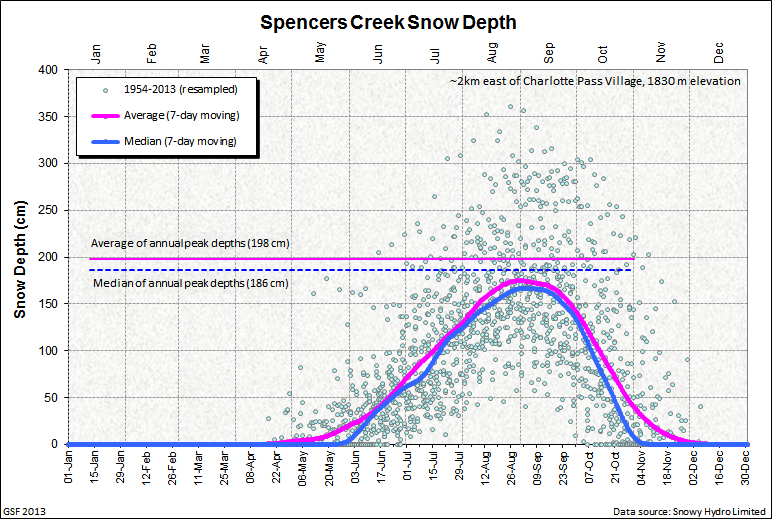
Spencers Creek average snow depth chart from Snowy Hydro

Snowfall in Australia is highly variable according to the Australian Bureau of Meteorology. For example in 1973 temperatures remained too warm for much snow, while 1981 saw deep snow followed by a winter almost too dry for snow in 1982. However, historically most other years saw abundant winter snow. The unpredictability of Australian snow conditions was again highlighted in 2006 when a severe drought and poor snow season gave way to a "White Christmas" in December (early summer): abundant snow falls in the alpine regions of New South Wales, Victoria and Tasmania and even a low-level snowfall on 25 December in the Dandenong Ranges, a low mountain range on Melbourne's eastern suburban fringe.

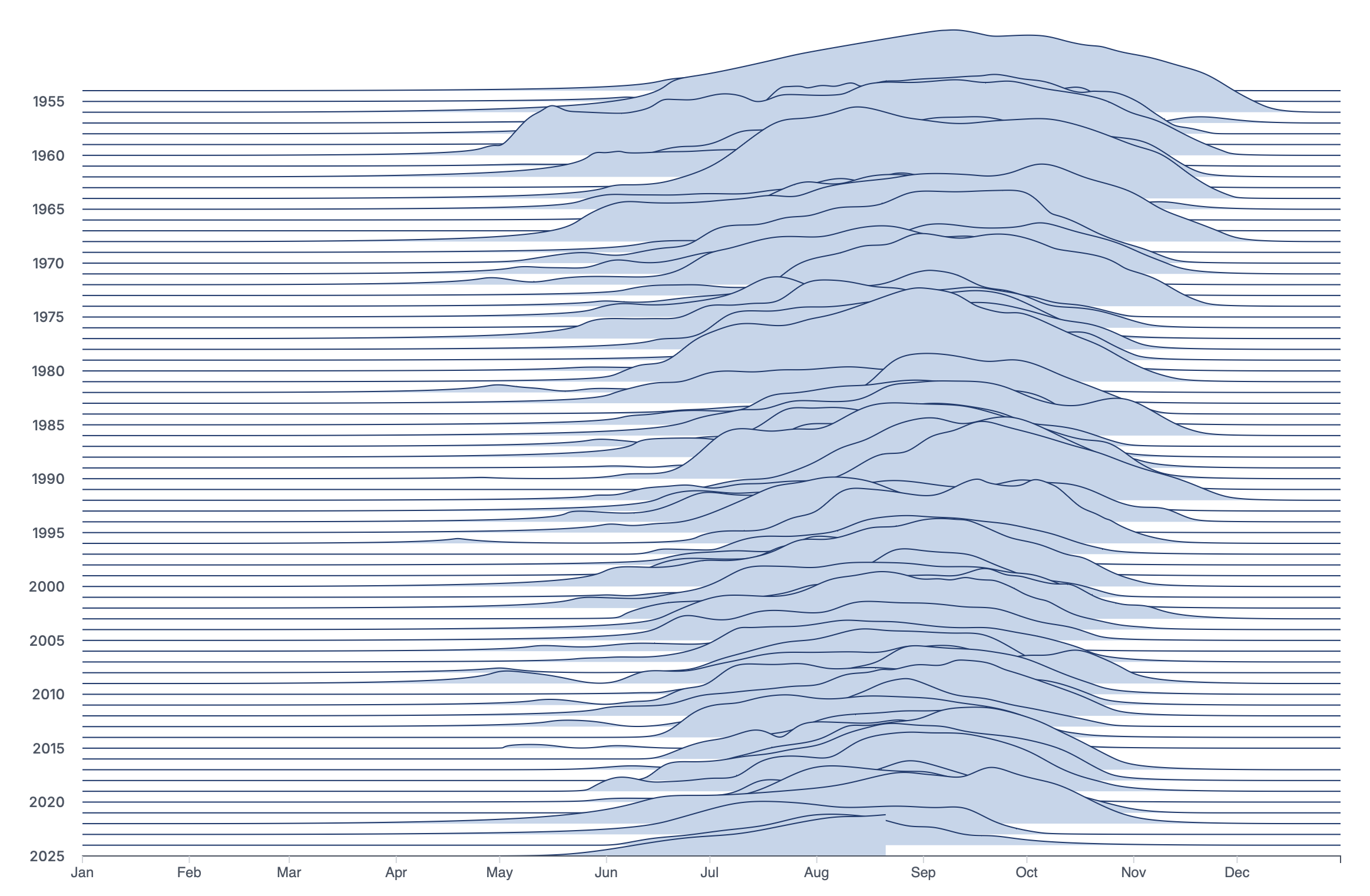
Visualisation of historical snow depth from 1954 to 2025 as measured at Snowy Hydro's Spencers Creek snow depth measurement site (1830 metres above sea level)

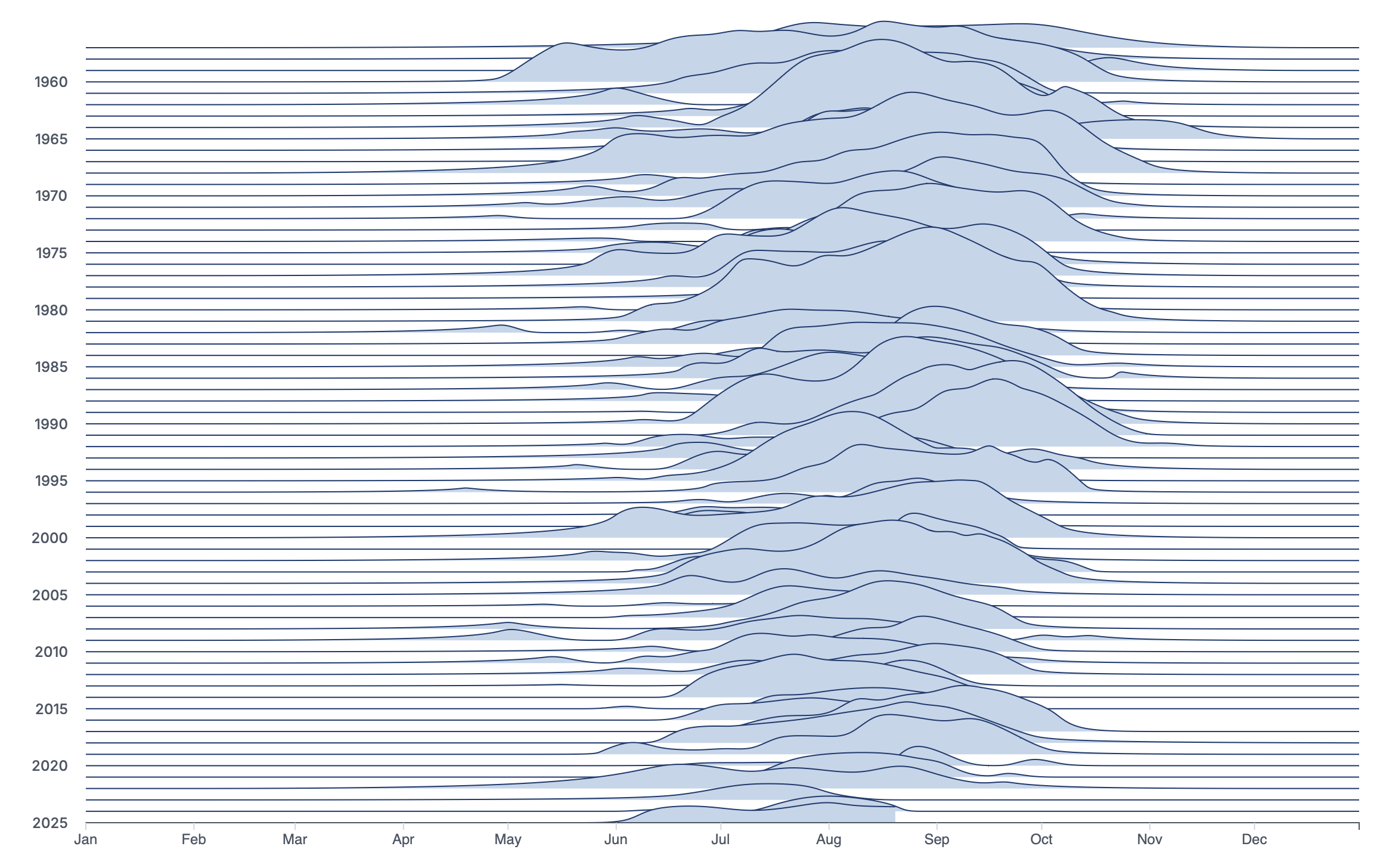
Visualisation of historical snow depth from 1954 to 2025 as measured at Snowy Hydro's Deep Creek snow depth measurement site (1630 metres above sea level)

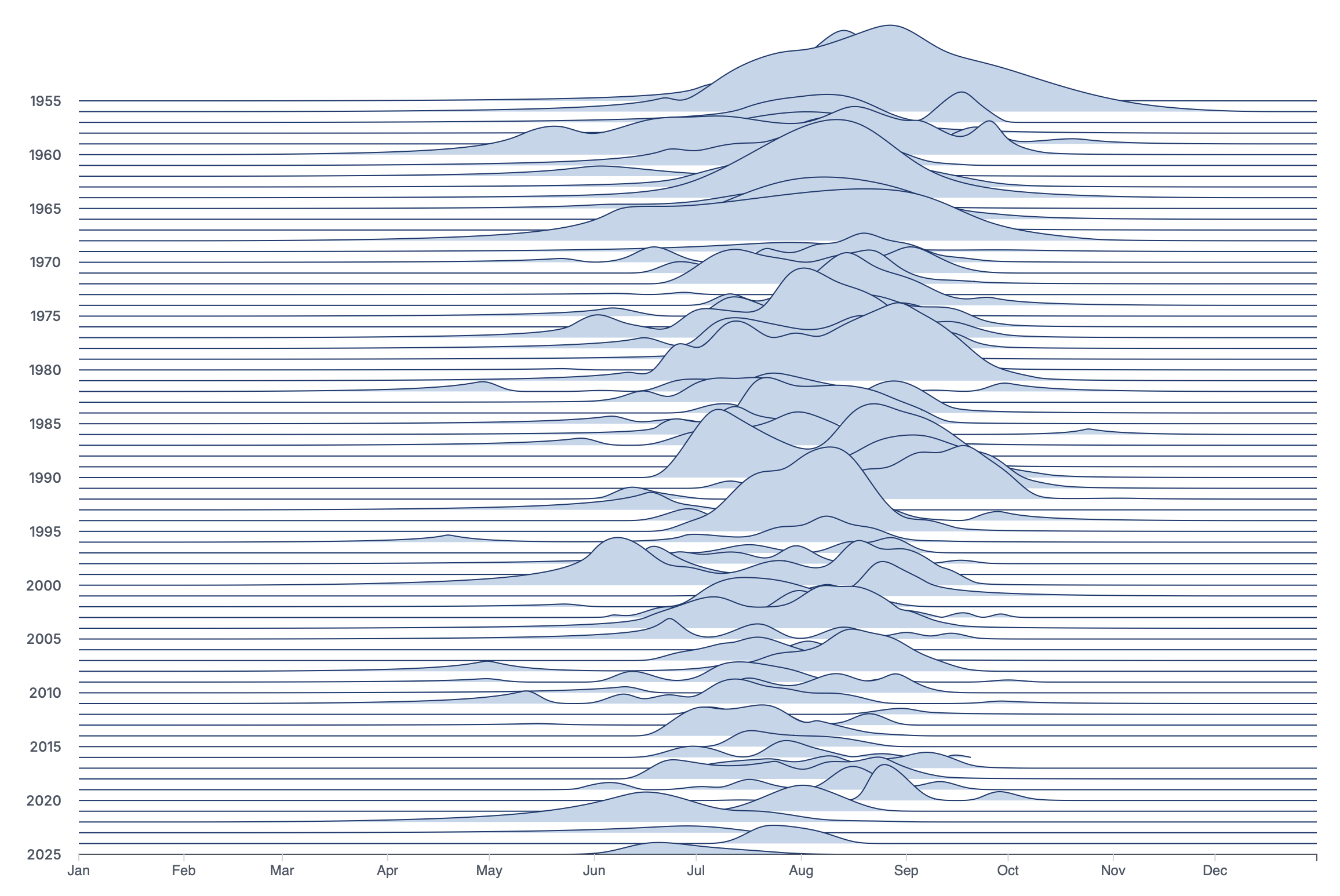
Visualisation of historical snow depth from 1954 to 2025 as measured at Snowy Hydro's Three Mile Dam snow depth measurement site (1400 metres above sea level)

Low altitude and low-moderate latitude; as well as seasonal (early spring) dust storms in the Simpson Desert depositing red dust on the ranges (causing less UV reflection and therefore faster melting), keep the snow season relatively short (June–Oct). Heavy snow can fall however, at any time between April and December in the Australian High Country, with areas like Mount Dandenong receiving snow in December. In past decades heavy natural snow seasons have seen the snowpack reach 3 metres (9.8 ft) or more at its maximum depth in August, at an elevation of 1,830 metres (6,000 ft), Spencers Creek, the Australian Alps, New South Wales, but the last time this happened was in 1992.

=== Climate change ===
Satellite image of unusually massive snow cover over the Southern Tablelands, June 2019

The Australian snow season varies greatly from year to year, however precise measurements since 1954 confirm a significant declining trend in the average maximum snow depth, with a downward tendency of about 0.4–0.6 cm (depending on altitude) per year since 1954. This is a result of increasing mean temperatures and especially decreasing cold extremes in the winter, leading to an increase in alpine rain events and less reliable snowfalls.

The years 2023 and 2024 had very weak snow seasons owing to the remarkably warm conditions from June to July, and drier than normal August to September with extreme high mean temperature anomalies. Later, 2026 saw the lowest-ever snowpack at lower sites like Deep Creek and Three Mile Dam due to unprecedented warm and wet conditions brought on by tropical rains off the north-west, measuring just 5.5 cm at Three Mile Dam (where the previous lowest was 13.5 cm in 2023).

Since 1950, the Australian Alps' annual average temperature has risen by around 1.4 degrees Celsius. Australia's ski resorts are located near the top of the highest mountains in Australia with little scope to relocate to higher altitudes if the existing ski fields become too warm.

== Alpine areas ==
=== Australian Alps (mainland) ===
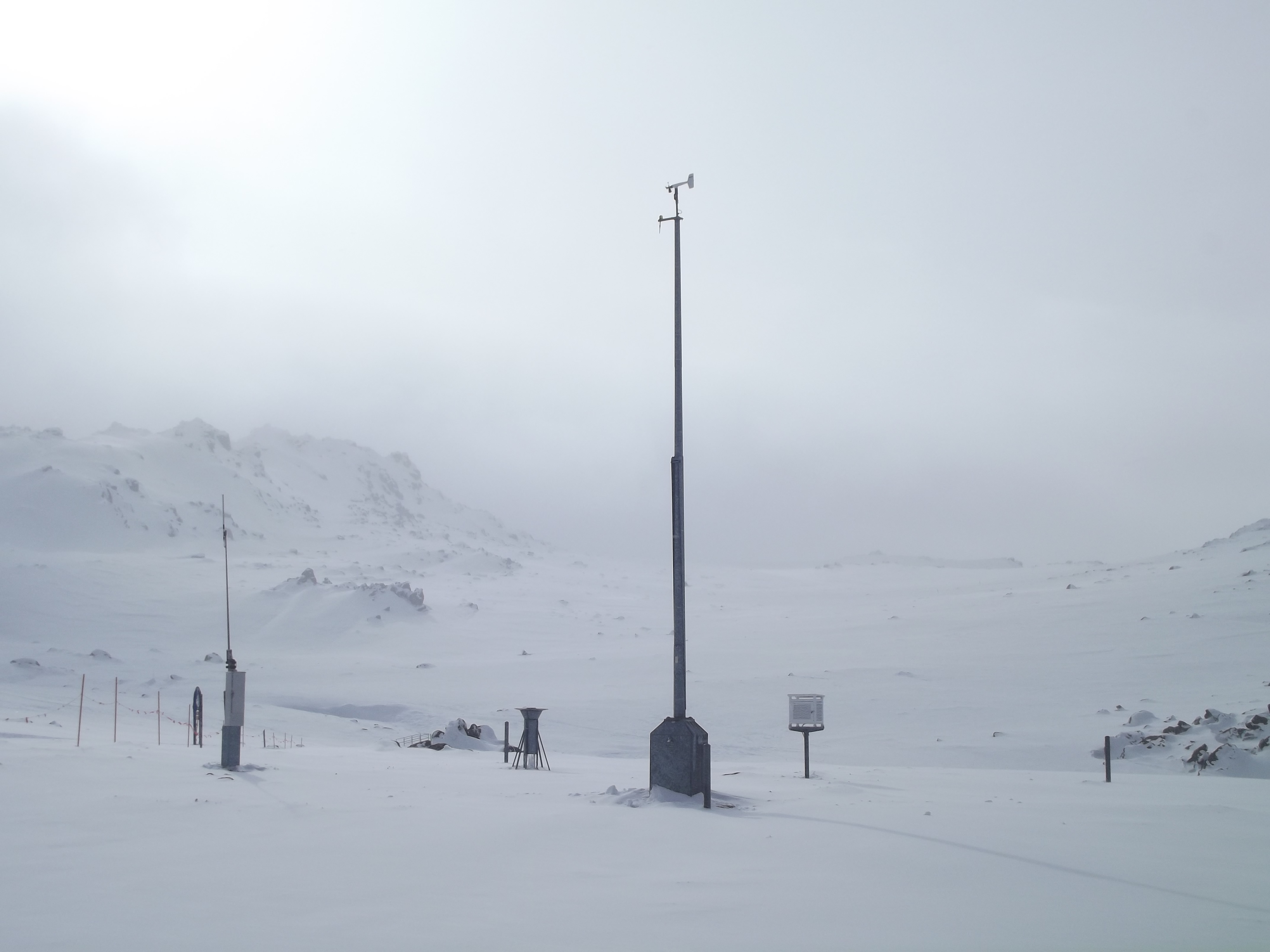
Snow over Thredbo Top Station, July 2011

In southern New South Wales, the Australian Capital Territory and eastern Victoria, the elevated regions of the Snowy Mountains, Brindabella Range and Victorian Alps experience an alpine climate, where the areas above 1,400 metres (4,600 ft) are subject to a consistent winter snowpack. Heavy snow normally occurs down to around 900 metres (3,000 ft) above sea level, especially on the western side of the ranges, while lighter and more sporadic snowfalls occur down to 600 metres (2,000 ft) most years.

Kiandra, Cabramurra and Perisher Valley receive an average of 47.5, 53.2 and 60.2 snowy days annually, respectively – elevations are 1,395 metres (4,577 ft), 1,475 metres (4,839 ft) and 1,735 metres (5,692 ft) in that order. For northern hemisphere comparison, Kiandra receives more annual snowy days than Toronto (41 days) and Harbin (45 days), with Cabramurra tying with Winnipeg (54 days) and Perisher Valley with Buffalo, New York (60 days).

In the Victorian Alps, Falls Creek, Mount Hotham and Mount Buller receive 61.2, 66.1 and 67.6 snowy days, respectively. Elevations are 1,765 metres (5,791 ft), 1,783 metres (5,850 ft) and 1,707 metres (5,600 ft) in that order. For northern hemisphere comparison, Mount Hotham receives slightly more snowy days than Syracuse, New York (65.5 days), and Mount Buller receives almost the same amount of snowy days as Warsaw (68 days).

In the Gippsland region, the alpine areas of Mount Baw Baw, 1,567 metres (5,141 ft) and Mount St Gwinear, 1,509 metres (4,951 ft), are prominent snow destinations, both situated within the Baw Baw Plateau. These peaks experience snowfall primarily driven by moist southerly and south-westerly airstreams funneled through the Latrobe Valley via Bass Strait, contributing to their relatively high snowfall amounts despite their low elevations compared to other resorts. Due to their extreme southern latitude they are more susceptible to snowfalls outside of winter and even in late spring and summer.

=== Tasmanian Highlands ===
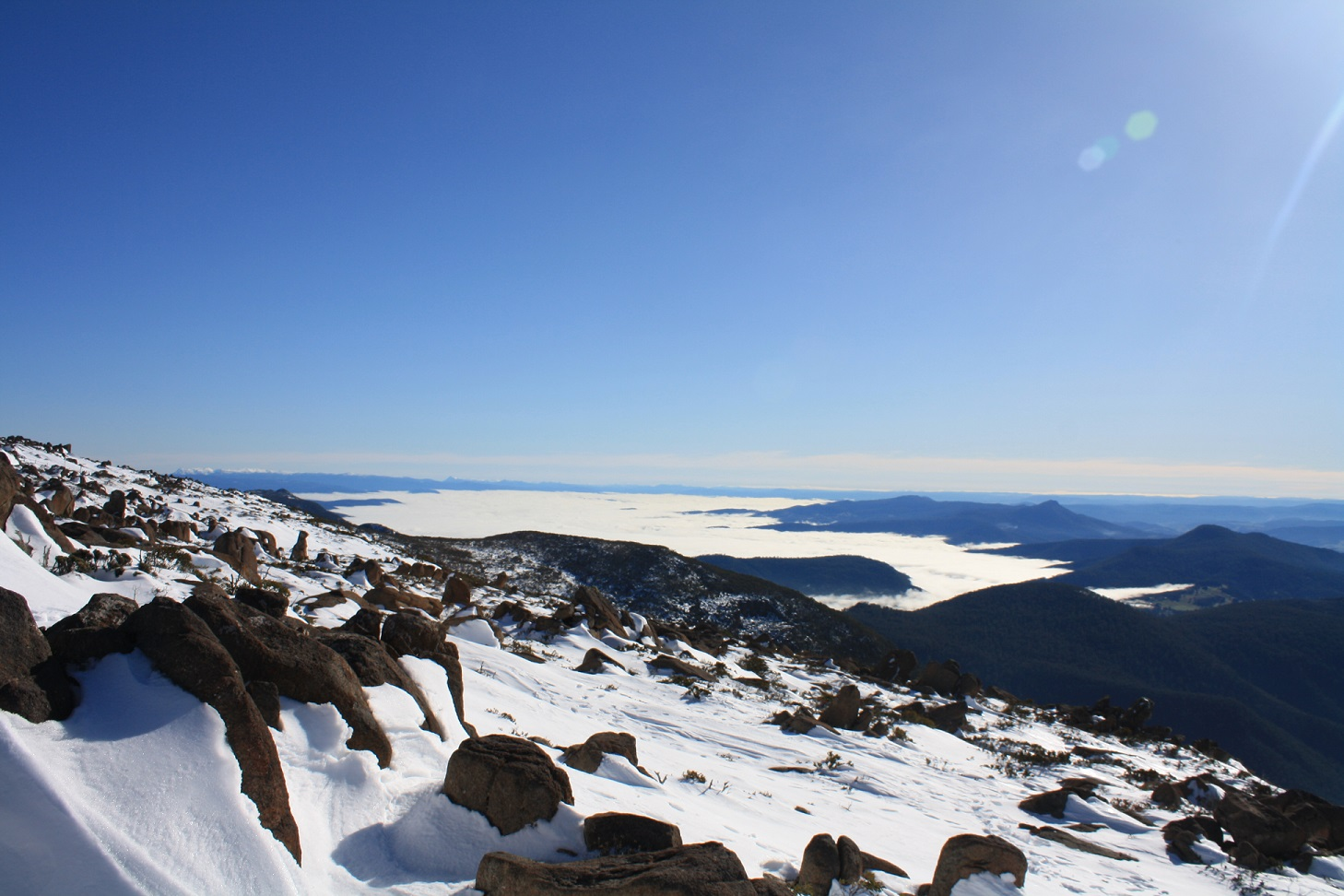
Snowcapped Mount Wellington in July 2011

In Tasmania, mountainous areas receive heavy snow above an altitude of 600 metres (2,000 ft) every year, and due to its far southern latitude, this level frequently drops to 450 metres (1,480 ft) and at times even 200 metres (660 ft) in the south and west of the state. Mount Wellington which rises to 1,271 metres (4,170 ft) is frequently covered by snow, at times even in summer, receiving 57.3 days of snow annually.

Butlers Gorge, Lake St Clair and Liawenee in the Central Highlands feature 27.1, 33.1 and 41.8 snow days a year, respectively. Elevations are 666 metres (2,185 ft), 750 metres (2,460 ft) and 1,065 metres (3,494 ft) in that order.

== Regional towns and cities ==
=== New South Wales and the Australian Capital Territory ===
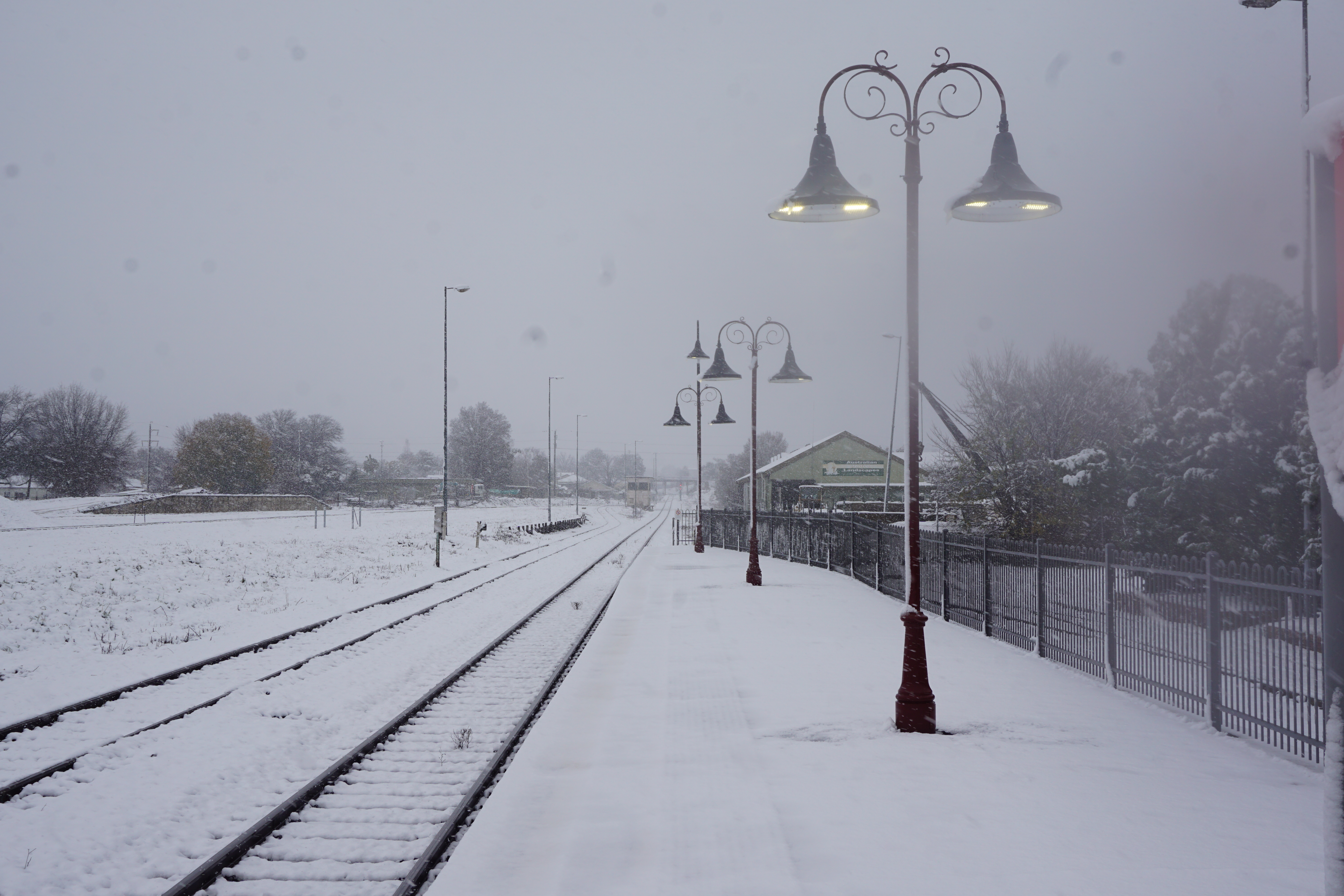
Snow at Orange railway station, June 2020

In the Central West, the major regional city of Orange receives an average of 3.9 snowy days per annum. There are many smaller towns in the region that receive snow on an annual basis, such as Blayney, Millthorpe and particularly Oberon which sees an average of 6.2 snowy days annually. The last snowfall in Cowra, a town of just 300 metres (980 ft), occurred in 2015. A freak snowfall had occurred in the Central West on 5 July 1900, bringing an impressive 1 ft 10 in (56 cm) of snow to Mudgee, while Bathurst measured at 68 centimetres (27 in) in the main street.

Heading east to the upper Blue Mountains, in towns such as Katoomba, Medlow Bath, Wentworth Falls, Leura, Mount Victoria, Blackheath and Lithgow, 3–4 snowfalls per year are recorded. Being on the eastern side of the ranges, snow is confined to higher elevations due to the foehn effect, and it is extremely rare to see snow below Lawson.

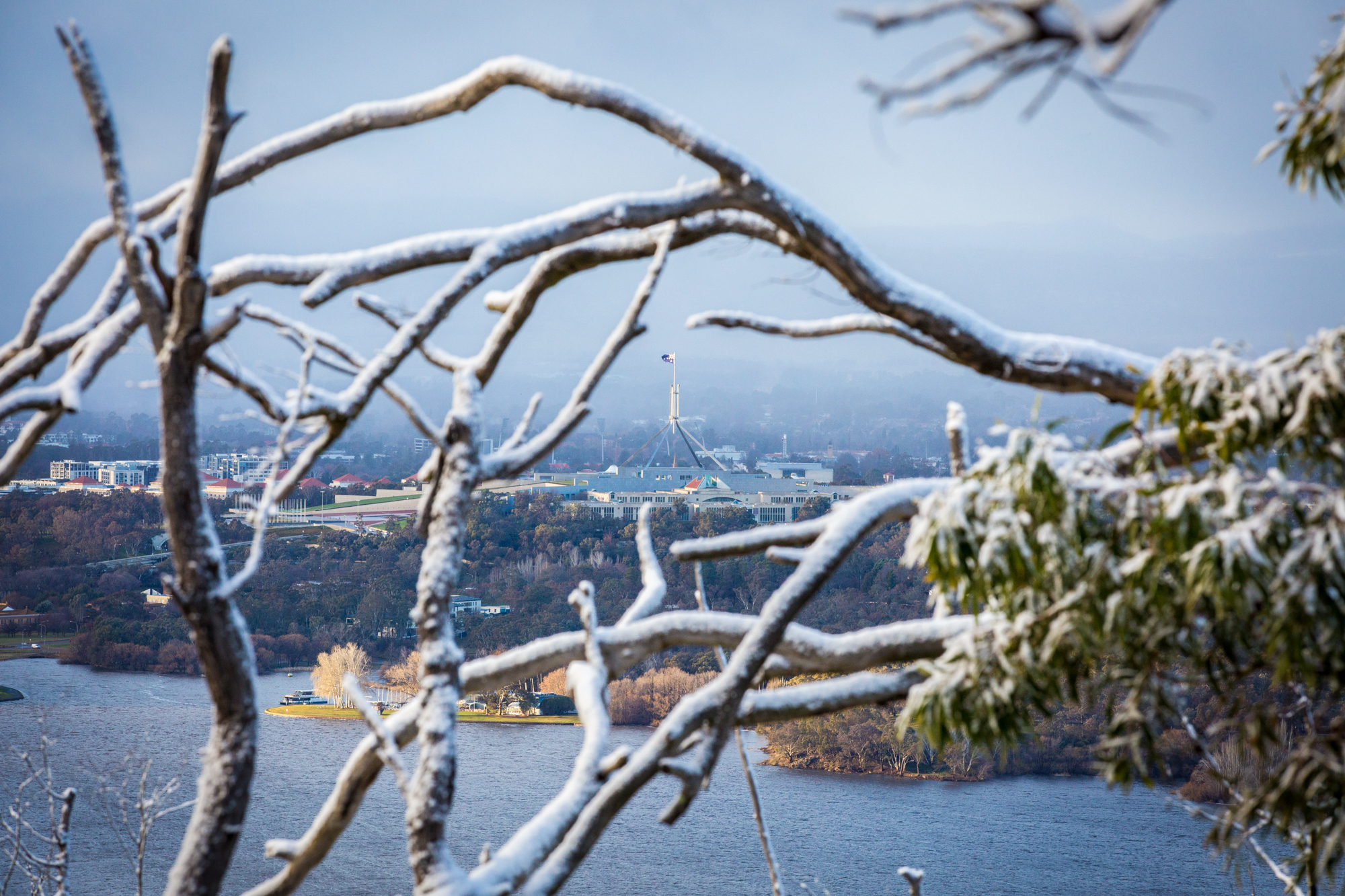
Snow in Canberra, July 2016

Snow is relatively rare in the Southern Highlands of the Illawarra due to its eastern location, though the last significant snowfall occurred in Berrima, Bowral and Mittagong in July 2015. In 1947, the Macquarie Pass road was covered in a dusting of snow. Further south in the nation's capital Canberra, it snows once every few years, though snowfalls are common in the Monaro region to the far south, in towns such as Cooma, Bombala and particularly Nimmitabel which sees eight snowy days annually.

Following the Hume Highway further inland, it snows occasionally in the regional city of Goulburn and in towns like Gunning and Yass. The northern and north-western parts of the region are substantially higher in elevation, with moderate to heavy snowfalls occurring most years in Crookwell and to a lesser extent Taralga. Going further inland to the South West Slopes, it snows regularly in the town of Batlow (and by extension Tumbarumba), with frequent heavy snow at Laurel Hill. In August 2019 there was snow on the ground in Tumut at 280 metres (920 ft), with reports of flakes as far north-west as Junee.

In western New South Wales, particularly in the Riverina, snow is observed to much lower altitudes than elsewhere in the state, being more exposed to cold south-westerly airmasses. Parkes, Forbes and Wagga Wagga, among others, have recorded snow on multiple occasions in the past, despite their very low elevation; snow has been observed to settle as low as 165 metres (541 ft) in Albury, most recently in July 1966. Snow has been recorded on three separate occasions in Narrandera, 145 metres (476 ft), in August 1899, July 1901 and June 1908.

In northern New South Wales, snow is recorded once or twice every few years in Guyra, Armidale and Glenn Innes on the Northern Tablelands, and rather scantily, in Nundle (near Tamworth). Going further inland to Gunnedah, in the North West Slopes at just 285 metres (935 ft), the most recent snowfall occurred in 1984. In Dubbo, in the Orana region, it last snowed in July 1951 and 1920, with a heavy snowfall in July 1900. The far northern town of Inverell, 580 metres (1,900 ft) and nearing the 29th parallel, last saw snow in August 1923, with an impressive 4 to 5 inches (10 to 13 cm) falling in September 1892.

=== Victoria and Tasmania ===
Due to their latitude and exposure to cold south-westerly airmasses, snow regularly occurs at much lower elevations than in New South Wales, with some occurrences to sea level.

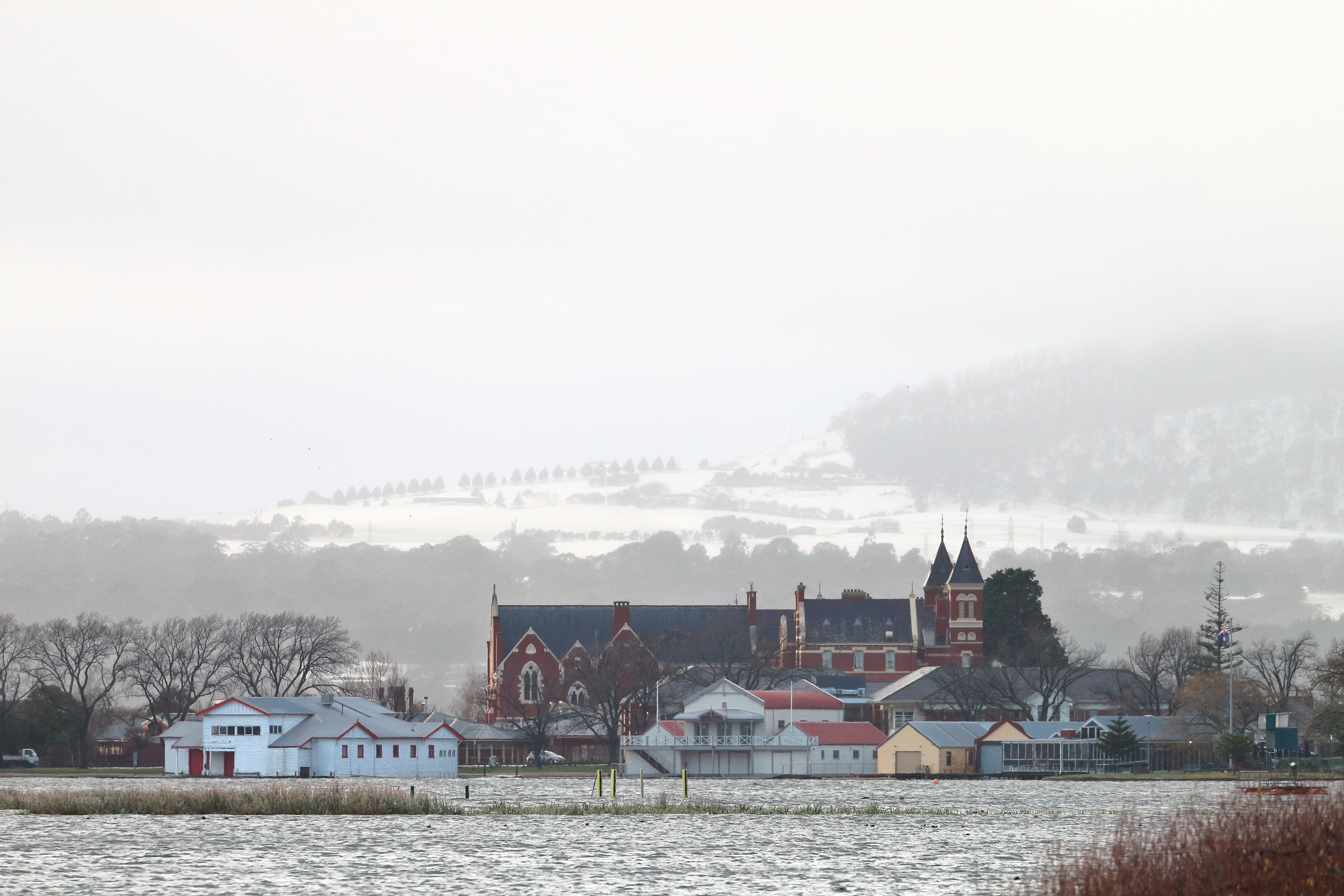
Snow over Ballarat in September 2020

In western and central Victoria it snows around once or twice a year in the major regional city of Ballarat, as well as in Kyneton and Strathbogie, while in Trentham it snows on 7.8 days per annum. Horsham and Hamilton have recorded significant snowfalls in 1882, 1888, 1901 and most impressively October 1910 (at Hamilton), with a few occurrences north to Bendigo.

In Victoria's North-East, Beechworth snows about once or twice a year, while the higher localities of Bogong, Tolmie and Woods Point receive 5.7, 8.7 and 7.8 snow days per annum, with occasional snowfalls in low-lying towns like Corryong. A heavy fall of snow was observed in Benalla on 31 May 1913.

In East Gippsland, the locality of Bendoc averages 14.7 snowy days per annum, while Omeo sits at 4.7 days. Unlike the rest of the state, this region receives the majority of its snow events from southerly weather systems off the Bass Strait (being largely sheltered from the west).

In southern Victoria and West Gippsland, there is a greater chance of late spring and summer snowfall, with an occurrence of snow on 25 December 2006 in the Dandenong Ranges, not more than 630 metres (2,070 ft) in elevation. Snow to 400 metres (1,300 ft) or less is not uncommon during winter, particularly on the Strzelecki Ranges in the deep south of the mainland. The former town of Aberfeldy averages 32.5 snowy days per annum at 1,060 metres (3,480 ft), making it the snowiest locality in mainland Australia, in addition to having more snowy days than northern hemisphere cities with colder winters like Boston (23.0 days), Chicago (28.2 days) and even approaching those of Minneapolis (38.2 days).

In Tasmania, towns nearer to sea level such as Queenstown, Zeehan, Oatlands, Bothwell and Rosebery feature around 2–3 snow days per year, with Erriba recording 8.6 days, Waratah in the northwest recording 9.5 snow days per annum, Strathgordon around 12.7 days, Tarraleah in the Central Highlands recording 14.1 snow days and Bronte Park also in the Central Highlands registering 17.6 snow days per annum.

=== South Australia and Western Australia ===
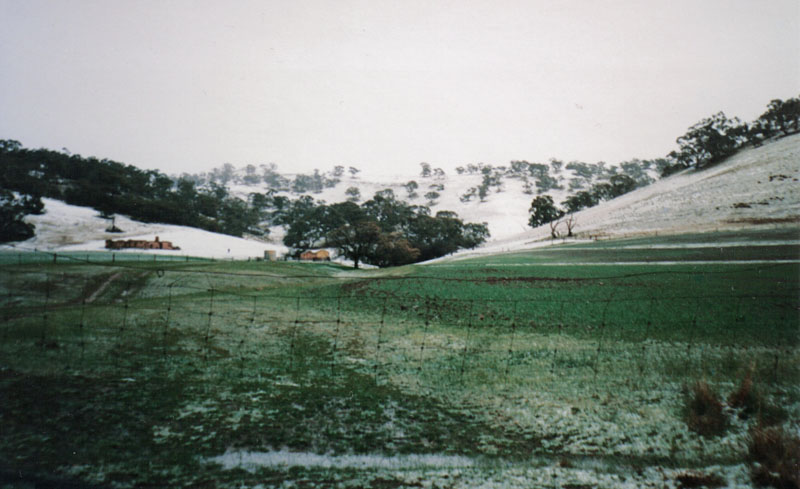
Snow near Jamestown, South Australia in the Flinders Ranges, 1994

Snow has fallen in the hill suburbs of Adelaide (Adelaide Hills), with the last major snowfall in July 1951, and the Perth region (Perth Hills around Kalamunda, Roleystone and Mundaring, with the most recent snowfall occurring in 1968 and in 1956). In the Flinders Range, snow has been recorded in the Wilpena Pound and at Blinman, with the last significant snowfall being recorded in August 2020.

The Stirling Range (near Albany) records snow every year, as it is the only mountain range far enough south and sufficiently elevated in Western Australia. More rarely, snow can fall on the nearby Porongurup Range, with the last significant falls in October 1992 and June 1956. The most widespread low-level snow in Western Australia occurred on 26 June 1956 when snow was reported in Wongan Hills and Salmon Gums.

=== Queensland and the Northern Territory ===
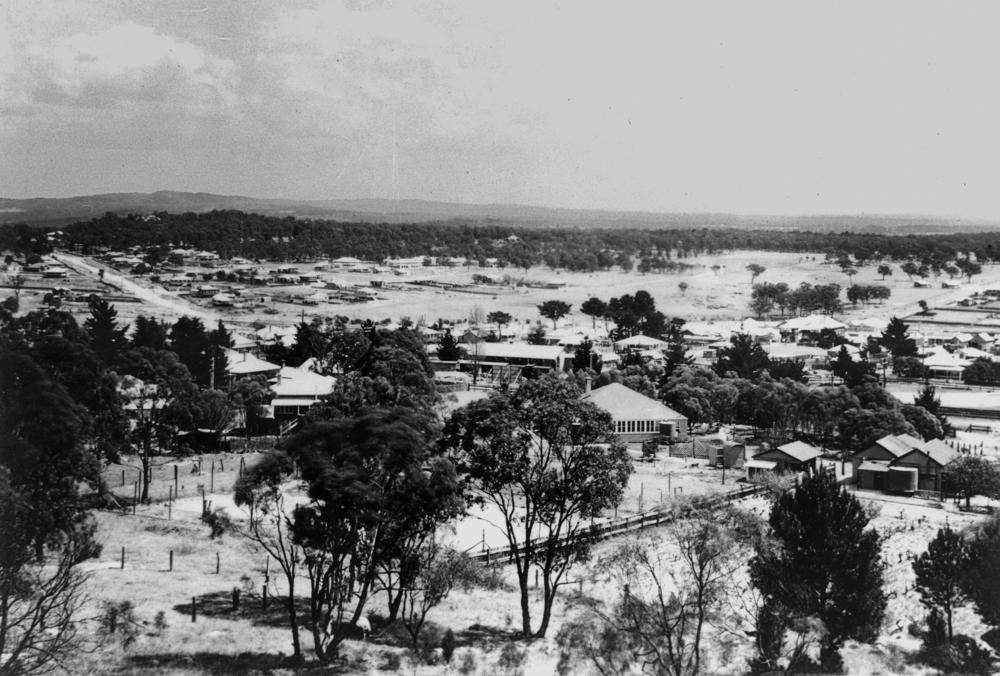
Snow in Stanthorpe in 1925

In the Northern Territory, light snow last fell on Uluru on 11 July 1997, being the most northerly verified snowfall in Australia (nearing the 25th parallel).

The Darling Downs and Granite Belt in South East Queensland occasionally receive snowfall in winter, with heavy falls being recorded in 1960, 1974, 1984, 2007 and 2015. Snow has been reported on the higher parts of Toowoomba on several occasions, with the recent event being in July 2015. In Stanthorpe, light snow is occasionally recorded, with the most significant snowfall in over 30 years occurring on 17 July 2015, where 8 centimetres (3 in) fell there and nearby areas that day. Ballandean in south-east Queensland also saw snow that day.

The most northerly occurrence of snow in Queensland was on the Bunya Mountains, just below the 27th parallel. In July 1965, 'snow' was alleged as far north as Eungella, near Mackay in tropical Queensland, however this was more than likely an occurrence of graupel. The 'snow' was described by locals as "little cotton buds" (indicating graupel or small hail), further invalidating the account. Thus the northernmost snowfall in Australia remains to be that at Uluru in 1997.

== Sea level snowfall ==
=== Tasmania ===
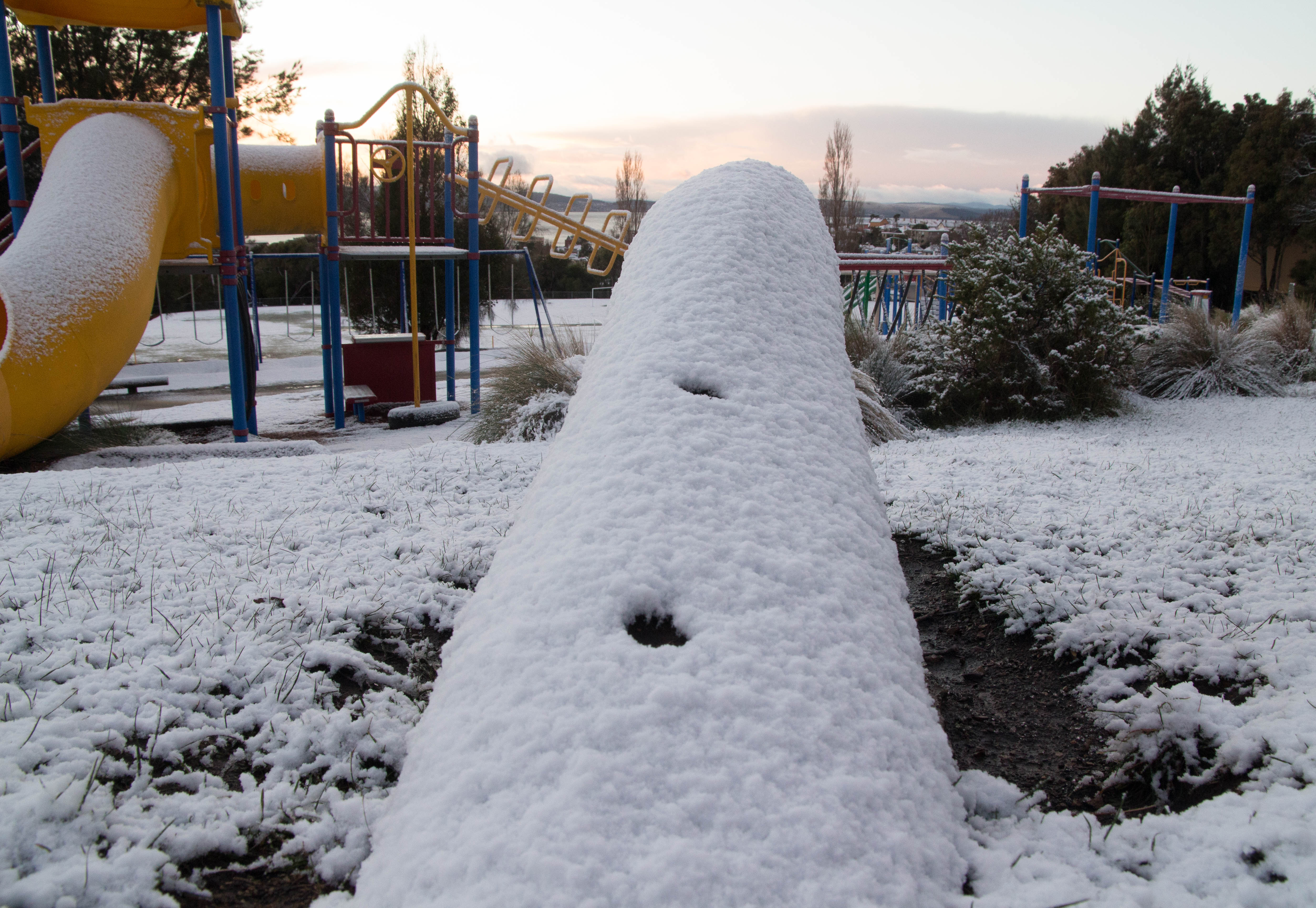
Snow in Hobart, August 2015

Whilst snow at sea level is a very rare occurrence in mainland Australia, it is more occasionally recorded in southern and south-western Tasmania, where it occurs on a near-annual basis during the winter and early spring months. Sea level snow has even been recorded in November (2021, on Bruny Island). It is much rarer on the east coast of Tasmania due to being leeward of the snow-bearing westerlies (save for the far south).

Launceston in the north-east receives snowfall on the rare occasion, with snow falling in 1951, 1986, 2015 and 2020. Dover, a coastal town in the southern fringe of Tasmania, features 2.3 snow days per year. In the Hobart central business district, the last major snowfalls occurred in 2015, 1986 and 1921.

=== Victoria and South Australia ===
Snow at sea level in Melbourne last occurred in August 2005, in the Melbourne's southern suburbs near Mornington Peninsula. Though Melbourne central business district has not recorded snow since 1986.

In South Australia, there are two known occurrences of snow in Mount Gambier, only 60 metres (200 ft) above sea level, in 1951 and 1932.

=== New South Wales ===
The lowest known snowfall in New South Wales had occurred in the town of Hay on 24 July 1936, just 90 metres (300 ft) above sea level in the far west of the state.

In Sydney, 'snow' was last alleged on 28 June 1836, where British settlers in Hyde Park claimed to have woken up to "snow nearly 1 in (2.5 cm) deep" – However, after a fall of graupel in July 2008, the Bureau of Meteorology had doubted the 1836 'snow' account, stating that observers in that era lacked the technology to distinguish snow from soft hail. Furthermore, melting snow (or sleet) was observed in the Sydney area in 1951 and 1986, though the Bureau also doubted those events had 'true' snow.

== See also ==
- Skiing in Australia
- Climate of Australia
- Weather extremes in Australia
- Effects of the El Niño–Southern Oscillation in Australia
- Geography of Australia
