= 1992 Queensland storms =

Series of thunderstorms in Queensland

Meteorological history
- Duration: 29 November 1992

Tornado outbreak
- Tornadoes: 2
- Max. rating: F4 tornado
- Duration: Less than one hour

Overall effects
- Damage: Total unknown; millions (A$) in crop damage
- Areas affected: Queensland, Australia

A series of destructive severe thunderstorms struck southeastern Queensland, Australia, on 29 November 1992. The storms produced strong winds, flash flooding and large hailstones in the region, including the capital city of Brisbane. The storms also spawned two of the most powerful tornadoes recorded in Australia, including the only Australian tornado to be given an official 'F4' classification on the Fujita scale and the last violent tornado in Australia until 21 March 2013.

The meteorological instability in the region resulted in the formation of at least five supercell thunderstorms in the space of around three hours. The storms, which spawned progressively further up the coast from Brisbane to Gladstone as the afternoon progressed, left a trail of damage resulting from hail, rain and wind. The event has been described as "one of the most widespread outbreaks of severe thunderstorms recorded" by veteran meteorologist Richard Whitaker.

== Climatology and conditions ==
November is traditionally the start of the thunderstorm season along the eastern seaboard of Australia, with a rise in average humidity and warmer ground temperatures combining with more frequent occurrences of cool air in the upper atmosphere. These conditions are conducive for producing severe thunderstorms, particularly those which feature hail.

The conditions on Sunday, 29 November were extremely unsettled. There were a series of thunderstorm cells that formed early in the morning – despite it being more common for thunderstorms to form in the late afternoon in the south-east Queensland region. These storms, which had periodic bursts of severe lightning, cleared quickly.

Thunderstorms began to form again just before midday, as the hot and humid conditions became more acute in the middle part of the day. The Bureau of Meteorology radar picked up a series of cells to the north-west of Brisbane, the capital of Queensland, and the data suggested that there was a possibility of large hail. The Bureau immediately issued a Severe Thunderstorm Warning for the coastal region between Brisbane and the Sunshine Coast, 100 km to the north.

The main cell in the thunderstorm system appeared from Bureau of Meteorology radar analysis to split into two separate and distinct cells. This development resulted in one part of the major storm to head north, to Maroochydore, while the other part headed south towards Brisbane. The southern cell struck Brisbane just after 1:00pm, with intense lightning activity and hailstones the size of marbles falling. The storm caused a lengthy delay during the First Test of the series between Australia and the West Indies, when hail forced play to be stopped at the Brisbane Cricket Ground around 1:15pm.

The northern cell continued to intensify throughout the afternoon. The Bureau of Meteorology then recognised it as a supercell, which often bring erratic developments and often last for long periods of time. The storm dropped hailstones which were between eight and ten centimeters around Maroochydore, on the Sunshine Coast, damaging the roofs of around 80 houses in the area. The hail also damaged aircraft at a local airport and dented cars, as well as inflicting injuries to a handful of swimmers at beaches near Maroochydore.

== Tornadoes ==
Confirmed tornadoes by Fujita rating
FU	F0	F1	F2	F3	F4	F5	Total
0	0	0	0	1	1	0	2

The extreme instability in this area caused at least three more severe supercells in the region. Two separate cells both produced a tornado that were recorded as two of the most powerful in Australian history. The third supercell, which formed just after 3:00pm (immediately after the two tornadoes) near Gladstone, produced golf ball-sized hail that caused crop damage around Gladstone. The total damage to crops from the event was placed in the millions (A$).

=== Oakhurst, Queensland ===
Oakhurst, Queensland
F3 tornado
- on the Fujita scale

Early in the afternoon, another supercell developed around the town of Maryborough, around 300 km north of Brisbane. It developed rapidly also, and at 2:30pm a number of reports sent to the Bureau of Meteorology reported that this intense tornado touched down in Oakhurst, a rural area 10 km west of Maryborough. However, due to the low population density in the area the reported damage was sparse, with one house destroyed, several others unroofed and hundreds of trees were snapped.

Upon investigation and analysis of measurements and the damage caused by the tornado, it was given a rating of 'F3' on the Fujita scale. This was one of the most powerful tornadoes ever recorded in Australia, and the scale indicated the tornado may have produced winds of between 252 and 300 kilometres per hour.

=== Bucca, Queensland ===
Bucca, Queensland
F4 tornado
- on the Fujita scale

Only minutes after the F3 tornado in Oakhurst, another supercell developed to the south-west of Bundaberg, around 400 km north of Brisbane and 150 km north of the F3 tornado. It strengthened and moved in a north-east direction, causing severe damage to Bullyard and Bucca areas with giant hailstones, described as the size of a "cricket ball".

The supercell then spawned this violent and significant tornado in the Bucca and Kolan area. According to reports by meteorologists, the tornado was so strong and the effects caused on the area it hit were so extreme that household appliances were displaced, small objects were embedded in trees and house walls, and "a 3-tonne truck body was carried 300 metres across the ground". However, as with Oakhurst, the rural nature of the area affected limited the damage caused by the tornado.

Examination by a severe weather team from the Bureau of Meteorology examined the damage in the Bucca and Kolan region and recorded it as an 'F4' on the Fujita scale. This corresponds to the tornado being able to produce winds between 331 and 417 kilometres per hour and of 'devastating' intensity. This is the first tornado ever to be recorded as an F4 in Australian history, and the first violent tornado in the country since 1876.

== See also ==
- List of Australian tornadoes
- 1876 Bowen tornado - the strongest tornado in Australian history
- Bulahdelah tornado - another intense tornado in New South Wales
