= List of Australian tornadoes =

Australia experiences approximately 30 to 80 tornadoes annually, as estimated by the Bureau of Meteorology (BoM). The earliest recorded signs of tornado activity date back to 1785, during the country's early settlement period.

== Climatology and background ==
A tornado, also known as a twister or willy-willy in Australia, is a violently rotating column of air that descends to the ground and can be among the most destructive atmospheric phenomena. The earliest recorded tornado in Australia occurred in Sydney, 1795. Tornadoes in Australia are measured in intensity using the EF-Scale (Enhanced Fujita scale).

== Events ==
=== Pre-1900 ===
Tornado event	Date	Area	Tornadoes	Casualties	Notes	Intensity
1795 Sydney tornado	1795	Sydney	1	0	The earliest tornado record in the Bureau of Meteorology archives, it destroyed crops and trees in the early settlement.	
Port Phillip tornado	29 January 1837	Central Victoria	1	0	Believed to be the first tornado observed by the colonists of Port Phillip (and in Australia in general). Following a trail of over 60 miles from the heads of Port Phillip to Geelong and as far north as Mount Macedon, it caused much damage and uprooting of trees.	
Parramatta tornado	21 December 1841	Parramatta, New South Wales	1	0	Tornado observed west of Sydney that caused damage to churches and schools in Parramatta, destroying homes and uprooting trees.	
Murrumbidgee tornado	9 October 1844	Murrumbidgee District, New South Wales	1	0	Part of a larger storm cell which caused extensive flooding. A tornado was observed in Murrumbidgee District near Gundagai, causing extensive damage to forest area.	
Devil's river tornado	26 December 1848	Devil's River, Victoria	1	0 fatalities, 3 injured	Tornado swept across farmland whilst hurling large hailstones, killing numerous livestock and injuring settlers.	
Wee Waa tornado	26 November 1849	Wee Waa, New South Wales	1	0	Huts had their roofs removed; there were trees uprooted.	
Campbell's river tornado	5 January 1852	Campbell's River, New South Wales	1	0	This destructive tornado cut a path through farmland and forest, reaching the outskirts of Bathurst, New South Wales.	
Waratah tornado	16 September 1860	Newcastle region	1	0	Related to storm over Newcastle, this tornado cut a path from Minmi to Hexham and Waratah, throwing wagons through the air and uprooting trees on its way toward the ocean.	
Chetwynd tornado	1 July 1861	Western Victoria	1	1 reported	A large tornado was reported at Chetwynd Station moving along the tributary of the Glenelg River toward Harrow. It carried large objects including trees, poles, and huts to distances from several yards to miles through the air. Two men were reported to have been thrown great distances in the air; one was reported to hit the ground and was dead on impact.	
Hamilton tornado	22 October 1861	Western Victoria	1	0	Originating near the South Australian border at Lindsay and passing through Casterton, a tornado cut a path through Hamilton, where it caused extensive damage to buildings before moving east and uprooting trees and taking the roofs off houses. A Scotch church in Hamilton was destroyed, along with another church, and several commercial premises- including two hotels- were leveled, causing A£5000 in damage. No casualties were reported.	
Maryborough tornado	25 February 1864	North-west Victoria	1	2 fatalities, numerous injuries	A tornado cut a swathe from Maryborough to Creswick and Bullarook, north of Ballarat. A father and his son were killed by a tree thrown through the air, and numerous others were injured. The tornado damaged numerous buildings and uprooted trees.	
Beechworth tornado	26 October 1865	Beechworth	1	1	Massive damage to Beechworth from tornado, leaving churches and schools demolished, houses without roofs, and objects thrown great distances. A Chinese man died when the hut he was inside had collapsed on him.	
Bowen tornado	16 February 1876	Bowen, Queensland	1	1 fatality, numerous injuries	A destructive tornado caused severe damage to Bowen. One was killed, and many more were injured (some injuries were serious). The damages amounted to at least A£7,000. Many buildings were severely damaged or destroyed, including the Bowen hospital, where many patients sustained minor injuries.	F5, rating disputed
Nhill tornado	19 November 1897	Wimmera region, north western Victoria	1	3	A deadly tornado left a destructive trail across over 250 km of northwestern Victoria. It virtually destroyed the town of Nhill, where A£50,000 of damage was reported. All of the town's churches and many of the houses were destroyed. Extensive damage was also inflicted on the town of Donald, where one person died and a church, a school, and numerous other buildings were demolished. The total damage bill was A£4,000 in that town. At Maryborough, a further 2 deaths were recorded. At Rupanyup, the damage was estimated at A£200.	F4+
Nevertire tornado	29 December 1897	New South Wales	1	Numerous injuries	A destructive tornado with a path 14 miles long struck the town of Nevertire, leaving many people injured.	

=== 1900s ===
Tornado event	Date	Area	Tornadoes	Casualties	Notes	Intensity
Narrabri tornado	2 December 1900	New South Wales	1	0	A destructive tornado caused total estimated damage of A£8,000.	
Narrabri tornado	6 January 1902	New South Wales	1	1 fatality, numerous injured	A second and more destructive tornado at Narrabri destroyed a railway goods shed. Only a few buildings were undamaged. The estimated total damage was A£10,000.	
Ballarat tornado	19 August 1909	Victoria	1	1 fatality, >7 injured	During a severe flooding event, a tornado touched down in Ballarat, sweeping across the city's northern and eastern suburbs, destroying numerous homes in Ballarat North, Soldiers Hill, Black Hill and Ballarat East. The tornado lifted before touching down again at Eureka, where it destroyed more homes before dissipating.	
Marong tornado	27 September 1911	Victoria	1	1 fatality, >12 injured	This tornado caused severe damage to Marong and Lockwood. This is the first tornado photographed in Australia. It was officially rated as F2 on the Severe Storms Archive, but it is believed to be a violent tornado that is at least F4 strength.	F2
Brighton tornado	2 February 1918	Victoria	3	>2 fatalities, many injuries	Known as the 'Brighton Cyclone', these tornadoes hit Brighton, a suburb of Melbourne. At one location two tornado tracks crossed, creating (in the language of the day) a "veritable orgy of destruction". In the few minutes that the storm lasted, two people were killed and many others were injured. Wind speeds were estimated at 320 km/h, making this possibly the most intense tornado to hit a major Australian city. Total estimated damage was A£100,000 – 150,000.	F3 (strongest tornado)
Portarlington tornado	9 January 1921	Victoria	2	0 fatalities, >1 injuries	A tornado and a waterspout formed in the area of Corio Bay, moving east where it struck Portarlington and St Leonards before dissipating in Port Phillip. The Grand Hotel was damaged, and roofs were removed from a church and several houses. Trees were torn out of the ground, and there were reports of several people being carried up to 40 feet in the air.	
Geelong tornado	22 July 1926	Victoria	1	1 fatality, 20-30 injured	A tornado that originated in the Western District moved east, striking Lismore in South West of Victoria, where there was considerable damage and trees torn out of the ground. Headed east, the tornado cut a swathe through the southwest of Victoria until it reached the populated area of Geelong. It cut a path through the southern suburbs of Highton, where two churches, two halls, and two houses were destroyed among other buildings; Marshall; and Belmont, where a total of seven homes were destroyed. Total estimated damage in Geelong was A£40,000.	
Dwellingup tornado	16 April 1954	Western Australia	1	0 fatalities	This tornado tore through the Jarrah forest along a 10 km (6.2 mi) path. The tornado was reported to be 200 m (660 ft) wide near Lyalls Mill.	F3
Port Macquarie tornado	6 July 1962	New South Wales	1	3 fatalities	An intense waterspout reached landfall at Port Macquarie causing widespread damage. 3 men were killed as a house collapsed on them.	
Busselton tornado	10 July 1964	Western Australia	1	1 fatality	1 person was killed when his car was pulled off the road by a tornado near Busselton.	
Bulahdelah tornado	1 January 1970	New South Wales	1	0 fatalities	Believed to be one of the strongest Australian tornadoes, this tornado left a 21 km (13 mi) long and 1.6 km (0.99 mi) wide destruction path through the Bulahdelah State Forest. According to reports, it threw a two-ton tractor 100 m (330 ft) through the air, stripped it down to frame and deposited it upside down. It is estimated that the tornado destroyed over one million trees.	F5 (Unofficial)
Kin Kin tornado	14 August 1971	Queensland	1	3 fatalities	Three people were killed at Kin Kin (a small community between Gympie and Noosa). It is believed to be the deadliest tornado in Australian history.	
Brisbane tornado	4 November 1973	Queensland	1, other funnels reported	0 fatalities, 20 injuries	Believed to be the most destructive Australian tornado, this funnel had a path length of 51 km (32 mi), and peak wind-speeds were estimated to be in excess of 300 km/h (190 mph). 500 houses had their roofs removed, 1,400 more were destroyed, and 500 were declared structurally unsafe. At least one home was partially swept clean from its foundation.	F3
Port Hedland tornado	17 December 1975	Western Australia	1	0 fatalities	A spectacular tornado with a purple funnel was on the ground in front of the weather bureau.	
Sandon tornado	13 November 1976	Victoria	3	2 fatalities	Two fatalities occurred when a car with occupants inside was thrown by the tornado. This tornado from the outbreak caused $300,000 in damage.	F2/F3
Northam tornado	21 December 1977	Western Australia	1	0 fatalities	Described as "the most beautiful Australian tornado" due to the colour of the vortex being red from picking up the red-coloured dirt, this tornado made a path 6–7 km long and uprooted several large gum trees.	
Drummoyne and Hunters Hill tornado	10 February 1978	New South Wales	1	0 fatalities, 8 injuries	During an outbreak of severe thunderstorms in eastern New South Wales affecting Newcastle Sydney and Wollongong, a storm produced a tornado in the Drummoyne and Hunters Hill area of metropolitan Sydney, ripping the roof from a house. The severe weather injured a total of eight across the affected area, causing an estimated A$15 million in damage with a 2011 normalized cost of A$215 million.	
Port Macquarie Tornado	13 September 1985	New South Wales	1	–	Buildings were destroyed and cars were thrown through the air, causing a total of more than A$3 million in damages.	
Elsmore tornadoes	6 November 1989	Elsmore, New South Wales	3	-	A destructive tornado damaged up to 25 homes; five were completely destroyed.	F3
SE QLD tornadoes	24 December 1989	South East Queensland	>1	-	A massive supercell with cloud tops as high as 77,000 ft (23 km) tore through Brisbane and parts of Southeast Queensland, producing several tornadoes along its path. A combination of straight line winds and a tornado ripped the roofs from 500 houses, damaged 1000 houses, and left 12 structurally unsafe in the city of Redcliffe (approximately 25 km (16 mi) north of Brisbane).	
Chisholm Tornado	13 January 1990	Australian Capital Territory	1	0 fatalities, 5 injuries	A tornado hit Canberra (a suburb of Chisholm), destroying a wooden church and damaging 37 houses.	
SE QLD tornadoes	29 November 1992	Queensland,	2	0 fatalities	The tornado at Bucca (west of Bundaberg) is known as the official most intense Australian tornado for its extreme structural damage near Bucca. Hail the size of cricket balls accompanied the storm. A tornado also struck Oakhurst.	F4 and F3
Tucabia tornado	1 November 1993	New South Wales	1	0 fatalities, 2 injuries	This tornado had a 200m base and was accompanied by golf ball sized hail and lasted for 20 minutes. 8 houses were destroyed while 35 others were damaged. 2 people were injured.	F2
Blue Mountains tornado	20 November 1994	New South Wales	1	0	This tornado hit Yellow Rock in the Blue Mountains, causing destruction to multiple houses. Trees were uprooted.	F0/F1
Chatswood tornado	20 November 1994	New South Wales	1	0	This tornado hit Chatswood (north of Sydney). Multiple houses were destroyed, and trees were uprooted.	F0/F1
Merimbula tornado	16 April 1995	New South Wales	2	0 fatalities, 34 injuries	Two funnels were reported with this storm. One tornado ripped through the center of the town of Merimbula in SE New South Wales. 34 people were injured and approximately 200 buildings were damaged (12 were destroyed). Another tornado caused damage at Pambula (which was nearby).	F2
New South Wales tornado outbreak	29 September 1996	Central New South Wales	3 confirmed	0 fatalities	The largest outbreak of severe thunderstorms ever documented in New South Wales was reported to produce three tornadoes, hail up to 7 cm, and wind gusts to 156 km/h. Over A$92 million insured loss from hail and wind is sustained at Armidale. Total estimated cost for the region is A$340 million. 3 tornadoes were confirmed in the towns of Bundella, Gilgandra, and Elong Elong.	
Perth tornado	15 July 1996	Western Australia	1	0 fatalities, 5 injuries	This short-lived tornado was associated with a cold front. The tornado's speed was estimated to have been 80 km/h (50 mph), and its path was approximately 4 km (2.5 mi) long and 40 m (130 ft) wide. The tornado lasted on the ground for approximately 3 minutes.	
Fremantle tornado	25 August 1999	Western Australia	1	0	A tornado went through Fremantle (south of Perth), leaving a 100 m (330 ft) wide, 8–9 km (5.0–5.6 mi) long track. Several people were trapped in an apartment block when the tornado caused the roof to collapse.	

=== 2000s ===
Tornado event	Date	Area	Tornadoes	Casualties	Notes	Intensity
Greystanes tornado	3 November 2000	New South Wales	3 Confirmed	0 fatalities	A tornadic thunderstorm moved through the Sydney Metropolitan Area over the afternoon/early evening. Three tornadoes struck several suburbs, including Constitution Hill, Wentworthville, Pendle Hill, and Greystanes. Golf ball-sized hail and widespread downing of trees and overhead power lines were observed during the damage survey as was minor to moderate structural damage.	All F0/F1
South coast tornado	26 December 2001	Off the south coast of New South Wales, Australia	1	0 fatalities	During the Sydney to Hobart Yacht Race, the boat Nicorette recorded wind speeds of close to 100 kn (120 mph) and was struck by hail the size of golf balls. According to the boat's meteorologist, the tornado began with a diameter of around 50 m (160 ft), but grew to 500 m (1,600 ft).	
South Australia tornado outbreak	18 May 2002	South Australia	2	0 fatalities	Two tornadoes associated with a strong cold front occurred in the morning. The first tornado, at 6:15 am (ACST), near Coulta (7 km (4.3 mi) in length), uprooted several trees and damaged others on farmland. The second, at 10 am (ACST), caused a narrow 2 km (1.2 mi) long path of damage through the Adelaide suburbs of Rosslyn Park and Wattle Park. In the evening, another tornado or severe down-burst associated with a hail storm occurred at Two Wells, causing a damage path of less than 500 m (1,600 ft) in length.	
Niangala tornado	13 October 2002	New South Wales	1	0 fatalities	A tornado in Niangala damaged hundreds of trees and destroyed two houses. Nearby, hail up to 6 cm (2.4 in) was recorded at Walcha.	F2
Bendigo tornado	18 May 2003	Victoria	1	0 fatalities	A tornado caused considerable damage within the City of Bendigo, Victoria, damaging around 50 homes.	
Grampians tornado	4 January 2004	Victoria	1	0 fatalities	A tornado caused considerable damage along a wide track within the Grampains National Park in western Victoria. The tornado track was observed from an aircraft about a week later. The tornado tore large trees out of the ground, leaving a bare patch of about 8–10 ha (20–25 acres) without any vegetation at all.	
Noble Park tornado	9 June 2004	Victoria	1	0 fatalities	A tornado caused considerable damage along a damage path 3.2 kilometres (2.0 mi) long and from 50–200 m (160–660 ft) wide. More than 70 homes in the Melbourne suburbs of Noble Park and Mulgrave were affected. Winds were estimated to be up to 180 km/h (110 mph).	F1
Coonabarabran tornado	20 January 2005	New South Wales	1	0 fatalities	This tornado formed at 4:30pm (AEDT) during a severe thunderstorm and ran a path of over 5 km (3.1 mi) towards the southeast, crossing the Oxley Highway, where it uprooted many trees adjacent to the highway and scoured the ground.	F1/F2
Broken Hill tornado	6 November 2005	New South Wales	1	0 fatalities	This tornado damaged 100 homes, leading to a total damage bill of A$3.8 million.	
Lake Bolac tornado	19 January 2006	Victoria	1	0 fatalities	A small tornado struck Lake Bolac around 11:00pm, uprooting at least 100 trees and causing damage to eight grain silos, leaving a total damage cost of around $2 million AUD.	
La Perouse tornado	4 August 2006	New South Wales	1	0 fatalities	A super cellular waterspout/tornado struck the Sydney suburb of La Perouse. It caused damage to several buildings and brought down powerlines.	F1
Leschenault tornado	7 August 2006	Western Australia	1	2 injuries	This tornado hit an outer suburb of Bunbury (163 km (101 mi) south of Perth) in the early hours of the morning. It damaged sixty houses, with seven of these completely losing their roofs. The tornado injured two and produced a damage path 200 metres wide and 2 kilometres long.	F2
Kakadu tornado	1 March 2007	Northern Territory	1	0 fatalities	Severe damage was observed in Kakadu National Park at the Mary River Ranger Station. Two caravans were destroyed, and many eucalypts and ironwoods were uprooted. The Bureau of Meteorology experts estimated the wind speeds to be between 230–270 km/h (140–170 mph).	F2/F3
You Yangs landspout	14 May 2007	Victoria	1	0 fatalities	A landspoutwas sighted near the You Yangs near Geelong, Victoria. The tornado lasted for several minutes as it traversed across farmland and had an estimated diameter of 50–100 m (160–330 ft). No damage was reported.	
Moana tornado	21 May 2007	South Australia	1	0 fatalities	Several houses were damaged and trees were blown down or snapped at Moana.	
Dunoon tornado	26 October 2007	New South Wales	1	0 fatalities	A multi-vortex tornado was caught by storm chaser Jimmy Deguara near the town of Lismore,. The tornado blew out the walls of a church and tore the roofs off about 20 residences. A piece of debris hit a power sub-station that exploded, causing 3000 homes to be without power.	
"Ballarat" tornado	20 December 2007	Ballarat	1	0 fatalities	A large but brief tornado, part of a storm complex that affected Castlemaine, was in a rural area north of Ballarat. No damage was reported from this tornado. Footage and photographs were taken by storm chasers.	
Perth tornado	9 June 2008	Western Australia	1	0 fatalities	Confirmed by the Bureau of Meteorology, the tornado swept through the southern suburbs of Perth just after 7.30 (AWST) in the morning and damaged more than 130 homes. Residents from an aged care facility in Cooloongup were evacuated as the roof of an activity room was blown off. The hostel was without power or water.	
Nimmitabel tornado	23 December 2008	New South Wales	1	0 fatalities	A tornado occurred between Nimmitabel and Cooma with severe storms that affected the region.	

=== 2010s ===
Tornado event	Date	Area	Tornadoes	Casualties	Notes	Intensity
Atherton tornado	7 February 2010	Queensland	1	0 fatalities	A tornado struck a farm just south of the town of Atherton in Queensland, Australia, causing damage to corn fields and farm equipment.	
Lennox Head waterspout/tornado	3 June 2010	New South Wales	2	0 fatalities, multiple injuries	A major storm and waterspout/tornado destroyed homes and caused multiple injuries at Lennox Head. Police say a number of homes have been destroyed, some powerlines were down, and several caravans have been overturned. Paramedics say that several people have been injured in the storm, but nobody was missing.	
Trawalla tornado	30 July 2010	Victoria	1	0 fatalities	A tornado destroyed hundreds of trees and damaged power-lines at Trawalla (near Beaufort).	
Penola tornado	31 July 2010	South Australia	1	0 fatalities	A tornado ripped through the main street of Penola in southeast South Australia, destroying at least four buildings and damaging many others. No injuries were reported.	
Moama tornado	10 August 2010	New South Wales	1	0 fatalities	A weak tornado was observed in the town of Moama in southern New South Wales, causing some minor damage.	
Mackay Tornado	25 December 2010	Queensland	1	0 Fatalities	A funnel was sighted lowering down to the ocean, after making a touchdown on the water, it made its way west to the suburb of North Mackay, debris was strewn all across the suburb with considerable damage to roofs and sheds.	F1
Whitton tornado	1 February 2011	New South Wales	1	0 fatalities	A tornado struck the town, destroying a carport and damaging houses and trees.	
Yellow Water Billabong tornado	11 February 2011	Northern Territory	1	0 fatalities	Footage of a tornado over Yellow Water Billabong (located in the Kakadu National Park in the Northern Territory) was captured by a tour guide. There were no fatalities or injuries, and damage was limited to vegetation.	
Karratha tornado	21 February 2011	Western Australia	4	0 fatalities, 1 injury	The Karratha CBD was struck by a tornado, related to Tropical Cyclone Carlos. It reportedly uprooted large trees, tore roofs off of houses, and threw boats into the air. One person was injured by flying glass.	
Magpie Valley tornado	20 April 2011	Victoria	1	0 fatalities	A weak tornado was observed and photographed close to Ballarat's southeastern rural-urban fringe in the forestry area between Magpie and Sebastopol. No damage or injury was reported.	
Canning Vale tornado	20 May 2011	Western Australia	1	0 fatalities	Canning Vale, a southern suburb of Perth, was struck by a tornado, damaging a number of homes and one vehicle.	
Red Rock tornado	14 June 2011	New South Wales	1	0 fatalities	A waterspout/tornado removed the roof of at least two buildings, including the Bowling Club, and damaged several others in Red Rock.	
Bellbridge tornado	9 November 2011	Victoria	1	0 fatalities	A tornado hit the Bellbridge and Bethanga areas near Wodonga. Several homes were severely damaged, some having their roofs removed, and several trees were uprooted.	
Bacchus Marsh tornado	25 December 2011	Victoria	2+	0 fatalities	A tornado hit Fiskville (west of Bacchus Marsh), Victoria. A second tornado was reported at Melton from the same storm. Tennis-ball sized hail and flash flooding also occurred with the storms, leaving an estimated damage bill in the millions of Australian dollars.	
Bredbo tornado	20 January 2012	New South Wales	1	0 fatalities	A tornado hit Bredbo in the Snowy Mountains area of New South Wales.	
Townsville tornado	20 March 2012	Queensland	1	0 fatalities	A tornado caused major structural and tree damage in the suburb of Vincent. Wind speeds were estimated at 160–200 km/h (99–124 mph) from damage analysis. Other suburbs affected were Garbutt, Gulliver, Aitkenvale, and Annandale.	
Black Range tornado	31 May 2012	Victoria	1	0 fatalities	A tornado struck the Black Range (near Stawell), causing minor structural and tree damage.	
Perth tornado outbreak	7 June 2012	Western Australia	2-3	0 fatalities	Tornadoes struck the Perth suburbs of Dianella and Morley, damaging homes, trees, and power lines. Light Street and Marmion Street in Dianella suffered the worst damage. Winds were measured at 180 km/h (110 mph). A tornado also struck York, 100 km (62 mi) east of Perth. A total of 100 homes and buildings were damaged.	F1
Southern Tasmania tornado outbreak	9 November 2012	Tasmania	2+	0 fatalities	Tornadoes were reported on Mount Wellington and Sorell.	
Cyclone Oswald tornado outbreak	26–27 January 2013	Queensland	>6	>20 injured	Several tornadoes struck the Bundaberg region of Central Queensland on 26 January, associated with the remnants of Cyclone Oswald. The first struck Bargara at 1.00pm (AEST), tearing roofs from buildings, and injuring at least six people. Burnett Heads was struck by three separate tornadoes, at 3.15pm, 6.05pm, and 6.30pm. Another tornado crossed the coast at Coonar. A sixth tornado occurred at Burrum Heads on 27 January.	F3 (strongest tornado)
Ballarat tornado	31 January 2013	Ballarat, Victoria	1	0	A small tornado swept through parts of Ballarat. Starting in Ballarat North, where it caused the most damage, it rounded Black Hill, briefly crossing the CBD before sweeping across Ballarat East and continuing to Eureka in the east of the city. The tornado caused extensive and localized minor damage to houses and buildings, tearing away roofs, fences, and garages, smashing windows, uprooting trees, destroying chimneys, cutting power to parts of the CBD, and deactivating traffic lights. Wind gusts of over 80 km/h (50 mph) were recorded.	F1
Sydney-Illawarra Tornado Outbreak	23–24 February 2013	New South Wales	8	0	A tornado with winds of up to 135 km/h (84 mph) was observed in Sydney's inner east causing extensive damage at Kirribilli. Damage was also observed at Chifley, Malabar and Randwick. The damage was most severe at Kirribilli, where it removed roofs from houses, uprooted trees, and damaged the Westpac bank and the Sydney Flying Squadron. Several tornadoes struck the Illawarra region south of Sydney, New South Wales. Tornadoes occurred at Kiama, Seven Mile Beach to Nowra (with wind speeds of up to 200 km/h (120 mph)), Jamberoo, and Albion Park Rail. The tornado at Kiama caused significant damage to homes. Post-event analysis confirmed 8 tornadoes, with 2 rated F0, 5 at F1 and 1 rated as F2.	2 F0's, 5 F1, 1 F2
Eastern Victoria tornado outbreak	21 March 2013	North-eastern Victoria and southern New South Wales	7	>20 injured	A total of 7 tornadoes touched down, one tornado struck the towns of Koonoomoo, Cobram, Barooga, Mulwala, Yarrawonga, and Bundalong. A second tornado from the same storm was reported at Rutherglen between 6:50-8:30pm (AEDT). A tornado struck the towns of Tamleugh, Euroa and Swanpool. Twenty people sustained injuries requiring hospitalisation, with one in a serious condition and two in a critical but stable condition. Roofs were ripped off homes, caravans upturned, the Barooga Post Office was heavily damaged and a petrol station was damaged at Euroa. The initial tornado, which caused most of its devastation in Mulwala, is believed to have been the most powerful tornado to have ever hit Victoria, with an unofficial rating of F4 or higher. The tornado was only rated an F3 however. Further tornadoes touched down near Kerang, Benalla, and two near Mansfield.	F0, F1, F3, F4 (Unofficially)
Ararat tornado	22 October 2013	Ararat, Victoria	1	0	A large storm cell over much of the state spawned what were likely short-lived tornadoes in Ararat and Barnawartha in the state's north. In Ararat, a storage building was completely destroyed; several other buildings were damaged, including a hardware store; and numerous homes sustained damage to roofs. Several trees were snapped or uprooted and sheds and fences were levelled in a 500-metre damage path, mainly along McLellan Street. The Bureau of Meteorology described the phenomenon as "either tornadoes or microbursts."	F1
Hornsby CBD tornado (The Hornado)	18 November 2013	Hornsby, New South Wales	1	0 fatalities, 12 injured	Twelve people were injured by a tornado that struck the CBD area of Hornsby, New South Wales in northwestern Sydney. The Bureau of Meteorology confirmed the tornado event and they believe that it may have started as a waterspout that was sighted at offshore Manly at 2:15pm, weakening overland before intensifying and forming a tornado over Hornsby CBD at 2:46pm. Car dashcam footage captured the tornado as it crossed George Street from the Westfield Hornsby shopping centre across to the railway station. Locals dubbed the event 'The Hornado'.	F1
New England tornadoes	23 November 2013	New South Wales	6	0	Up to four tornadoes were suspected to have touched down in the New England region. One tornado had a 100–200 m (330–660 ft) wide path and estimated winds of 160 km/h (99 mph) near Tenterden, New South Wales. It destroyed a home, caused extensive damage to property, and uprooted trees. Storm chasers captured photographs and video footage of the tornado as it touched down from a wall cloud near BenLomond. Six tornadoes of F0 to F1 intensity were confirmed.	F0/F1
Pakenham tornado	14 June 2014	Victoria	1	0	A tornado was filmed as it roped out at Pakenham (south east of Melbourne) at around midday on Saturday, 14 June 2014.	F0
Perth Metro Tornadoes	14 July 2014	Western Australia	2-4	2 fatalities	As many as four tornadoes impacted the metropolitan area around Perth. A confirmed tornado caused significant damage to properties in Hilton and O'Connor, removing entire sections of roof structures to family homes, snapping wooden power poles, and downing trees. Another tornado was confirmed to have damaged homes and downed trees in Claremont. A third tornado is suspected to have been the cause of damage in Beeliar. Further south at Yallingup it is suspected that fourth tornado is responsible for damage, including downed trees. Two men with muscular dystrophy died in Beaconsfield when the power was cut to the home they shared as they slept. Their life support relied on electricity to function, therefore it stopped working during the power outage, leaving the men to die.	F2
Forrestfield tornado	7 September 2014	Western Australia	1	0	It was reported that the Bureau of Meteorology thought it was likely that a tornado had caused damage in Forrestfield. Later, the Bureau concluded, "Given the damage path, it is likely that a tornado moved through Forrestfield (suburb, southeast of Perth)." The damage to Forrestfield included fallen trees, damaged roofs, and downed light poles.	F0
Round Hill tornado	28 July 2014	Tasmania	1	0	A tornado destroyed trees and extensively damaged homes and businesses at Round Hill near Burnie, around 5.45 pm (AEST). Pictures show tree trunks snapped off metres from the ground and buildings with roof structures completely removed, some with masonry walls beginning to crumble. A single dark, grainy photo of the tornado was shared with local media.	F1
Gol Gol tornado	22 November 2014	New South Wales and Victoria	1	0	A tornado carved a path of destruction north of Gol Gol at around 5:00 pm on Saturday 22 November 2014. Affecting over 100 rural properties, the tornado caused over $12 million of damage. Crop damage included over 1000 hectares of table and wine grapes, 790 hectares of citrus, and combined 40 hectares of eggplants, capsicums and melons. The Bureau of Meteorology concluded a tornado spawned by a supercell thunderstorm had left a band of damage from Yelta, Victoria to north of Gol Gol in southwest New South Wales. The damage path was estimated at 20 kilometres in length and possibly up to 2 km wide, along which the tornado had uprooted and snapped trees, damaged vineyards, and ripped roofs off of houses and sheds.	F1
Bombala tornado	24 January 2015	New South Wales	1	0	A tornado impacted the New South Wales town of Bombala on Saturday, 24 January 2015, leaving damage to roofs, sheds, and scattering debris across the town. It was witnessed by locals and filmed by one.	F0
Creswick tornado	13 February 2015	Victoria	1	0	A tornado was filmed northwest of Creswick, Victoria.	F0
Pokolbin tornado	15 February 2015	Hunter Valley, New South Wales	1	0	A tornado left a trail of destruction through a Pokolbin winery. First noticed at 3.30 pm, it went on to destroy a shed and around 150 vines. The tornado was filmed by a witness as it progressed.	F0
Shepparton tornado	23 February 2015	Victoria	1	0	A tornado was reported west of the Victorian town of Shepparton.	F0
Daylesford tornado	28 February 2015	Victoria	1	0	A tornado tore from Eganstown to Daylesford downing hundreds of trees along a 2 kilometres (1.2 mi) path approximately 150 metres (490 ft) wide.	F1
Karratha tornado	1 May 2015	Western Australia		0	A tornado, associated with the rainbands of TC Quang, was filmed near Karratha. (The video was supplied to the Bureau of Meteorology, so it is not publicly available.)	F0
Grafton tornado	13 June 2015	New South Wales	1	0	A tornado was photographed near Fisher Park in Grafton at around 2.00 pm AEST on Saturday, 13 June 2015.	F0
Quambone tornado	11 July 2015	New South Wales	1	0	A tornado impacted the areas of Quambone, Gulargambone, and Armatree on 11 July 2015. The tornado had a width of about 100–200 metres (330–660 ft). A family's homestead on the Gulargambone property "Eureka" had its roof structure removed and its exterior walls began to disintegrate	F2
Burrumbuttock tornado	11 July 2015	New South Wales	1	0	A tornado damaged homes at Burrumbuttock. It was photographed by a resident after it had impacted their home.	F0
Lake Hume tornado-waterspout	24 July 2015	Victoria	1	0	A waterspout was filmed on Lake Hume as a tornadic thunderstorm passed over the lake.	F0
West Ulverstone tornado	10 August 2015	Tasmania	1	0	A small but damaging tornado went through the northwest Tasmanian town of Ulverstone on the evening of 10 August 2015. Roofs were ripped from houses, the local Lions club, and a strip mall and trees were brought down.	F0
Dubbo tornado	24 August 2015	New South Wales	1	0	On the evening of 24 August 2015 a tornado impacted the semi rural suburbs east of Dubbo, NSW. As it progressed it was filmed across its approximately 15 minute life span. The tornado touched down near Mugga Hill, damaging homes on Acacia Road, Whitehwood Road, Pinedale Road, and Debeuafort Drive. The tornado rolled a truck and completely destroyed sheds.	F1
Usher tornado	29 August 2015	Western Australia	1	0	A weak tornado was filmed on 29 August 2015 as it impacted the Bunbury suburb of Usher. It left a narrow swathe of damage around 700 metres (2,300 ft) long, occurring at about 1.00 pm AWST.	F0
Cranbrook tornado	10 September 2015	Western Australia	1	0	A small tornado passed through the Shire of Cranbrook on 10 September 2015. The tornado was associated with the passage of a cold front. The Bureau of Meteorology commented that the damage observed was consistent with the passage of a tornado on the leading edge of the front.	F0
Upper Caboolture tornado	29 September 2015	Queensland	1	0	A funnel cloud was photographed at Upper Caboolture on 29 September 2015. Separate footage shows dust being blown up by the circulation, while damage was reported to a roof and a trampoline was tossed.	F0
Darling Downs, tornadoes	14 October 2015	Queensland	2	0	Weak tornadoes were photographed at Highfields and Dalby in Queensland's Darling Downs.	F0
Bundella tornado	22 October 2015	New South Wales	1	0	A tornado was photographed at Bundella in the North West Slopes and Plains Forecast District of New South Wales.	F0
Merrywinebone tornado	27 October 2015	New South Wales	1	0	A tornado was observed and photographed at Merrywinebone, New South Wales.	F0
Echuca tornado	31 October 2015	Victoria	1	0	A photo of a funnel cloud associated with a left-moving storm causing multiple reports of severe phenomena west of Echuca was supplied to the Bureau of Meteorology.	F0
Northern Victoria tornado	1 November 2015	Nathalia, Strathmerton, Torrumburry, and Cobram, Victoria	1	0	A significant tornado left a damage path approximately 45 kilometres (28 mi) long, with damage reports in Nathalia, Strathmerton, Torrumburry, and Cobram. The Bureau of Meteorology noted that the tornado filmed "corresponds to the inflexion point of the squall line on RADAR. Storms developed into a squall line over northern Victoria/Southern NSW which moved into the NE during the afternoon with multiple reports of wind damage. Doppler RADAR showed winds up to 130km/h at 3500ft along back edge of squall line" in the tornado record for this event. Homes were stripped of their roofs and some were designated as uninhabitable. At Torrumburry, a tornado brought down trees and ripped the tin roofing from a house, tearing away the battens to which it was attached. The tornado was filmed as it tore through Nathalia.	F2
Monarto Tornado	4 November 2015	South Australia	1	0	A tornado was identified in the Monarto area near Murray Bridge. No damage was reported.	F0
Melbourne Tornado	5 November 2015	Victoria	1	0	On the afternoon of Thursday, 5 November 2015, there were multiple reports of funnel clouds in the Greater Melbourne area. A storm spotter reported seeing two separate funnels touch down. A representative of the Bureau of Meteorology said the tornado struck Melbourne's outer northern suburbs of Tullamarine, Craigieburn, Campbellfield between 1:30 and 2:00 pm AEDT . The tornado was photographed near Melbourne Airport, Tullamarine.	F0
KCGM Super Pit Tornado	4 December 2015	Kalgoorlie-Boulder, Western Australia	1	4 injuries	At about 3:30 pm, "tornado-like conditions" swept through KCGM's mobile fleet maintenance workshops, causing major structural damage and cutting power, communication, and water services. The Bureau of Meteorology noted that "Kalgoorlie Doppler Radar image at 0725 UTC (1525 AWST) showed a pixel which had an inbound velocity of around 110 km/h at a height of ~487 metres above the ground (aliased: 22.5 m/s outbound)" in the tornado record for this event.	F0
Kurnell Tornado	16 December 2015	New South Wales	1	3 injuries	A single tornado started in southern Sydney with moderate destruction at Kurnell. Houses were destroyed, a roof was thrown 100 metres (330 ft), and multiple large trucks were overturned. The tornado headed out to sea and landed again at Bondi. The peak power approximately 2 km out to sea. 213 kilometres per hour (132 mph) winds were reported. These are possibly the most powerful winds recorded in New South Wales. In early 2016, the Insurance Council of Australia reported they had received 4282 claims with total insured losses of A$202 million from the tornado.	F2
Bathurst Tornado	16 December 2015	New South Wales	1	0	A single tornado was filmed and photographed in the Bathurst region.	F0
Bowenville Tornado	23 December 2015	Queensland	1	0	A tornado snapped at least 47 power poles, tore roofs from houses, downed trees, and damaged crops as it smashed parts of the Darling Downs. The tornado struck at about 7.30pm on Wednesday, 23 December 2015. Although the supercell thunderstorm and tornado produced significant damage, no injuries were reported.	F1
Mid North and Flinders Ranges Tornado Outbreak	28 September 2016	South Australia	7	0	On the afternoon of 28 September 2016, supercell thunderstorms developed across the Mid North and Flinders Ranges region with seven confirmed tornadoes. At approximately 2:50pm, there were reports, including photographic confirmation, of a tornado near Port Broughton. At approximately 3:30pm, there was damage consistent with a tornado at Crystal Brook, with significant damage to sheds and sporting facilities. From approximately 3:35-3:50pm, a tornado (F2) tracked 19 kilometres (12 mi) from the northwest of Blyth to the southeast, passing through the western edge of the town, leading to significant damage to a number of houses and the church. Two high-voltage power transmission towers were also downed. From 3:35-4:00pm, a tornado (F2) began near Survey Road, south of Melrose, then tracked for 23 kilometres (14 mi) across farmland to the southeast, affecting native vegetation and farm equipment. From 3:45-4:05pm a tornado (F2) tracked approximately 30 kilometres (19 mi) from the southern portion of Wilmington township, across farmland, to north of Booleroo Centre. Significant damage to sheds and farm equipment as well as the Wilmington Caravan Park was observed. At least one caravan was overturned and five high-voltage power transmission towers were downed. At approximately 4:00pm, two further tornadoes occurred at Andrews (north of Clare) and south of Mintaro (F1). The Andrews tornado also impacted a farm leading to damage to farm equipment. The Wilmington and Blyth tornadoes impacted on three separate high-voltage power lines, two southeast of Wilmington and one southeast of Blyth, causing multiple transmission tower failures, initiating a series of events on the power network that lead to a statewide blackout across South Australia.	F2 & F1
Broken Hill Tornado	11 November 2016	New South Wales	1	0	A tornado hit Broken Hill during major thunder storm. The only report of damage was a roof being ripped off of a home.	F0
Bentleigh Tornado	19 February 2017	Victoria	1	0	A tornado confirmed by Bureau of Meteorology formed during a storm, touching the ground at Bentleigh East, causing tiles to be removed from roofs. The funnel was photographed and observed by some to be "the width of a house."	
Brisbane Airport Tornado	17 March 2017	Brisbane, Queensland	3	0	This tornado (described by the media as a 'dust devil'), which was associated with a storm cell, was filmed crossing Brisbane Airport runways by witnesses, airport cameras, and a farm machinery operator filmed inside the eye. In the same storm cell, two waterspouts were filmed in Moreton Bay. Meteorologists confirmed a tornado, but no major damage occurred.	
Scarborough Waterspout	22 July 2017	Western Australia	Waterspout	0	A waterspout reported in Scarborough. made landfall with minor destruction.	F0
Perth Tornado	31 July 2017	Western Australia	1	0	The passage of a strong cold front produced a tornado in the Perth's north in the morning on 31 July 2017. The tornado moved through northern suburbs of Sorrento, Duncraig, Warwick, Hamersley and Balga, causing trees down and building damage.	F0
River Heads Tornado	1 October 2017	Bundaberg, Queensland	1	0	Tornado filmed at River Heads on Fraser Coast near Bundaberg left a 500 metres (1,600 ft) path of destruction, demolishing a house and a few sheds, uprooting trees, and causing significant damage to fences and roads. The cell moved at more than 80 kilometres per hour (50 mph) according to meteorology reports.	
Darling Downs Tornado	26 December 2017	Kingaroy, Queensland	1	0	A destructive tornado associated with a supercell tore roofs of homes in several towns across the Darling Downs on Boxing Day.	
Tansey and Coolabunia Tornadoes	12 October 2018	Tansey and Coolabunia, Queensland	2	Several injured, at least 3 hospitalised	Two tornadoes and large hail associated with a destructive super cell hit the towns of Tansey and Coolabunia in south-east Queensland at approximately 3pm on 12 October 2018. The tornadoes ripped roofs off houses, destroyed crops, uprooted trees and injured several people with at least 3 being hospitalised.	
Axe Creek Tornado	29 June 2019	Victoria	1	1 injured	A strong tornado associated with a cold front destroyed a single-story double-brick house in Axe Creek at approximately 4:30pm. An occupant of the house received a minor injury.	F2
Peechelba Tornado	6 September 2019	Victoria	1	Many livestock killed	A tornado caused property damage and loss of livestock at the town of Peechelba in Northern Victoria.	F1

=== 2020s ===
Tornado event	Date	Area	Tornadoes	Casualties	Notes	Intensity
Waurn Ponds Tornado	20 May 2020	Victoria	1	1 injured	A tornado passed through Waurn Ponds, Grovedale, Mount Duneed and Armstrong Creek on 20 May 2020, damaging at least 60 homes.	F1
Woodend tornado	13 August 2020	Victoria	1	0	A small and short-lived tornado formed in the outskirts of Woodend, north of Melbourne, uprooting trees, picking up hay bales and impacting a school before it dissipated.	
Horsham Tornado	7 December 2020	Victoria	1	0	Northern parts of Horsham were impacted by a tornado, damaging 70 houses.	F1
Chester Hill Tornado	20 March 2021	New South Wales	1	0	In Chester Hill, a suburb in western Sydney, a small tornado damaged homes and toppled trees, leaving thousands without electricity.	F1
Bathurst Tornado	30 September 2021	New South Wales	1	3 injured	A tornado formed from a huge front which travelled across Eastern Australia. This tornado formed in Bathurst just after 2:00PM from a dangerous supercell created from the front. The tornado travelled 30 kilometres (19 mi) from Clear Creek to Meadow Flat, and caused 11 homes to be damaged or destroyed.	EF3
Armidale Tornado	14 October 2021	New South Wales	1	unknown	A tornado that formed after a strong supercell crossed over Armidale caused considerable damage to houses, as well as overturned cars and uprooted some trees. This storm has left many without power.	F2
Blue Haven Tornado	7 December 2021	New South Wales	1	unknown	A tornado that crossed Doyalson Link Road, picking up debris along its path.	F1
Bombala Tornado	15 January 2022	New South Wales	1	0 Fatalities	A tornado touched down in the town of Bombala. Roofs and sheds were damaged with scattered debris across the town, witnessed by many locals and filmed by one. The tornado left a trail of destruction through a Pokolbin winery.	F2
Salisbury Tornado	30 May 2022	South Australia	1	0	A weak tornado struck Salisbury and surrounding northern suburbs of Adelaide at around 5am, causing damage to houses and trees.	
Gold Coast Tornado	25 December 2023	Queensland	2	1 Fatality	A tornado passed through the Scenic Rim, parts of the southern Logan Shire and northern Gold Coast. A woman was killed when a tree fell on her car in Helensvale. It reached wind speeds of over 200 km/h (124 mp/h), classifying it as an EF2 tornado. Almost all mature aged trees were uprooted and many houses were destroyed on the Northern Gold Coast. At the Helensvale Caravan park, slight concrete scouring was observed to areas near driveways.	F2
South Bunbury Tornado	10 May 2024	Western Australia	1	2 injured	At around 4:00pm, a tornado formed on the coast of Bunbury near Mindalong Beach and passed through the suburbs of South Bunbury, Withers, and College Grove, with the 60 metre wide tornado reaching wind speeds of over 150 kilometres per hour (93 mph). The tornado lasted 4 minutes and struck places such as the Bunbury PCYC, which partially collapsed, causing an injury, and the Bunbury Regional Prison, which had the roofs of multiple buildings torn off. In total, more than 220 buildings were damaged, with 16 severely damaged and 9 ruled uninhabitable.	EF1
Victorian High Country Tornado	25 August 2024	Victoria	1	0	A tornado formed at around 5:30pm in Howes Creek, and then caused a 25 km long path of destruction, ending past Boorolite. The tornado itself was 100–400 metres wide, and damaged multiple homes.	
Frankland River Tornado	3 June 2025	South Western Australia	1	1 injured	Around noon, a tornado formed near Frankland River, injuring one person after overturning their vehicle. Lasting two minutes, it flattened a six-foot vermin fence, damaged several vehicles, and tore down red gum trees.	
Sofala Tornado	6 July 2025	New South Wales	1	Unknown	A possible weak tornado was spotted near Sofala, NSW on the afternoon of 6 July 2025 as thunderstorms swept across Eastern NSW. While the funnel wasn't fully condensed, clear ground circulation can be seen.	
City Beach waterspout-tornado	23 July 2025	Western Australia	1	0	A waterspout off the coast of the Perth suburb of City Beach became a tornado after making landfall around 5:20 pm, uprooting multiple trees and tearing the roof off a home.	
Adelaide northern suburbs Tornadoes	29 August 2025	South Australia	2	0	Two small, fast-moving tornadoes were likely to have struck Adelaide's northern suburbs, including Para Hills, Elizabeth Park and Mawson Lakes in the early hours of 29 August, damaging fences, trees, and homes.	
High Wycombe Tornado	5 September 2025	Western Australia	1	0	A tornado occurred in the High Wycombe area between 1:15 - 1:30 pm, causing roof and fence damage to homes. Most of the damage was localised to the houses along Emu Court.	
Central West New South Wales tornadoes	10 September 2025	Central West New South Wales	2	0	A tornado occurred at Tubbul at around 3:30pm, while another occurred shortly afterwards in Caragabal, flipping machinery and captured on video stripping trees, as well as destroying sheds and a roof. The Bureau of Meteorology also received unconfirmed reports of a possible third tornado near Cowra around the same time.	
Wyndham tornado	26 October 2025	Victoria	1	0	A small tornado impacted the suburbs of the Wyndham local government area in Melbourne's west as a severe storm band swept through the state. The tornado primarily affected Werribee and Hoppers Crossing, damaging near on 50 houses and downing power lines, ripping trees out of the ground and blowing sheds through the air across both suburbs.	
South East Queensland tornadoes	24 November 2025	Queensland	3	0	An intense supercell moved 1400km from nearby to Lismore in NSW to Mackay in coastal central QLD, dropping hail up to 15cm wide and packing winds officially to 107km/h, although this figure is likely considerably higher, as the storm did not impact any official stations during its peak intensity. As the storm moved over the water near Coolum Beach, it dropped a short lived tornadic waterspout, caught on video by a resident. As the storm approached the village of Teewah Beach, a nudger cell interacted with the mesocyclone of the storm, leading to rapid development of an intense tornado, tracking roughly 20km from east of Teewah Beach to inland Great Sandy National Park. The tornado was filmed from Teewah Beach as it intensified, going from a rope to a stovepipe in a matter of a few seconds. As the tornado made landfall and started doing considerable damage to vegetation, a debris ball was observed on radar. After the tornado, satellite and drone imagery revealed intense to violent damage to trees, including ground scouring and debarking, indicating the tornado was likely of EF3+ strength as it made landfall, although this is the opinion of online weather analysts rather than the BOM, who have refused to acknowledge the existence of this tornado. As the merger cell cut off the tornado's inflow, it began to rapidly weaken and shrink, doing two loops, before dissipating. A further weak tornado was recorded near Wallu associated with the same storm, although decipherable damage here was impossible due to straight line winds unofficially reaching in excess of 150km/h at this location.	Unofficially EF3+
Ulladulla tornado	3 October 2026	New South Wales	1	0	A tornado struck the CBD of Ulladulla at around 1:00pm AEDT as storms moved across the Southern and Central areas of NSW. The tornado tore roofs off homes, significantly damaged properties, and downed trees and power lines. By 5:00pm, nearly 30 of the more than 100 calls to NSW SES for assistance were from Ulladulla.	
Southern Tablelands tornadoes	31 October 2026	New South Wales	2	0	A suspected tornado struck the locality of Good Hope, 12 km southwest of Yass, during the afternoon. The possible tornado tore the roofs off six buildings and damaged another ten, while also displacing a 40-foot shipping container around 300 metres. Numerous trees were also uprooted and snapped, and the roof of a pergola was swept into a power pole, bringing down power lines. Another suspected tornado was spotted by eyewitnesses and recorded on video by a member of the NSW RFS north of Gunning during the afternoon.	

== Climatological statistics ==
The following is a chart showing Australia tornadoes by month or by time period.

Number of recorded tornadoes affecting Australia
Month	Number of storms
January	20
February	23
March	11
April	5
May	11
June	11
July	17
August	12
September	19
October	19
November	36
December	23

Tornadoes affecting Australia by period
Period	Number of storms
1700s	1
1800s	14
1900–49	10
1950s	1
1960s	2
1970s	9
1980s	7
1990s	13
2000s	22
2010s	106
2020s	27

== See also ==
- Tropical cyclones in Australia
- Lists of tornadoes and tornado outbreaks
