= 1992 Bucca tornado =

F4 tornado in Bucca, Queensland

- The tornado at peak intensity near Bucca.

Meteorological history
- Formed: 29 November, 1992, 3:30 p.m. AEST (UTC+10:00)
- Dissipated: 29 November, 1992, 3:45 p.m. AEST (UTC+10:00)
- Duration: 15 minutes

F4 tornado
- on the Fujita scale
- Max width: 100 m (110 yd)
- Path length: 5 km (3.1 mi)
- Highest winds: ≥335 km/h (208 mph)
- Largest hail: 7 cm (2.8 in)

Overall effects
- Fatalities: 0
- Injuries: 0
- Damage: Unknown
- Areas affected: Bucca and surrounding towns and communities
- Part of the 1992 Queensland storms and Tornadoes of 1992

The 1992 Bucca tornado was a short-lived but violent tornado which was one of the most violent tornadoes ever observed in Australia, being the second Australian tornado to be officially rated F4 or stronger on the Fujita scale. It occurred near the township of Bucca (near Bundaberg) in Queensland on 29 November 1992 at around 3:30 p.m. AEST. The tornado was accompanied by cricket-ball sized hail across Bucca and Bullyard regions.

The tornado damaged or destroyed nine houses, some flattened to the ground. Trees were snapped and stones were found embedded into tree trunks. Several tree saplings were speared into the walls of homes. A refrigerator from one home was blown away and never found. A 3-ton truck was also thrown 300 metres (980 ft) and approximately 20 cattle were killed. Jeff Callaghan, a retired senior severe weather forecaster at the Bureau of Meteorology said "the Bucca tornado was rated a F4 or possibly an F5." Although the most violent Australian tornado with an official rating, the tornado did not kill or seriously injure anyone.

The weather system that spawned the Bucca tornado was also responsible for an F3 tornado at Oakhurst.

== See also ==
- 1992 Queensland storms
- 1876 Bowen tornado, the strongest tornado in Australian history
- 1970 Bulahdelah tornado, another strong tornado in New South Wales
- 1973 Brisbane tornado, the costliest Australian tornado
- List of Southern Hemisphere tornadoes and tornado outbreaks
- List of Australian tornadoes
- Tornadoes of 1992
