= 1973 Brisbane tornado =

F3 tornado in Brisbane, Queensland

- Satellite imagery of the synoptic environment a few hours after the tornado

Meteorological history
- Formed: 4 November 1973, 6:10 p.m. AEST (UTC+10:00)
- Dissipated: 4 November 1973, 6:50 p.m. AEST (UTC+10:00)
- Duration: 40 minutes

F3 tornado
- on the Fujita scale
- Max width: 220 m (240 yd)
- Path length: 51 km (32 mi)
- Highest winds: 255 km/h (160 mph)

Overall effects
- Fatalities: None
- Injuries: 20 (Note: This figure is specifically allocated to the reported injuries, of which 12 of the injured victims were hospitalised. The 100 people hit by flying debris is not included here.)
- Damage: >$2 million (1973 AUD) >$21.2 million (2025 AUD) (Note: In 2025 USD: $13.7 million) (Costliest in Australian history)
- Areas affected: Regions in western and southern Brisbane (most notably Yeronga, Taringa, Nathan Heights and Moorooka) (Note: See the full list of suburbs in Tornado summary.)
- Part of the list of Australian tornadoes and Tornadoes of 1973

On the early evening hours of 4 November 1973, a strong, long lived and destructive tornado passed through and destroyed parts of the western and southern suburbs of Brisbane, Queensland. The tornado, commonly referred to as the 1973 Brisbane tornado, is regarded as the costliest and one of the strongest tornadoes in Australian history given the magnitude of its impact on Yeronga, Taringa, Nathan Heights and Moorooka. The tornado was first spotted meandering west of Brookfield, where it erratically weaved its way through numerous suburbs, such as Indooroopilly, Moorooka and Eight Mile Plains. Eventually, the tornado passed Victoria Point into Moreton Bay where it eventually dissipated. According to Australian meteorologist Jeff Callaghan, the storm would be catastrophic in modern times due to urban development in regions across Brisbane.

The tornado, rated F3 on the Fujita scale ultimately carved a 51 km (32 mi) path of destruction through the city, at a peak width of 220 m (240 yd). The total cost of the event was estimated at $2 million (1973 AUD), equivalent to $23.9 million (2026 AUD) when adjusted for inflation. Despite its damage, no one was reported as dead, although 12 people were hospitalised, 20 were injured and 100 were cut by flying debris.

== Meteorological synopsis ==
Surface weather analysis of Australia on 4 November, just three hours before the tornado

On 3 November, the Bureau of Meteorology issued a national weather forecast, stating the conditions in Brisbane were mostly fair and not thought to produce severe weather conditions throughout the weekend. Chances for a tornado to occur were not stated. On 4 November at 3:00 pm, the BoM published a surface weather analysis map of Australia, not detailing a cold front or surface trough situated in and around southeast Queensland.

On 4 November, the environment above Brisbane was supportive for tornadogenesis. There was a slow moving, intensifying surface trough over SE Queensland alongside an approaching cold front from the west. Upon collision of the two air masses, radiosonde observations had shown the lapse rate had increased, indicated by 19.6°C temperatures just above the surface and -12.7°C at a 500 hPa altitude. Additionally, it was also indicated the wind shear had also risen since the collision of the two masses. The combination of said forces further supported the formation of thunderstorms as well as tornadoes. These storms ultimately produced several funnel clouds, but at 6:15 pm local time, the one and only tornado was formed.

== Tornado summary ==
The tornado touched down at 6:10 pm local time west of Brookfield in western Brisbane. The tornado began on an ESE path towards the suburb, dealing very light damage. On its approach to Brookfield, the tornado started to steer towards the NE. Upon arriving at Brookfield and Kenmore Hills, the tornado did its first serious damage, in the form of extensively damaging buildings and trees. Afterwards, the tornado crossed parts of Mount Coot-tha on its NE approach until it dived ESE further into the Brisbane metropolitan area, simultaneously intensifying further. The next suburb to be impacted was Indooroopilly, where damage was mostly related to small residential housing, although damage was still marginal. The adjacent suburb, Taringa, was regarded as a heavily impacted region, as the tornado unroofed numerous houses and uprooted the surrounding trees. Additionally, locals claimed the sky turned green-black during the destruction. It was at this stage that the tornado crossed the Brisbane River.

Continuing on its ESE trajectory, the storm destroyed numerous businesses on Fairfield Road in Yeronga, razing them to the ground. At this stage, the tornado was starting to steer SSE, on approach to Moorooka. It was at this point the tornado had reached its peak intensity, recognised to be F3 on the Fujita scale. In Moorooka, its local Bowls Club took a direct hit from the funnel, resulting in serious roof damage. Although in the adjacent suburb, Yeerongpilly, the damage wasn't as intense, houses suffered significant structural damage, accompanied by smashed windows. After impacting the two suburbs, the funnel abruptly switched direction to the ESE on approach to Salisbury. Similar to Yeerongpilly, the damage in Salisbury was not as intense as Moorooka but was marginal. Right afterwards, the tornado started back on its SSE movement and Nathan Heights was affected severely, where multiple houses were levelled and trees were severely uprooted. In Macgregor, the local high school was regarded as one of the most severely damaged buildings in the entire disaster, as its roof had been torn off, walls damaged and multiple classrooms obliterated. At that stage, the tornado started to gradually steer to the ENE. In the process, the tornado inflicted marginal impact to Eight Mile Plains. It was at this point the storm's path was mostly linear. It inflicted some damage in Capalaba and Victoria Point before it eventually crossed into Moreton Bay at about 6:50 pm, before eventually dissipating.

Ultimately, the tornado had carved a long 51 km (32 mi) into the suburbs of Brisbane, at a changing width between 100 m (110 yd) and 230 m (250 yd). An estimated 500 houses throughout Brisbane had their roofs ripped off, 500 declared structurally unsafe and 1390 labelled as damaged. The tornado managed to rip and tear down hundreds of power poles and miles of power lines, which cut electrical power in the nearby buildings, but the power was expected to be restored the following night. During the event, no person was reported killed, but 12 were hospitalised, 20 injured and 100 cut by flying debris. Overall, the damage inflicted by the tornado was estimated at $2 million (1973 AUD), $23.9 million (2026 AUD) when adjusted for inflation.

The regions of Brisbane that the tornado affected was Brookfield, Kenmore Hills, Mount Coot-tha, Indooroopilly, St Lucia, Yeronga, Moorooka Yeerongpilly, Salisbury, Nathan Heights, Macgregor, Eight Mile Plains, Capalaba and Victoria Point, and the surrounding regions. Among these suburbs, Yeronga, Taringa, Nathan and Moorooka were declared as the most severely damaged regions.

== Aftermath ==
To this day, the tornado is commonly regarded as the costliest tornado in Australian history, as well as one of the strongest. According to Australian meteorologist Jeff Callaghan, the storm would be catastrophic in modern times due to urban development in regions across Brisbane. On 6 November, just two days after the tornado struck Brisbane, a series of unrelated severe thunderstorms structured in a linear form was detected by weather radar at 1:15 pm local time. At 1:40 pm, the Bureau of Meteorology issued a thunderstorm warning for the regions prior to storm impacts. Twenty minutes later, the thunderstorms crossed over Brisbane, ultimately halting recovery efforts from the previous tornado. It was reported that some impacted houses were flooded by the tornado in combination with the storms, blowing off temporary house covers. The existing Queensland Civil Defence Organisation was upgraded and replaced with the Queensland State Emergency Service (SES) in 1975, which was in response to the tornado and the floods caused by Cyclone Wanda two months later to establish a better emergency system.

== See also ==
- List of Australian tornadoes
- Tornadoes of 1973
- History of Brisbane
- Climate of Brisbane
- Cyclone Wanda – Overshadowed the tornado's magnitude
- 1992 Bucca tornado – Strongest in modern Australian history
- Joplin tornado – Costliest tornado on record
- 1973 San Justo tornado
- 1973 Valley Mills tornado
