= Floods in New South Wales =

Natural disasters in Australia

Australian rivers have been subject to devastating floods in New South Wales, recorded since colonisation. Flooding in New South Wales has predominately been caused by excessive flows into rivers located in New South Wales and, to a lesser extent, excessive flows into rivers located in Queensland and Victoria. Floods can devastate local communities and impact the entire local economy.

The principal topographic feature of New South Wales is the series of low highlands and plateaus called the Great Dividing Range, which extend from north to south roughly parallel to the coast of the Coral and Tasman seas of the South Pacific Ocean. Flooding occurs both west and east of the Range, although the prevalence and impact of flooding of rivers that flow easterly towards the coast is more pronounced due to larger flows of water and high population levels. The principal meteorological cause of flooding is the Australian east coast low.

Australia experienced significant flooding disasters in 2010 and 2011 with a series of floods that occurred during March 2010 in Queensland and Victoria; and again in Victoria in September, in Queensland during December 2010 and February 2011, and in Wollongong in March 2011. The Victorian and Queensland floods, although occurring in other states, were deemed to be one of the worst floods Australia and New South Wales had experienced. In 2021, there was a huge flood in NSW and Queensland.

== Major flood events ==
=== Gundagai, 1831, 1844, 1852, 1891, 1925, 1974, 2010 and 2012 ===
Gundagai is a small rural town located on the banks of the Murrumbidgee River in the South West Slopes region. The town was subject to flooding through a series of events during the 19th century. The Murrumbidgee has risen above 7 metres (23 ft) at Gundagai nine times between 1852 and 2010, an average of just under once every eleven years. Since 1925, flooding has been minor with the exception of floods in 1974 and in December 2010, when the river rose to 10.2 metres (33 ft) at Gundagai.

The Gundagai floods of 25 June 1852 were some of the worst to ever hit Australia. By 24 June the township was isolated and incredibly wet, with almost three weeks of heavy rain. It is believed that at least 89 people perished as a result of the flooding of the Murrumbidgee, the most Australia has ever seen from flooding. The number of residents living in Gundagai at that time was estimated to have been 250; accounting for at least 35 per cent of the population to be taken as a result of the floods. Following the 1852 floods, the town was rebuilt on higher ground.

In 1925, four people died and the flooding of the Murrumbidgee at Gundagai lasted for eight days. Major flooding occurred during March 2012 along the Murrumbidgee River including downriver of Gundagai at Wagga Wagga, where the river peaked at 10.56 metres (34.6 ft) on 6 March 2012. This peak was 0.18 metres (0.59 ft) below the 1974 flood level of 10.74 metres (35.2 ft).

=== Hunter Valley, 1955 ===
Heavy rain had fallen over much of eastern Australia from October 1954 when, on 23 February 1955, an intensifying monsoon depression moved south from Queensland. Torrential rain developed, particularly over the area of New South Wales from Warren to Cassilis. Rainfall totals exceeded 250 millimetres (9.8 in) in 24 hours between Nevertire and Dunedoo, a phenomenal amount for this area. Heavy rains then moved east across the Liverpool Range and down the Hunter Valley. With intense rain falling on already saturated ground, the Hunter River, along with several westward-flowing rivers, soon reached unprecedented levels.

The Hunter Valley flood occurred on 23 February and resulted in 24 deaths, predominately in Singleton and Maitland. Five people lost their lives due to electrocution during rescue operations. A total of 7,000 buildings and homes were damaged. The total cost of the flood was approximately A$1.3 billion. The cleanup from the flood took months and as time passed homes were restored and businesses reopened.

=== Murray River, 1956 ===
While there were no deaths, the 1956 flood of the Murray River was significant in its duration, extending over seven months, and its impact on the Far West Region of New South Wales and those parts of Victoria and South Australia west of Wentworth, where the Murray reaches its confluence with the Darling River. The floods led to the construction of the Menindee Lakes as a flood mitigation tool on the Darling.

=== Hawkesbury and Georges River, 1986 ===
On 4 August 1986, an east coast low brought torrential rain to Sydney, with a record 327.6 mm falling within 24 hours and up to 250 mm recorded across the western suburbs. With the rainfall reaching 327.6 millimetres (12.90 in) in 24 hours, this day has been dubbed Sydney's wettest day ever. The resulting floods affected around 10,000 homes, severely disrupted road, bus and ferry transport, caused widespread power outages, and claimed six lives. The flood prompted many motorists to abandon their cars. Bus services were severely disrupted in the city and trains were halted due to flooded tunnels. As the system moved south and west, major flooding also occurred in the Blue Mountains, Georges River and Hawkesbury River catchments, with the Georges River reaching 4.5 m and the Hawkesbury River peaking at 12.8 m at Milperra. Insurance losses were estimated at A$35 million (equivalent to approximately A$215 million in 2011 values).

=== Hunter Valley and Central Coast, 2007 ===
An intense east coast low pressure system developed on 8 June. Over the next 36 hours, the Hunter Valley and Central Coast were battered by the system's strong winds and torrential rain, which caused extensive flooding, damage, loss of life and the grounding of a 225-metre-long (738 ft) bulk carrier. The strongest observed wind gusts were 135 kilometres per hour (84 mph) at Norah Head and 124 kilometres per hour (77 mph) at Newcastle. A family of four and a nephew were killed when a section of road collapsed under their car as they drove along the Pacific Highway at Somersby on the Central Coast. Two people died when their four-wheel drive was swept off a bridge by floodwaters at Clarence Town and a man died near Lambton when he was swept into a storm-water drain. The following day, a man died when a tree fell onto his vehicle at Brunkerville. Another man died during a house fire that, it is believed, was started by a candle being used during the blackouts caused by the storm. The total death toll rose to ten. On 10 June approximately 4,000 residents in the riverside communities of central Maitland, South Maitland and Lorn were evacuated from their homes in anticipation that the Hunter River would breach its levee system. Evacuation centres were set up at East Maitland and Maitland High School. However, by the morning of 11 June the floodwater had peaked without breaking the levee bank.

=== Wollongong, 2011 ===
The March 2011 flood of Wollongong and the Illawarra region were the result of a storm cell covering most of the southern regions of the state and torrential rain in suburban Sydney and nearby regional areas. The Bureau of Meteorology issued flash flood warnings for the South Coast, Riverina, Illawarra, South West Slopes, Snowy Mountains and Southern Tablelands, with heavy rain expected to continue. In the first 48 hours of the flood (20–21′March) 160 millimetres (6.3 in) of rain fell in Wollongong. Robertson in the Southern Highlands recorded the state's highest rainfall on 21 March with 83 millimetres (3.3 in) equalling the March record for 2003. A man was believed to have drowned after his body was found at a stormwater bridge at Warilla.

=== Northern New South Wales, 2012 ===
Heavy rain began falling over Queensland in early 2012 and then moved south resulting in floods in central and western Victoria, NSW and Tasmania. The flooding event of March 2012 saw 75 per cent of New South Wales under flood warnings, forcing evacuations and natural disaster declarations. It was estimated that 16,500 people across New South Wales were isolated. With many parts of the NSW still under water it was impossible to gauge the damage to public and private infrastructure—which could run as high as A$1 billion.

=== Northern New South Wales, 2013 ===
On 17 January Tropical Cyclone Oswald, that had formed in the Gulf of Carpentaria, initiated 11 days of heavy rains off the Queensland coast in the Wide Bay–Burnett area. Major flood warnings were issued for the Bellinger, Kallang, Macleay, Manning, Nambucca, and Tweed Rivers, as well as Camden Haven, the Clarence Valley (including the Orara River), and Hastings. Severe weather warnings were also in place for much of the state, indicating the threat of heavy rains, destructive winds, and dangerous seas.

An estimated 41,000 people were temporarily isolated by flooding in New South Wales. In the Tweed Valley the Tweed River peaked at 3.3 metres (11 ft) on 28 January, the highest level recorded in 30 years. In Grafton the Clarence River peaked a new record height of 8.1 metres (27 ft). Records for the river height in Grafton go back to 1839. The city's levee was credited with preventing more severe flooding. Despite that, around 1,500 people who lived closed to the Clarence River were asked to evacuate on the night of 28 January. Maclean was spared flooding from the Clarence River due to the town's levee. The Clarence Valley was not as fortunate, with many properties cut off and without power. The area was officially declared a disaster zone, as was the Tweed Shire. Minor flooding and road closures were experienced in the Hunter Valley.

=== Northern NSW after Cyclone Debbie, 2017 ===
In the aftermath of Cyclone Debbie in March 2017, Northern NSW was again badly affected by flooding. Lismore was the worst affected with up to 3.5 metres (11 ft) through all CBD businesses. Wilsons River reached 11.6 metres (38 ft) and the levee, finished in 2005, was overtopped.

=== Central West and Riverina, 2016 ===
The Bureau of Meteorology declared 2016 as the third-wettest winter on record. Unseasonal heavy rainfall in most of the state, centred on the catchment area of the upper Lachlan River during autumn and winter 2016, resulted in Wyangala Dam increasing its storage capacity from 38 per cent to 90 per cent. By early August, the Bureau of Meteorology had issued flood warnings for the Orara, Macquarie, Bogan and Lachlan rivers. In late August, Water NSW began releasing up to 10,000 megalitres (350×10^{6} cu ft) per day from Wyangala Dam ahead of expected daily rainfall in the range of 20 to 40 millimetres (0.79 to 1.57 in) in the dam's catchment area. Moderate to major flooding first hit Forbes and Condobolin in early September, and by mid-September predictions were for widespread flooding across most of inland New South Wales. By late September, flooding had peaked in Forbes at 10.67 metres (35.0 ft), with 1,000 people evacuated, as the Newell Highway was cut north and south of Forbes' central business district. Back up support was provided by the State Emergency Service and the Australian Defence Force. As the Lachlan flowed into the Murrumbidgee, major flooding occurred downriver during late October and early November at Hay, Darlington Point, Carrathool and Hillston. The body of a man from Burcher was found, presumably drowned.

=== NSW North Coast Floods, December 2020 – March 2021 ===
In late March 2021, a series of floods affected the east coast of New South Wales from the North Coast to the Sydney metropolitan area in a disaster described by NSW Premier Gladys Berejiklian as a "one-in-100-year event", in addition to being the most significant flood event in 60 years in parts of the state. The Australian government had declared many parts of the east coast a natural disaster zone after the flooding rains which forced thousands to evacuate.

=== Eastern Australia Floods, February 2022 ===
In February 2022, heavy floods occurred in the Wide Bay–Burnett, South East Queensland and the Northern Rivers of New South Wales. The city of Brisbane suffered major flooding, along with the cities of Maryborough, Gympie, the Sunshine Coast, Caboolture, Toowoomba, Ipswich, Logan City, the Gold Coast, Murwillumbah, Grafton and Lismore.

=== New South Wales floods, May 2025 ===
A significant flooding event that impacted the New South Wales coast in May 2025, particularly the Mid North Coast and parts of the Hunter Valley region, including the towns of Taree, Kempsey, Nambucca Heads, Sawtell, Dorrigo, Port Macquarie, and Coffs Harbour. Five people were killed.

The flooding was caused by a slow-moving low pressure system. It is the worst flood disaster in the Mid North Coast region, and access to disaster funding was activated at both state and federal levels. The chief executive of Natural Hazards Research Australia, Andrew Gissing, stated that the flooding was the biggest on record for the region, and a 1-in-500-year event.

== See also ==
- Floods in Australia
- List of disasters in Australia by death toll
