= Bulahdelah tornado =

Intense tornado in Australia

Coordinates: 32°22′59″S 152°11′43″E

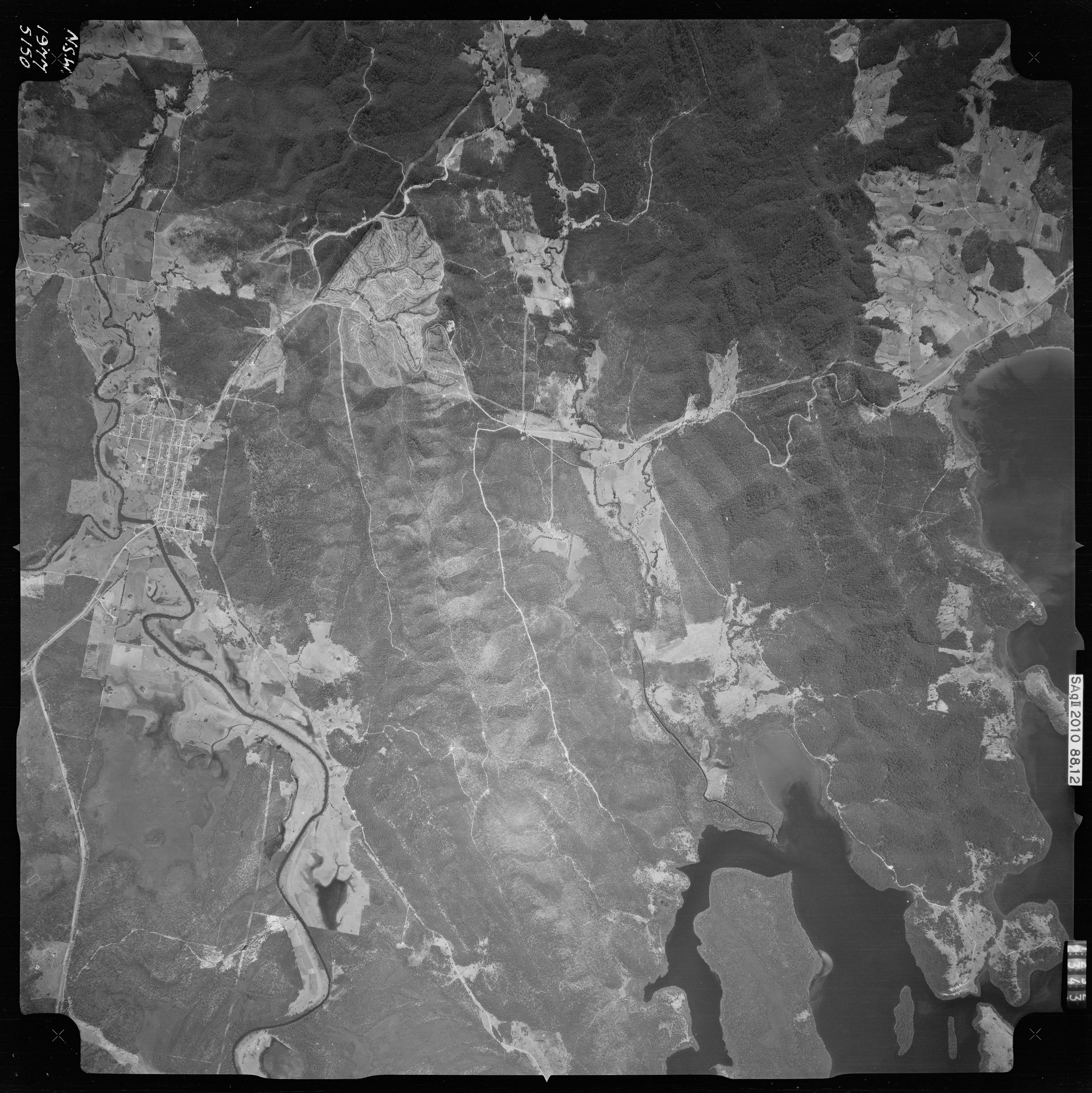
- Aerial photography of Bulahdelah in September 1971, displaying a tornado scar left behind by the tornado

Meteorological history
- Formed: 1 January 1970, 1:45 p.m. AEST (UTC+10:00)
- Dissipated: Unknown
- Duration: Unknown

Unknown-strength tornado
- Highest winds: ≥333 km/h (≥207 mph) (Note: The tornado's accepted wind speed is quite debatable. It is estimated by the locals in Bulahdelah and surrounding areas that the tornado's wind speed was in the F4-F5 range (tornado winds over 333 km/h (207 mph)), but the BoM never did a proper survey on the storm at the time. The highest wind speed that BoM recorded was 63 km/h (39 mph), even below the F0 threshold; a value that lays in the Severe Storms Archive. The tornado's true wind speed remains unknown to this day.)

Overall effects
- Fatalities: 0
- Injuries: 0
- Areas affected: Around Bulahdelah, New South Wales
- Part of the tornado outbreaks of 1970

The 1970 Bulahdelah tornado was a violent tornado which occurred near the town of Bulahdelah 100 kilometres (62.1 mi) north-northeast of Newcastle, New South Wales, Australia on 1 January 1970, and is thought to be the most destructive and powerful tornado ever documented in Australia. On BoM's storm archive, the tornado is given the rating of F0 and contains maximum confirmed winds of 63 km/h (39 mph).

The tornado left a damage path 22 kilometres (14 mi) long and 1.6 km (0.99 mi) wide through the Bulahdelah State Forest. It is estimated that the tornado destroyed over one million trees. Numerous trees were snapped with some being debranched and debarked. A caravan was destroyed and a 2,000 kg (4,400 lb) tractor was lifted into the air, stripped down to its frame and landing upside down. From damage analysis, the storm was stated to have "incredible devastation" and is predicted to have had high end F4-F5 intensity; however, it was never officially rated. The tornado was reported by witnesses as a swirling black cloud surrounded by flying debris, and producing a thunderous roaring sound. The weather system that produced the tornado was a classic set-up for violent tornadoes of the United States.

== See also ==
- Bucca tornado, another violent tornado in Australia in 1992.
- 1876 Bowen tornado, the strongest tornado in Australian history.
- 1973 Brisbane tornado, the costliest Australian tornado
- List of tornadoes and tornado outbreaks
- List of Southern Hemisphere tornadoes and tornado outbreaks
- Australian Tornadoes - Past and Present
