= Sydney to Hobart Yacht Race waterspout =

Disruptive weather event during 2001 yacht race

The south coast tornado was a tornadic waterspout spawned by a supercell thunderstorm off the south coast of New South Wales on 26 December 2001, during the Sydney to Hobart Yacht Race. The tornado passed very close to the yacht Nicorette II, which was severely damaged but able to complete the race with a spare mainsail. Nicorette recorded wind speeds of close to 100 knots (120 mph; 190 km/h; 51 m/s) (making the tornado at least F2 on the Fujita scale) and was struck by hail the size of golf balls. According to the boat's meteorologist, the tornado began with a diameter of around 50 meters (160 feet), but grew in size until it was 500 meters (1,600 feet) across. The waterspout proceeded to strike several other boats with weaker winds. The tornado should not be confused with the severe storm that wrought havoc on the race in 1998.

== See also ==
- List of tornadoes and tornado outbreaks
  - List of Southern Hemisphere tornadoes and tornado outbreaks
