= 1918 Brighton tornado =

1918 tornado family in Melbourne, Australia

Brighton tornado
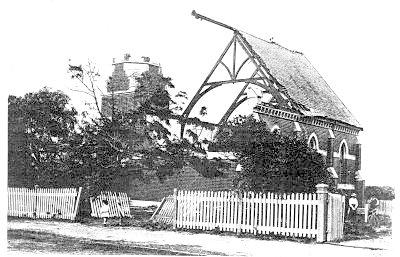
- The Methodist Church, Hawthorn Road, completely destroyed by the tornado

Meteorological history
- Duration: 2 February 1918 5:45 pm-2 February 1918 6:15 pm

Tornado family
- Tornadoes: 3
- Max. rating: F3 tornado
- Duration: 30 minutes
- Highest winds: 198 mph (319 km/h)

Overall effects
- Fatalities: 2
- Damage: A£100,000–150,000
- Areas affected: Brighton, Victoria

On the afternoon of 2 February 1918, with prevailing north-westerly winds and a heat wave (typical conditions for Melbourne thunderstorms). After a severe storm formed and moved off Port Phillip, two tornadoes struck Brighton beach simultaneously at approximately 5:45 pm and proceeded inland, converging near the junction of Halifax and Church Streets. Five minutes later, a third tornado struck. The tornadoes then tracked east over open fields.

Damage retrospectively rated F3 on the Fujita scale was observed in places. Two people were killed, a man and a boy, while the drowning of a woman at St Kilda beach is believed to be related to the same storm cell. Over 6 were injured in the Brighton area.

The tornado completely destroyed the Hawthorn Road Methodist church, which was later rebuilt. Numerous homes were demolished. The tornado badly damaged the Brighton Baths, tore the roof off Royal Terminus Hotel and destroyed the verandah of Grimley's Hotel. Extensive damage was incurred to infrastructure on the Sandringham railway line. Several community and sporting facilities were destroyed including the cricket club grandstand and a bandstand. It also damaged the burial monument of Adam Lindsay Gordon in the Brighton general cemetery.

== See also ==
- Extreme weather events in Melbourne
- List of tornadoes and tornado outbreaks
  - List of Southern Hemisphere tornadoes and tornado outbreaks
