= March 2010 Victoria storms =

Series of storms in Victoria, Australia in 2010

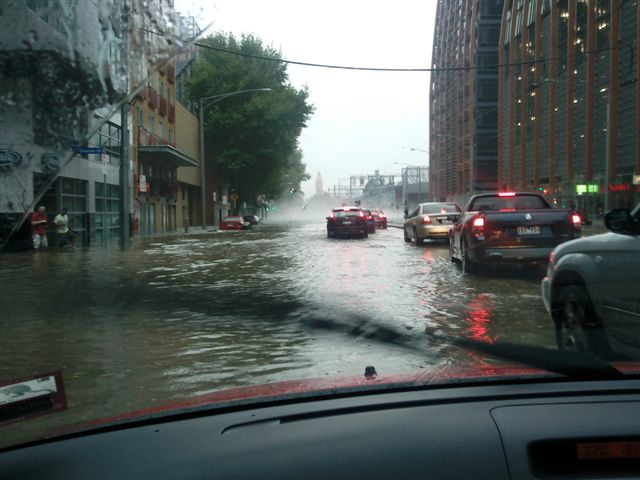
Flash flooding in Flinders Street, Melbourne, 6 March 2010

The 2010 Victorian storms were a series of storms that passed through much of the Australian state of Victoria on 6 and 7 March 2010. One of the most severe storms passed directly over Greater Melbourne, bringing lightning, flash flooding, very large hail and strong winds to the state's capital.

The larger of the storms brought heavy rain and large hail, which led to flash flooding, disrupting transport in central Melbourne and central Victoria throughout the weekend. Many residential buildings were damaged, most due to hail and heavy rain. Some major buildings were evacuated including Flinders Street and Southern Cross stations, several major shopping centres, civic buildings and Docklands Stadium. The storms occurred during the Victorian Labour Day long weekend and affected a number of sporting events and festivals, many of which were postponed or cancelled. On average, hail was between 2 centimetres (0.79 in) and 5 centimetres (2.0 in), while at Ferntree Gully in Melbourne's east, hail of up to 10 centimetres (3.9 in) was reported.

During the weekend of 6 and 7 March, Melbourne experienced 61 millimetres (2.4 in) of rainfall, more than the entire March average of 50 millimetres (2.0 in). Twenty people were treated by paramedics for hail-related injuries at the Moomba Festival, and many more people suffered minor hail-induced injuries of cuts and bruises. At least 50 families, likely many more, were relocated to temporary accommodation. Extensive storms and flash flooding also affected Melbourne only weeks beforehand on 11 February 2010 and on 31 December 2009, while fellow capital city Perth suffered a similar fate on 22 March 2010. As soon as the city recovered, another flash flood affected the Melbourne metropolitan area three weeks later on the morning of 29 March.

== Storm overview ==
In the days before the storm, a large mass of warm, humid, air had passed down from Queensland, where it had caused record flooding in southern Queensland. This warm mass of air clashed with a cold low pressure system coming from the west. The resulting storms involved rotating winds around the low pressure centre, which acted like a "mini-cyclone" according to Bureau of Meteorology forecaster, Scott Williams. These storms swept through Victoria from northwest to southeast from 6 to 7 March. Heavy rain and strong winds continued into 8 March.

=== 6 March ===
The storms developed from a low pressure system to the west of Victoria, generating thunderstorms during the morning of 6 March, which began travelling across the state roughly from northwest to southeast, passing directly through central Melbourne at around 2:40 pm. Multiple storm cells existed, one in Western Victoria and another in Central Victoria and Melbourne, other mostly rain-bearing systems passed through the state throughout the night. At the storm's peak, a 400 kilometres (250 mi) band of rain and hail stretched across the state moving in a southeasterly direction. The storm cells generated thunder, lightning, heavy rain, very large hail and high winds. Nineteen millimetres of rain fell in less than 18 minutes.

=== 7 March ===
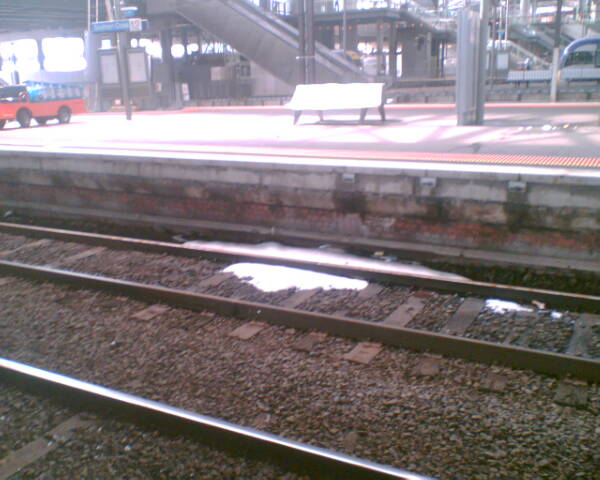
Patches of hail remained at Southern Cross railway station until the afternoon of Sunday 7 March 2010

Moderate to heavy rain continued throughout the evening and into 7 March. Further storms passed through Victoria on 7 March bringing heavy rain to most areas and flash flooding in some areas, though not to the same extent as the 6 March storm. Heavy rain fell throughout the night of 7 March and into 8 March, particularly affecting north central Victoria, where strong wind felled many trees.

== Timeline ==
6 March:

- 8:00 am—Storm forms in north west Victoria
- 12:00 pm—Storm matures just before hitting Bendigo and a severe thunderstorm warning issued for Melbourne.
- 1:30 pm—Storm arrives at Bendigo
- 2.25 pm—Storm arrives at Melton, St Albans, Sunbury and Werribee
- 2:40 pm—Storm arrives at central Melbourne
- 3:00 pm—Storm arrives at Caulfield, Craigieburn, Footscray, Glen Waverley, Greensborough and Preston.
- 3:10 pm—Storm arrives at Scoresby with hail the "size of cricket balls"

Archived BOM rain radar images may be viewed at this external link.

== Affected areas ==
The storms affected much of the state, mostly western and central Victoria but also extending into western and southern New South Wales.

- Bendigo—On 6 March, 50 millimetres (2.0 in) of rain fell causing flash flooding. By 1:30 pm, the Victorian State Emergency Service had responded to 140 calls for help. A house was evacuated in Bendigo as it became inundated.
- Shepparton—On the night of 7 March, heavy rain, strong winds and tornadoes caused flash flooding, widespread damage to buildings and felled many trees.
- Central Darling Shire—estimated that 150 km of road was damaged by the resulting floods.
- Junee Shire—Main southern railway line was damaged at Harefield cutting rain services between Junee and Melbourne and Cootamundra and Melbourne.
- City of Wagga Wagga—Parts of the Local Government Area (LGA) experienced flash flooding after 110.4 millimetres (4.35 in) of rain fell at the airport, which was the wettest day ever recorded in the city. Twenty people from Ladysmith were evacuated after Kyeamba Creek bursts its banks after 200 millimetres (7.9 in) of rain fell. An estimated 100 tonnes (98 long tons; 110 short tons) of grain and 200 kilometres (120 mi) of fencing washed away by the floods in the City of Wagga Wagga LGA.

=== Greater Melbourne ===
Although Greater Melbourne was affected by storms through 6 and 7 March, the most damaging storm cell passed over Melbourne between 2 and 5 pm on 6 March, affecting all areas to varying degrees, bringing heavy rain and flash flooding, high winds and large hail. The storm affected transportation, sporting events and festivals. Several buildings were damaged and evacuated. Many people received minor injuries from hail.

The storm cell arrived in central Melbourne at around 2:40 pm, where the city experienced 19 millimetres (0.75 in) of rain in less than 18 minutes, 26 millimetres (1.0 in) of rain within 60 minutes and 33 millimetres (1.3 in) in 90 minutes. Wind speeds of over 100 km/h (62 mph) were recorded at Melbourne Airport, and 40 millimetres (1.6 in) of rain was recorded at Rockbank, west of Melbourne. 44 millimetres (1.7 in) of rain fell at Monbulk in Melbourne's east and 62 millimetres (2.4 in) fell at Maribyrnong in the city's west.

Hail in the city and western suburbs was "the size of golf balls", whilst hail in the inner east was said to be "marble sized". The area around Ferntree Gully to Lysterfield in Melbourne's outer east experience hail to the size of cricket balls, with an aggregate hail stone measuring 11 cm in diameter recorded in Ferntree Gully by an employee of the Australian Bureau of Meteorology. This is the largest hail stone recorded in the state of Victoria.

In many areas, piles of hail caused disruptions to traffic and sporting events, amongst other things. Hail also affected the many deciduous trees in Melbourne, shredding leaves off the trees which were then taken away by flood waters.

Ambient light in Melbourne decreased significantly throughout the storm, cloud colour was described as "very dark grey to black".

During the storms of 6 and 7 March, Melbourne alone experienced 61 millimetres (2.4 in) of rainfall, more than the entire March average of 50 millimetres (2.0 in).

== Effects ==
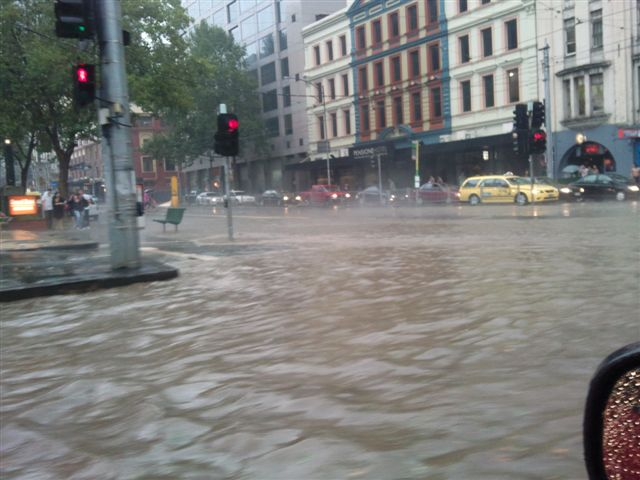
Flash flooding in the intersection of Flinders and Spencer Streets, Melbourne, 6 March 2010

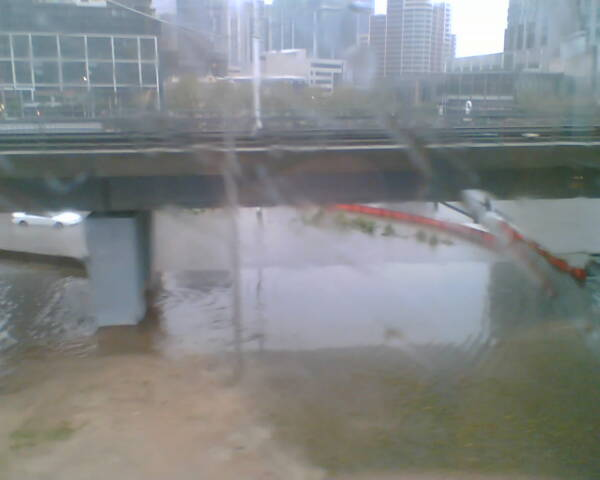
Flooding of the Yarra River, 6 March 2010. A partially submerged car can be seen upper left.

By 1:30 pm, the State Emergency Service had responded to 140 calls for help, this increased to 200 calls by 3:45 pm. By the late afternoon, over 1,000 calls for help had been received, with just over 800 originating from the Melbourne metro area. By 7:00 pm, around 2,500 calls had been received, mostly from residents whose roofs had collapsed and houses that had flooded. Throughout the entire weekend of 6 and 7 March, over 3,500 calls for help were received.

On 8 and 9 March, a further 1,200 calls were received as residents arrived back from long weekend holidays to damaged property. At least 80 Emergency Service personnel from New South Wales and South Australia were enacted to help the Victorian SES cope with the unprecedented demand. The SES anticipated finishing the storm cleanup a full week after the storms.

=== Injuries ===
Many people suffered injuries from hail stones. Although the exact numbers are unknown, most received cuts and bruises. Two people were admitted to intensive care with serious injuries. Paramedics treated around 20 people attending the Moomba Festival on the banks of the Yarra River for hail stone-related injuries. There were reports of parents shielding children with their own bodies, bin lids and other items.

Some competing horses at Flemington Racecourse were also injured. The Lort Smith Animal Hospital treated a number of injured animals and the number of lost dogs tripled, with the Lost Dogs' Home at North Melbourne and RSPCA at Burwood experiencing their busiest periods since New Year's Eve.

Further injuries were incurred following the storms as people attempted to repair storm damaged homes, including falls from ladders and roofs.

=== Building and property damage ===
Many residential dwellings were damaged, some estimates suggest around 2,000, primarily due to overloaded guttering causing roofing leaks and collapses; others were damaged due to flooding, water damage, hail window damage and wind damage. The Insurance Council of Australia declared the storm damage a "catastrophe". By 17 March 2010 more than 40,000 insurance claims had been lodged, worth at least $500 million.

Several major buildings in the city were damaged and evacuated, including Southern Cross station, evacuated primarily due to a roofing collapse; and Flinders Street station, evacuated primarily due to flooding. The Highpoint Shopping Centre, Chadstone Shopping Centre and The Jam Factory were also evacuated. Docklands Stadium was evacuated when roofing at Gate 3 collapsed. Media House and the ABC Headquarters in Southbank were also damaged with roofing collapses. The Melbourne Theatre Company's new building was inundated with water, resulting in the cancellation of several performances for the days following. Neighbouring Melbourne Recital Centre also suffered damage with flooding of internal spaces and hail damage to windows and signage. The roof of The Arts Centre was badly hit, with Premier John Brumby stating that to repair "The damage bill will clearly run to the hundreds of thousands if not millions of dollars". Crown Casino was severely affected with its Village Cinema being closed as a result of flooding as well as banks of gaming tables and machines being cordoned off due to leaks.

Fifty families were relocated by Government authorities to temporary accommodation. Knox City Council set up a disaster relief centre to provide assistance and accommodation for residents with damaged homes.

=== Transportation ===
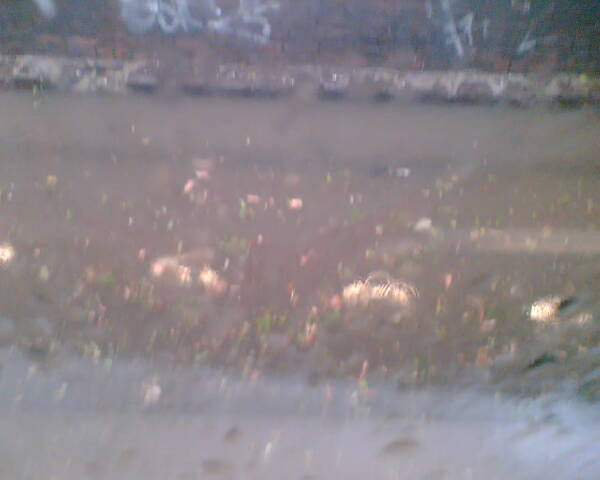
Train tracks under water at South Yarra railway station, 6 March 2010

Transport in central Melbourne was severely affected by the storms, specifically due to flash flooding and piles of hail, causing disruptions to traffic, the cancellation of tram and train services and the evacuation of Southern Cross Station, one of the largest passenger rail stations in Victoria.

Elizabeth Street in the city, situated on a natural watercourse, was completely flooded as water travelled southwards down the hill towards the Yarra River. The Elizabeth Street floodwaters inundated vehicles and several trams. Streets were flooded throughout Melbourne, Southbank, Docklands, South Melbourne and other areas. Roads remained closed in the city centre into the evening. Both the Domain and Burnley tunnels were closed due to flooding, causing traffic on the West Gate Freeway to stop.

Trains initially stopped running between and to Flinders Street and Southern Cross Stations. The entire Hurstbridge line was suspended due to storm damage. There were cancellations on the Belgrave, Epping, Frankston, Sandringham, and Werribee lines and the Upfield line also experienced delays due to storm damage.

Several trams ceased services in the city for the afternoon due to flooding, slowly reopening into the early evening.

One plane was forced to circle for nearly an hour when the storm struck, and three more were diverted to other airports.

At the height of the storm 100 traffic lights were disabled.

=== Utilities ===
100,000 houses were without power in Melbourne and 20,000 across the state during the height of the storm.

=== Event cancellations ===
Two NAB pre-season cup AFL matches were affected by the storms. A match between St. Kilda and Fremantle was initially cancelled but later revised to a later start time due to damage to Docklands Stadium. Another match between Brisbane Lions and Geelong Cats at Visy Park, Carlton was cancelled due to lightning and heavy rain.

Piles of hail and flooding affected racing at Flemington Racecourse, the Australian Guineas and the Australian Cup were both postponed until the following weekend after the track was declared unsafe for racing. Jockey Damien Oliver said that "there was 25mm of ice on the track and another 50mm of water".

The Moomba Festival celebrations, musical events and fireworks were cancelled after hail injured participants, paramedics treated 20 people in attendance.

== Effect on businesses ==
=== Insurance industry ===
A week after the storm IAG lowered their earnings forecast as payouts related to the storm rose, increasing its budget for natural disaster costs by approximately $105 million. At that stage the price tag for the storm was at $256 million and IAG and other insurers, including Suncorp were likely to reach their maximum event retention level in relation to the storm. International insurer Platinum Underwriters Holdings Ltd expected an $85 million loss from catastrophes including the Chile earthquake, winter storms in Europe and the United States, and the Melbourne hail storm.

=== Car dealerships ===
As a result of the storm, hundreds of cars damaged by hail were expected to be sold for large savings at showrooms and auction houses around Melbourne. One dealer stated that his cars would have to be sold for 20% off their list price due to hail damage on boots, bonnets and roofs. Another said that such a sell-off had "never occurred before in [his] 35 years in the industry".

=== Arts ===
The Australian Ballet experienced unprecedented leaks, with 48 years of costumes being damaged and most productions being affected in some way.

The Melbourne Theatre Company had to refund $100,000 in ticket sales due to six lost productions, the Malthouse Theatre also lost productions. Melbourne University's School of Art in St Kilda Road was forced to remain closed all week due to flood damage.

== See also ==
- Floods in Australia
- Severe storms in Australia
- Extreme Weather Events in Melbourne
- Similar events:
- 2010 Western Australian storms
- 2003 Melbourne thunderstorm
- 2005 Melbourne thunderstorm
