= 2009 Australian dust storm =

Meteorological phenomenon in Australia

Coordinates: 35.307°S 149.124°E

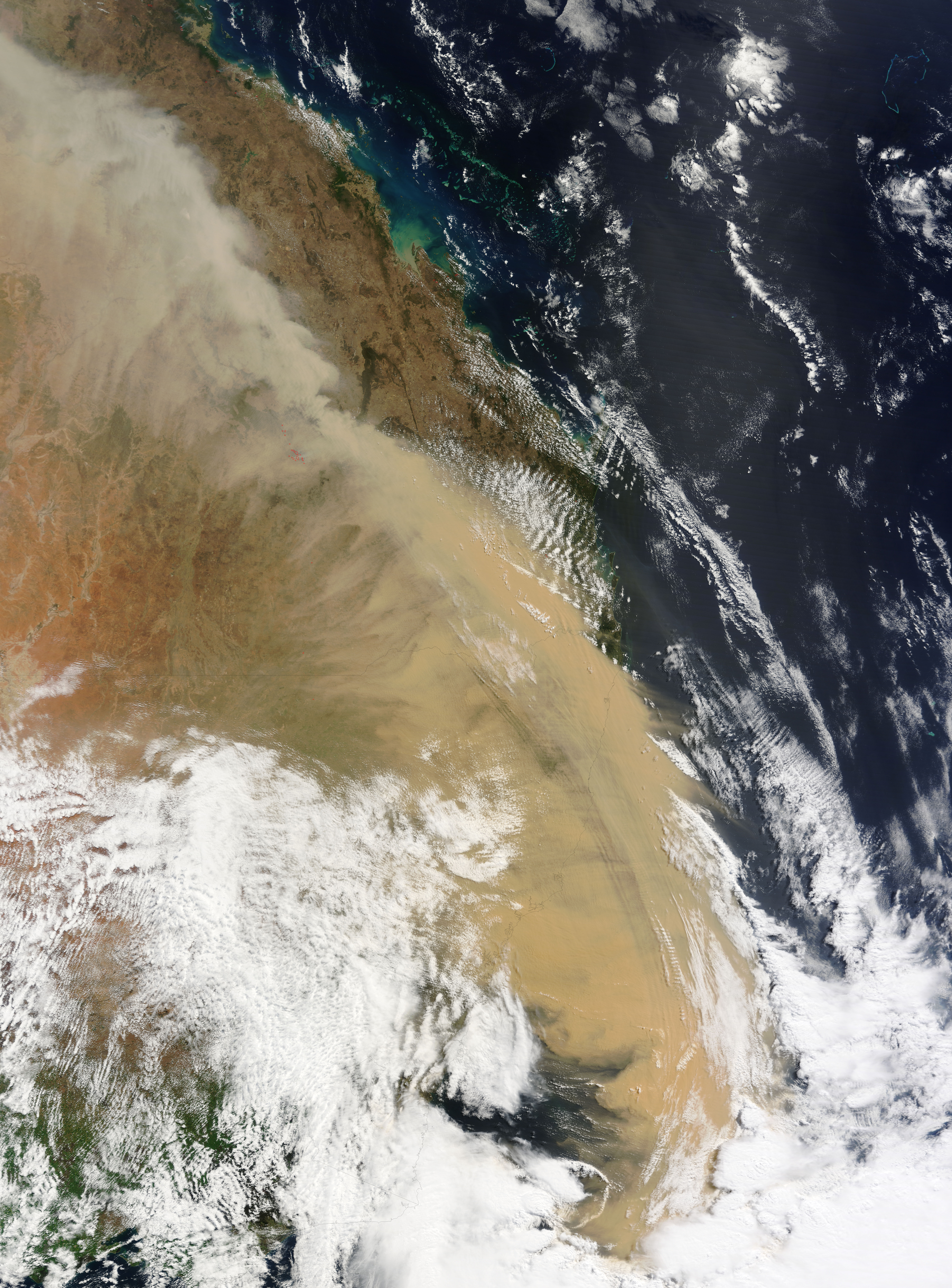
- MODIS Terra satellite image of the dust storm over eastern Australia taken on 23 September 2009

Meteorological history
- Formed: 22 September 2009

Overall effects
- Areas affected: Australia; New Caledonia; New Zealand

The 2009 Australian dust storm, also known as the Eastern Australian dust storm, and often called Red Dawn, was a dust storm that swept across the Australian states of New South Wales and Queensland from 22 to 24 September 2009. The capital, Canberra, experienced the dust storm on 22 September, and on 23 September the storm reached Sydney and Brisbane. Some of the thousands of tons of dirt and soil lifted in the dust storm were dumped in Sydney Harbour and the Tasman Sea.

On 23 September, the dust plume measured more than 500 kilometres (310 mi) in width and 1,000 kilometres (620 mi) in length and covered dozens of towns and cities in two states. By 24 September, analysis using MODIS at NASA measured the distance from the northern edge at Cape York to the southern edge of the plume to be 3,450 km. While the cloud was visible from space, on the ground the intense red-orange colour and drop in temperature drew comparisons with nuclear winter, Armageddon, and the planet Mars.

The dust storm was described by the Bureau of Meteorology as a "pretty incredible event" that was the worst in the state of New South Wales in nearly 70 years. The phenomenon was reported around the world. The Weather Channel's Richard Whitaker said: "This is unprecedented. We are seeing earth, wind and fire together". It was later referred to as "The mother of all dust storms."

== Meteorological situation ==
=== First storm ===
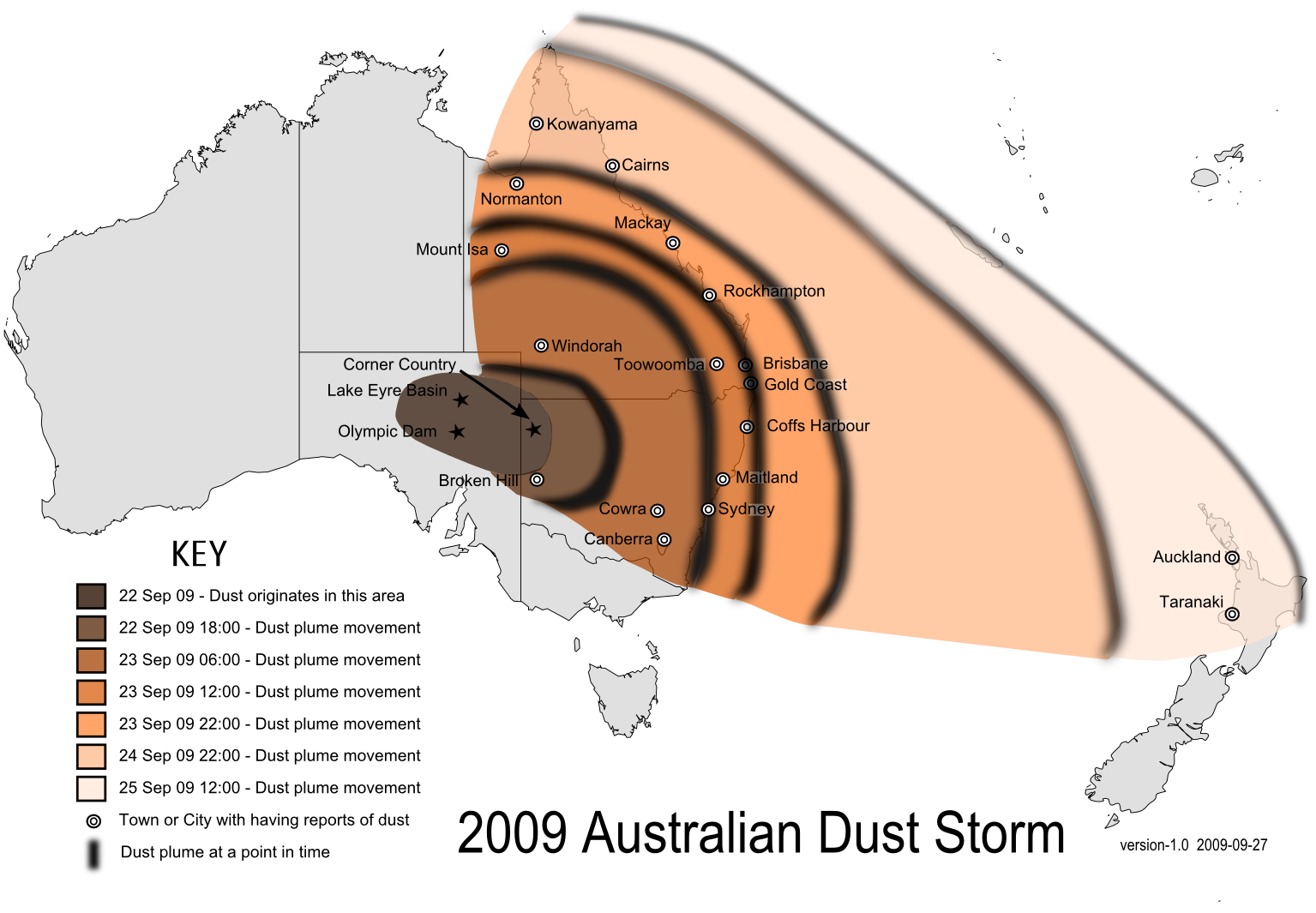
Map of Australia and New Zealand showing the progress of the dust affected area and dust plume at various intervals

According to the New South Wales regional director of the Bureau of Meteorology, Barry Hanstrum, the cause was an "intense north low-pressure area" which "picked up a lot of dust from the very dry interior of the continent". Senior forecaster Ewan Mitchel said winds from a cold front picked up dust from north-east South Australia on 22 September. That night the winds strengthened to 100 km per hour and collected more dust from areas in New South Wales that were drought affected.

Air particle concentration levels reached 15,400 micrograms per cubic metre of air. Normal days register up to 20 micrograms and bushfires generate 500 micrograms. This concentration of dust broke records in many towns and cities. The CSIRO estimated that the storm carried some 16 million tonnes of dust from the deserts of Central Australia, and during the peak of the storm, the Australian continent was estimated to be losing 75,000 tonnes of dust per hour off the NSW coast north of Sydney. The dust storm coincided with other extreme weather conditions which affected the cities of Adelaide and Melbourne.

The dust is believed to have originated from far-western New South Wales and north-east South Australia. This includes an area known as the 'Corner Country', a dry, remote area of far-western New South Wales. In South Australia the dust may also have come from Lake Eyre Basin or the Woomera area, the latter raising concerns that it was radioactive and dangerous since the area contains the Olympic Dam uranium mine.

=== Second dust storm ===
A second dust storm, originating in the same area but believed to be smaller, reached Broken Hill and Cobar by 10 pm on 25 September 2009. This storm arrived in Sydney between 4 and 5 am on 26 September 2009, it pushed the EPA air quality index into the 'Poor to Hazardous' range. However this was not as intense and had cleared by mid morning. The storm reached Brisbane on the evening of 26 September 2009, with the haze expected to clear by 28 September 2009. On 29 November 2009, another minor dust storm occurred, which decreased visibility to 5 km over Sydney.

== Impacts ==
=== New South Wales and the Australian Capital Territory ===
The first city to be affected was Broken Hill, which was 'blacked out' at about 3:30 pm on 22 September 2009. At least one mine was shut down. It was also witnessed in Cowra. The storm blew across Canberra and the surrounding region by midday on 23 September 2009, before being washed away by overnight rain, the heaviest rainfall over Canberra in months.

It was reported that the dust set off smoke alarms across the state and prompted increased demand for emergency services. Asthma sufferers were hospitalised. Rain was also reported to have resulted, with cricket ball-sized hailstones falling.

The dust storm also reached the north coast of NSW on the morning of 23 September 2009. Coffs Harbour was affected by 7 am. At Coffs Harbour Airport visibility was down to 500 metres by 9 am and the airport remained closed until 10:30 am. Grafton and the Clarence Valley were affected by 8:30 am. It caused flight delays at Ballina airport and flight cancellations for most of the day at Lismore airport with visibility at 700 metres. A local school rugby union carnival was also called off.

==== Sydney ====
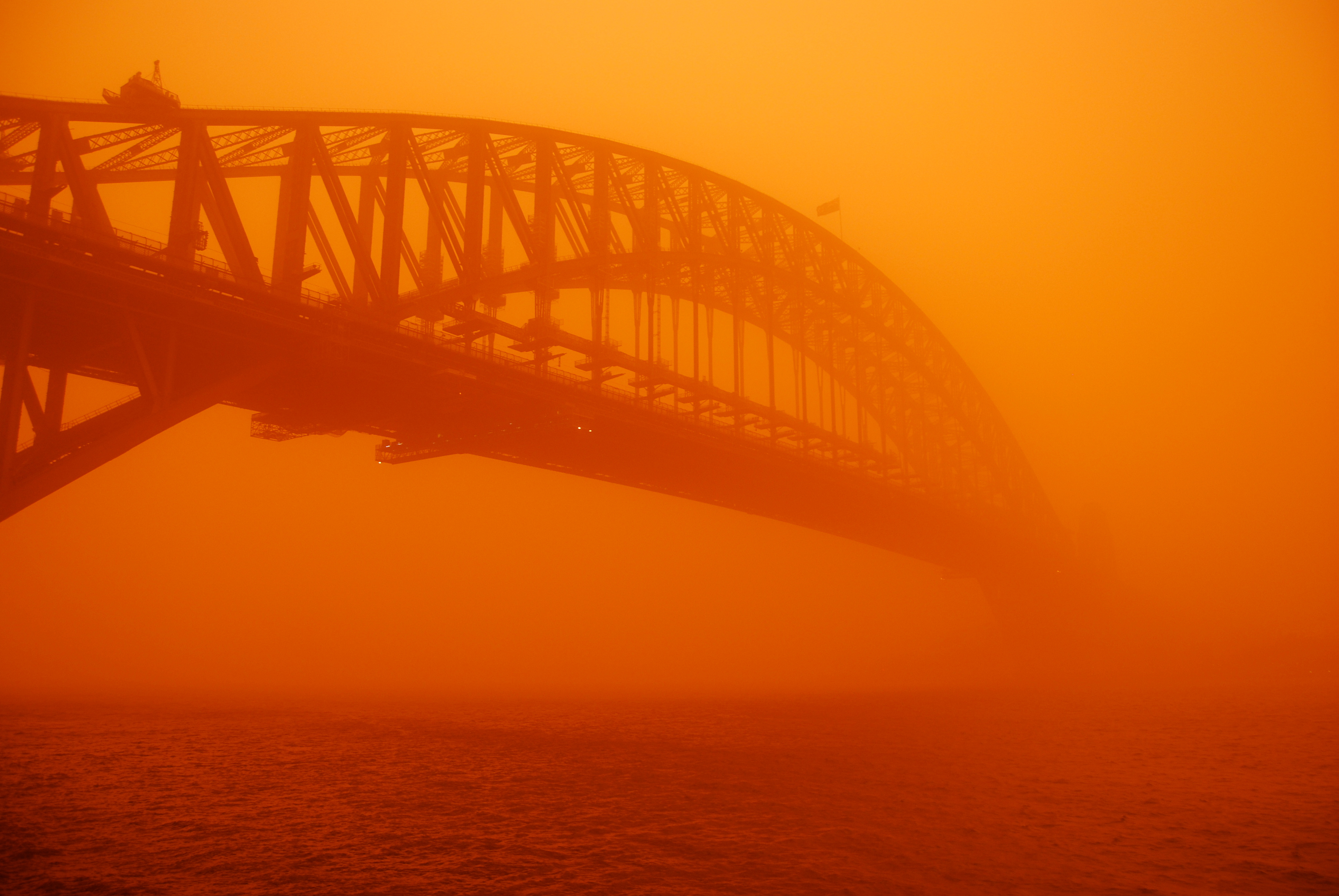
View of Sydney Harbour Bridge covered in dust.

The storm caused severe disruption to international flights—several early morning Air New Zealand flights from Auckland, Christchurch and Wellington had to return to New Zealand after finding themselves unable to land at Sydney Airport. These flights were listed as cancelled and many others were rescheduled to a later time. 18 international flights were diverted to Melbourne Airport or Brisbane Airport, while six others were cancelled altogether. There were delays of six hours reported for overseas flights, whilst domestic flights experienced disruption of as much as three hours.

Roads were disrupted, including the main tunnel of the M5 East Motorway which was shut down. Building sites were closed. Ferry services were cancelled. Canterbury Park Racecourse's scheduled day of horse racing was abandoned.

Schools were disrupted as those children who attended were distracted by the dust storm, while many parents kept their children home. School trips and sports activities were cancelled for the day, and children were directed to stay inside during breaks in some schools. Face masks experienced surging sales in Sydney as concerned residents rushed to protect themselves against the dust, with at least one retailer indicating she had sold more than during the swine flu pandemic.

=== Queensland ===
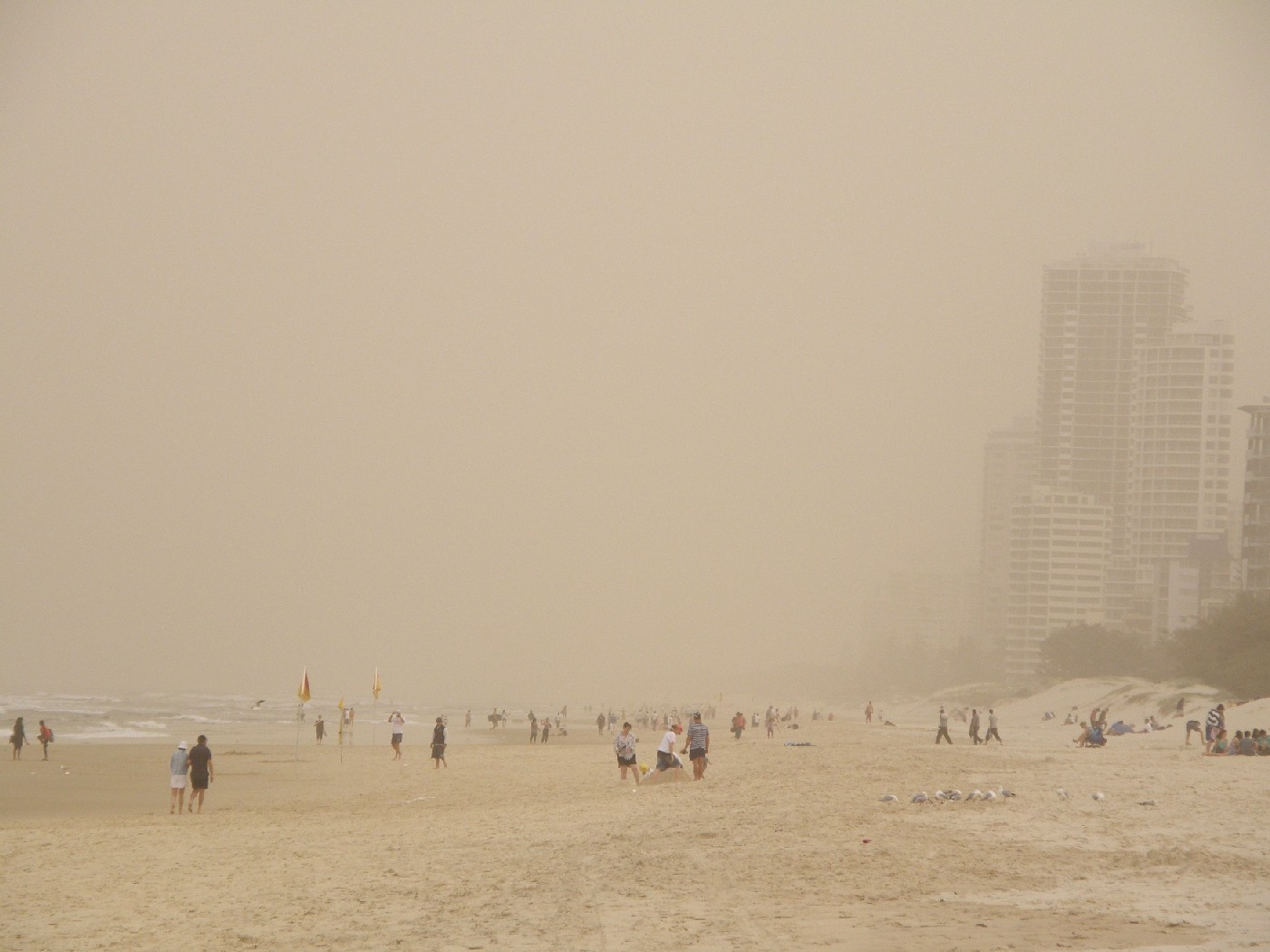
Dust storm at Surfers Paradise beach (looking south)

Residents of Windorah in South West Queensland reported low visibility on the morning of 22 September. By 23 September visibility in Toowoomba and Ipswich in South East Queensland was reduced to 100 metres (330 ft).

Brisbane was affected by the dust storm, although low visibility was less of a problem at Brisbane Airport than it was at Sydney.

The Gold Coast was also severely affected by the dust storm by 11.30 am, reducing visibility to 500 metres (1,600 ft). Work stopped at construction sites due to health concerns, powerlines were down in some areas, the Q-deck was closed and traffic was slow with motorists using headlights. False fire alarms resulted in the evacuation of the Southport Magistrates Court. Flights were able to depart but incoming flights were diverted. The beaches remained open with added 'no swimming' flags in unpatrolled areas. Two fishermen off the coast of South Stradbroke Island were lost and a helicopter was required to locate them.

The dust storm reached Central and North Queensland by the evening of 23 September 2009. However the effect was less serious, with visibility between 50 and 7,000 metres. Commercial flights were not disrupted. Affected areas include Townsville, Blackwater, Rockhampton, Mackay, Cairns and the Gulf of Carpentaria (Normanton and Kowanyama).

=== New Zealand ===
Red dust from the storm reached New Zealand on the morning of 25 September 2009, behind a weather front that brought cold temperatures to the North Island. It was observed by satellite, atmospheric monitoring equipment (a beta attenuation monitor) at Auckland International Airport and by dust settling on the ground. Dust settled across Auckland as well as in the Northland, Waikato, Bay of Plenty and Taranaki districts of the North Island and it also reached the South Island's West Coast.

== In popular culture ==
Roger Deakins, cinematographer of the film Blade Runner 2049, has stated that images of the dust storm in Sydney directly inspired the film's Las Vegas scenes.

With Las Vegas, Denis [Villeneuve] wanted it to have the red dust. We discussed it at length and we came up with these images of Sydney during the dust storm that they had a few years ago. There are these wonderful photos of the Sydney Opera House and it’s covered with red dust. That formed the basis for Las Vegas.

== Gallery ==
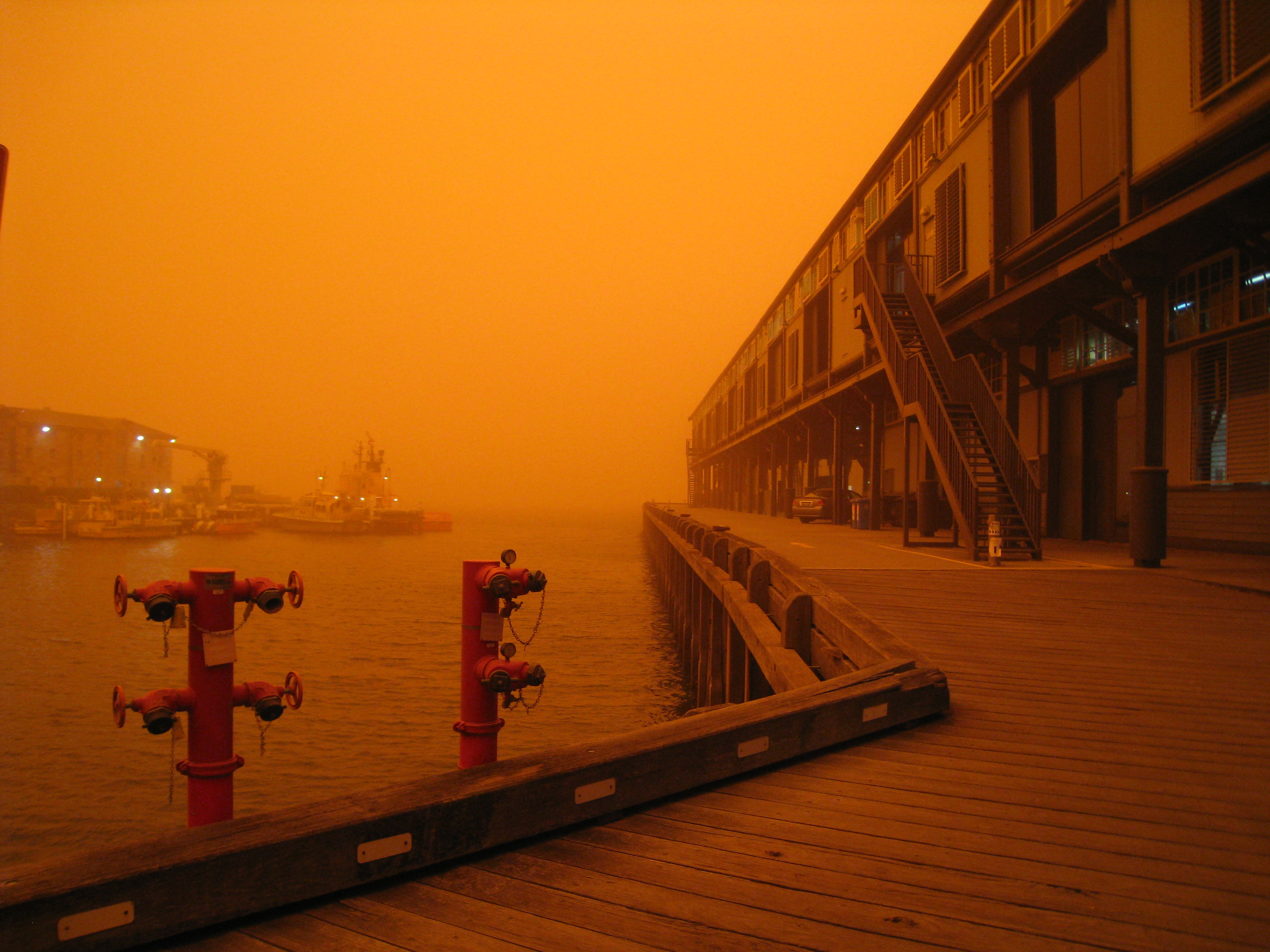
Sydney, NSW

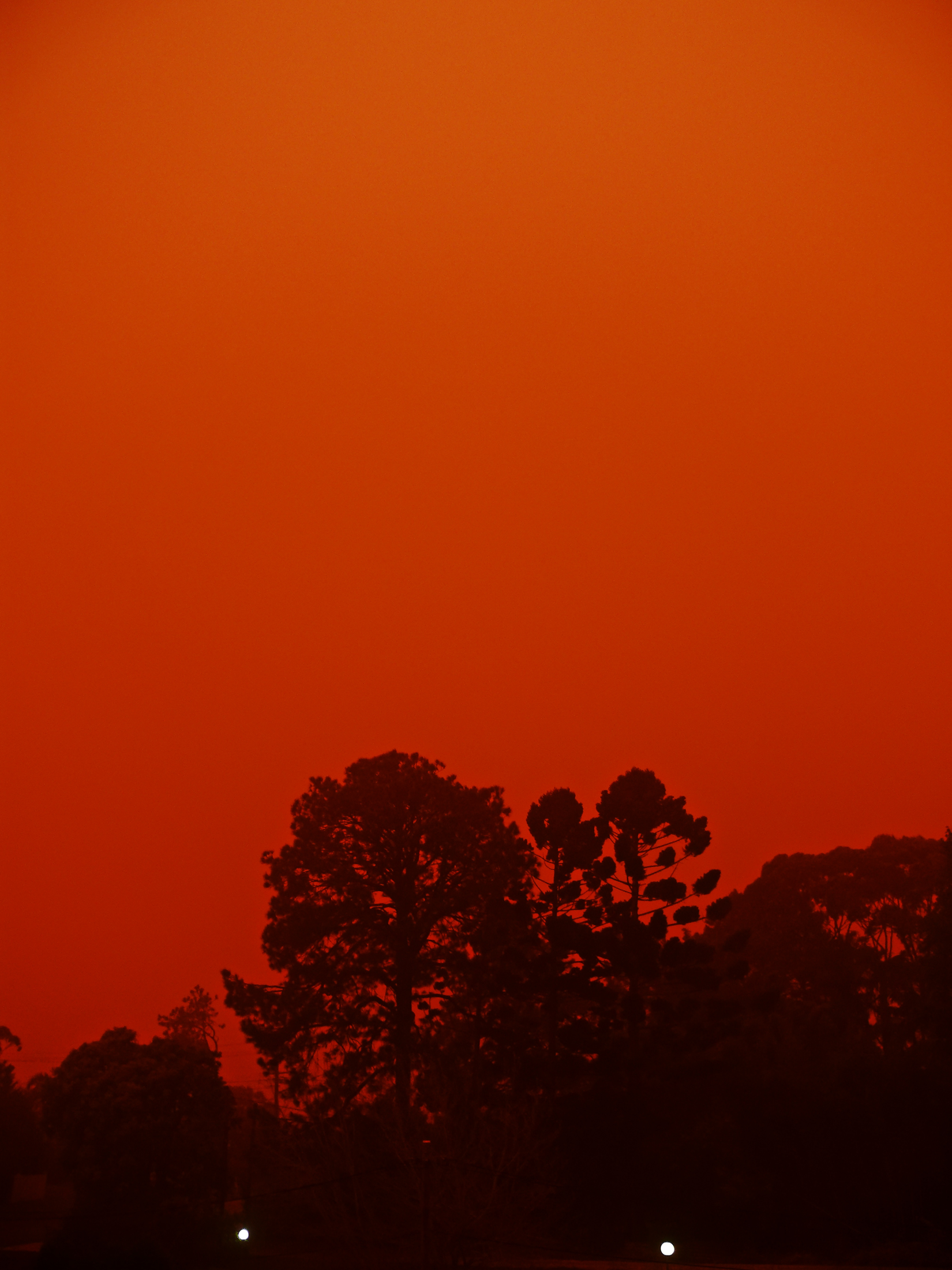
Sydney, NSW

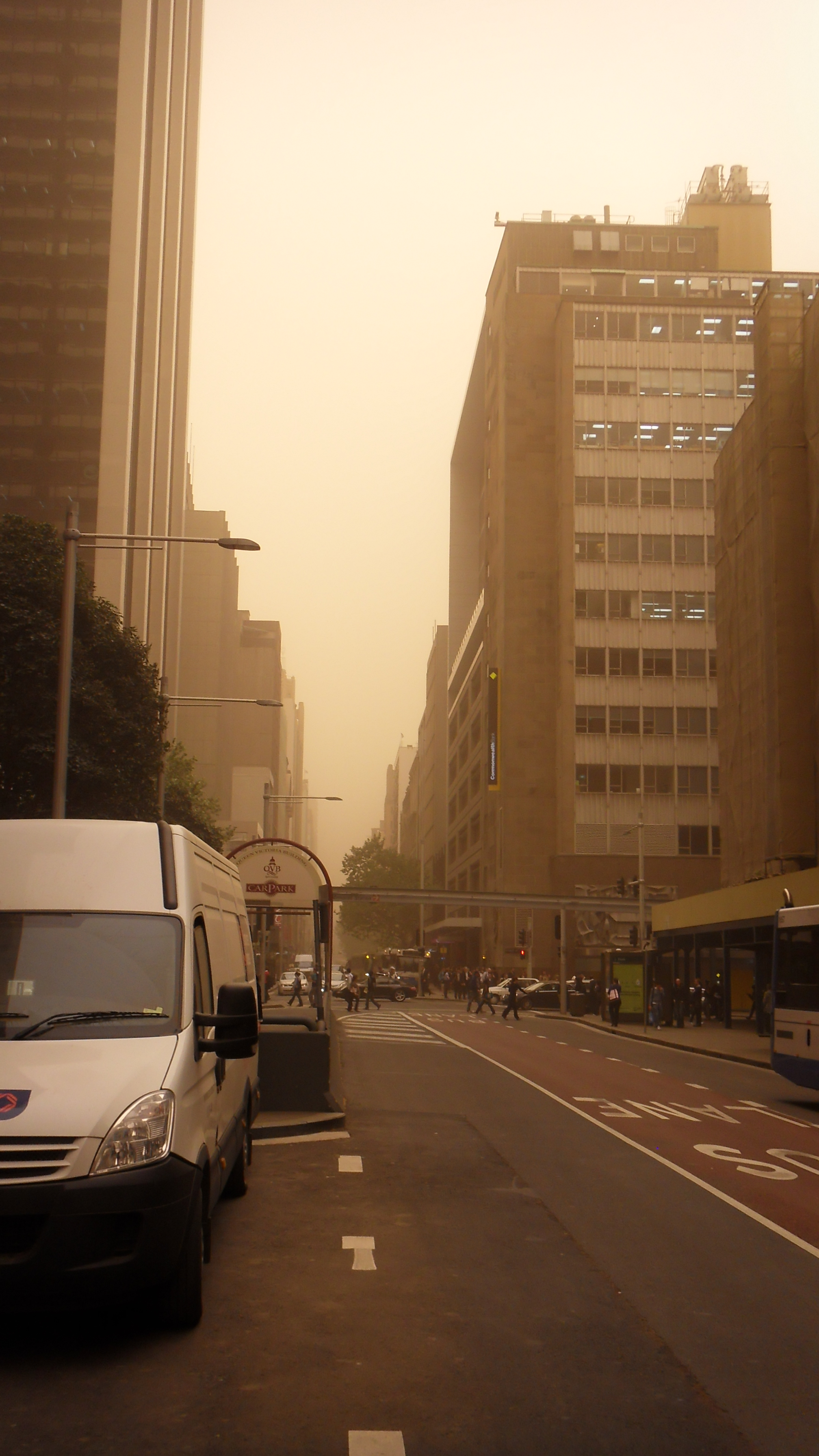
Sydney CBD

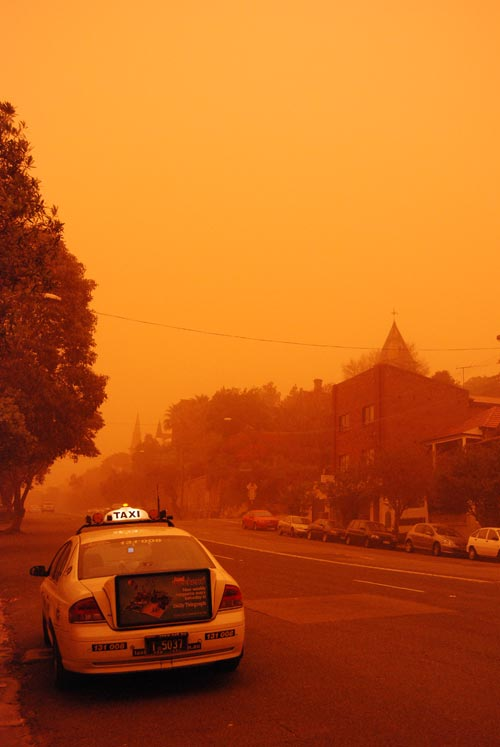
Sydney, NSW

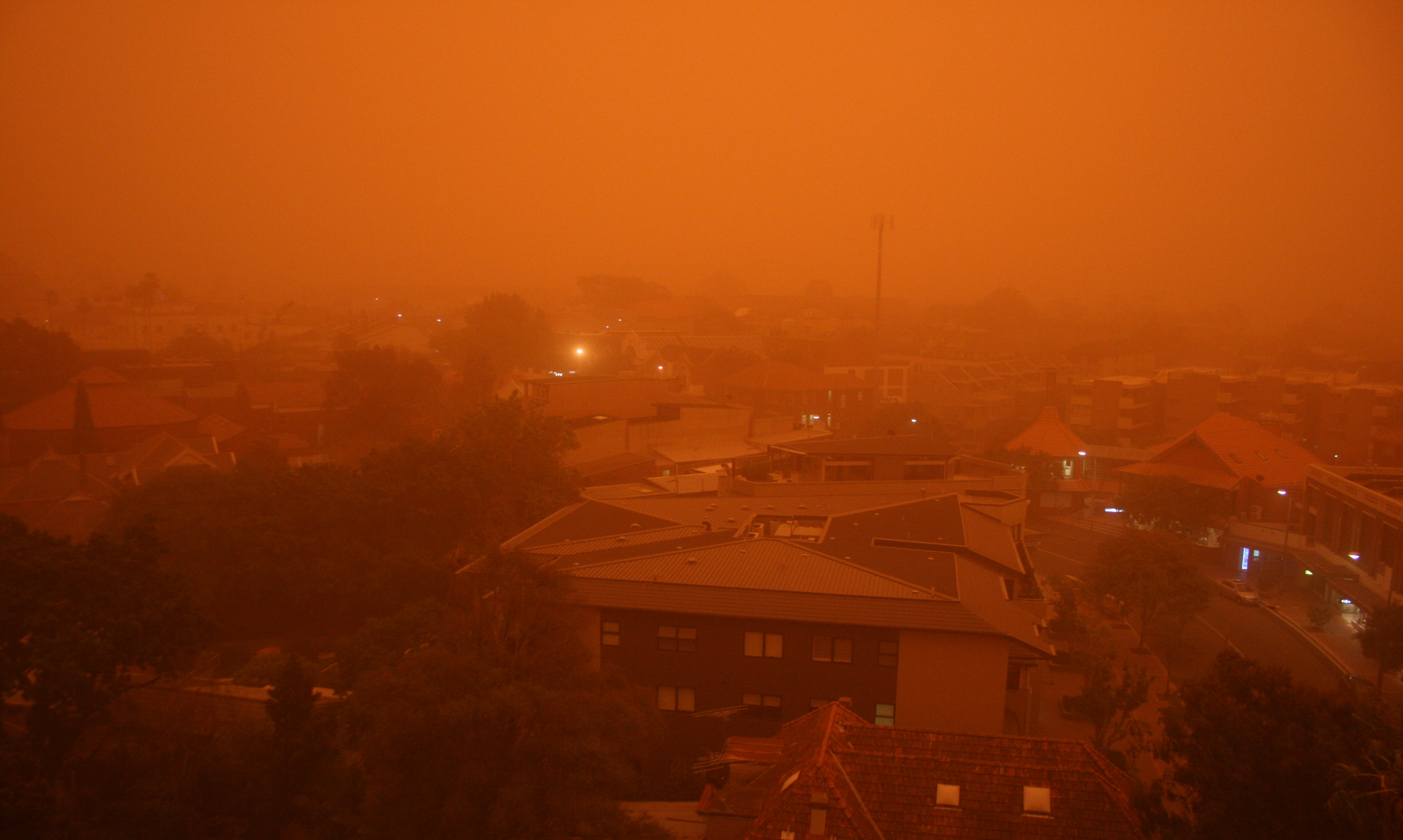
Suburban Sydney at dawn

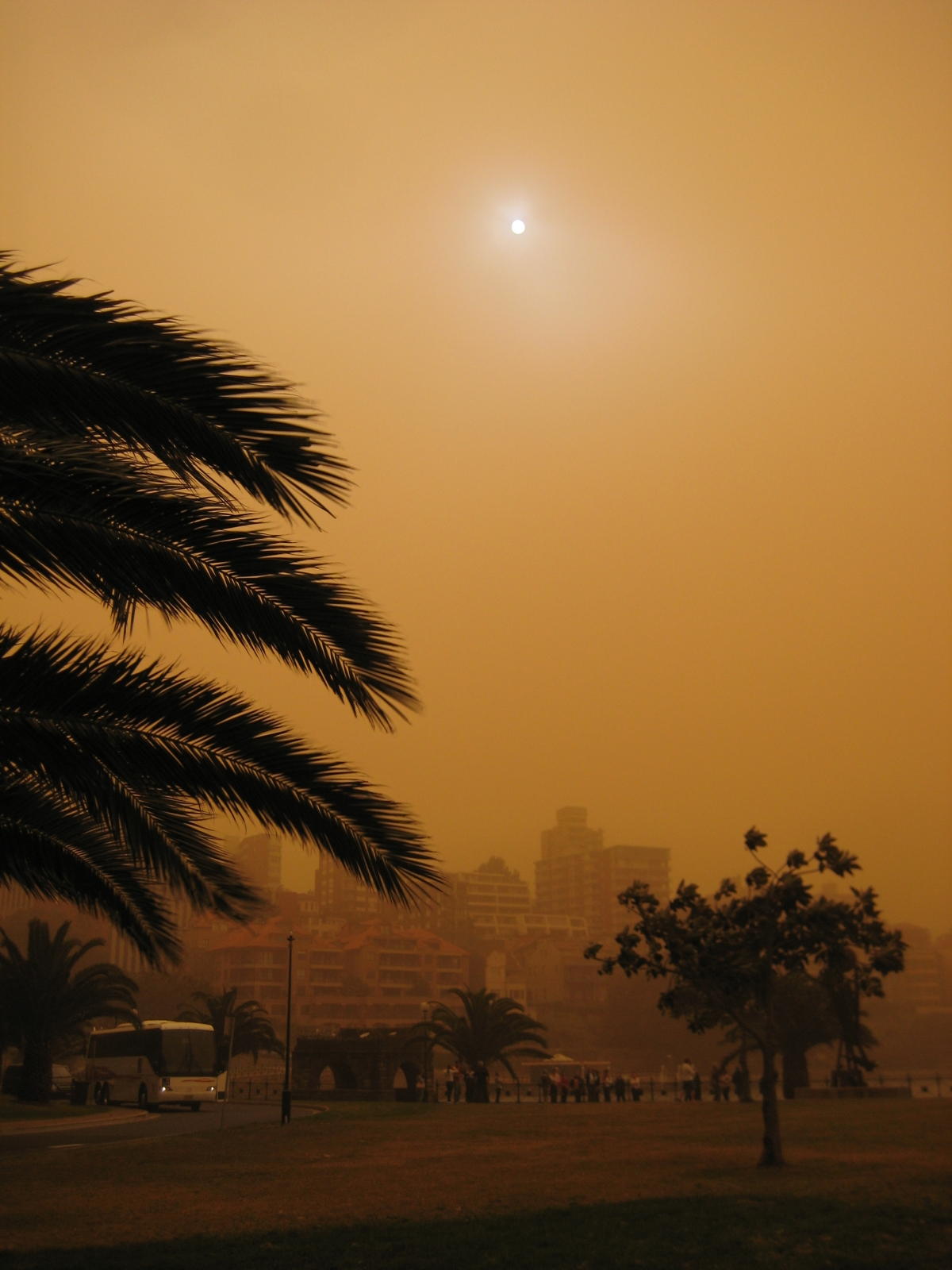
Kirribilli (Sydney Suburb), NSW

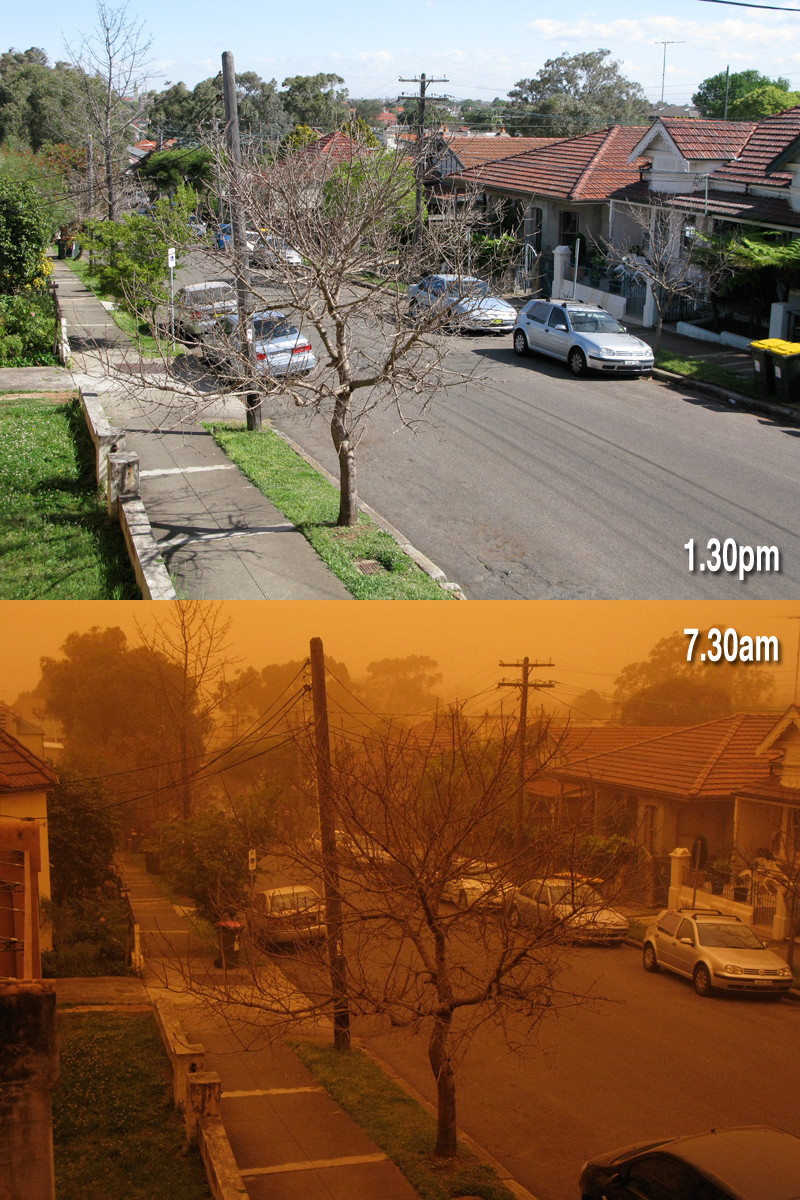
Mid-storm and post-storm contrast, Sydney, NSW

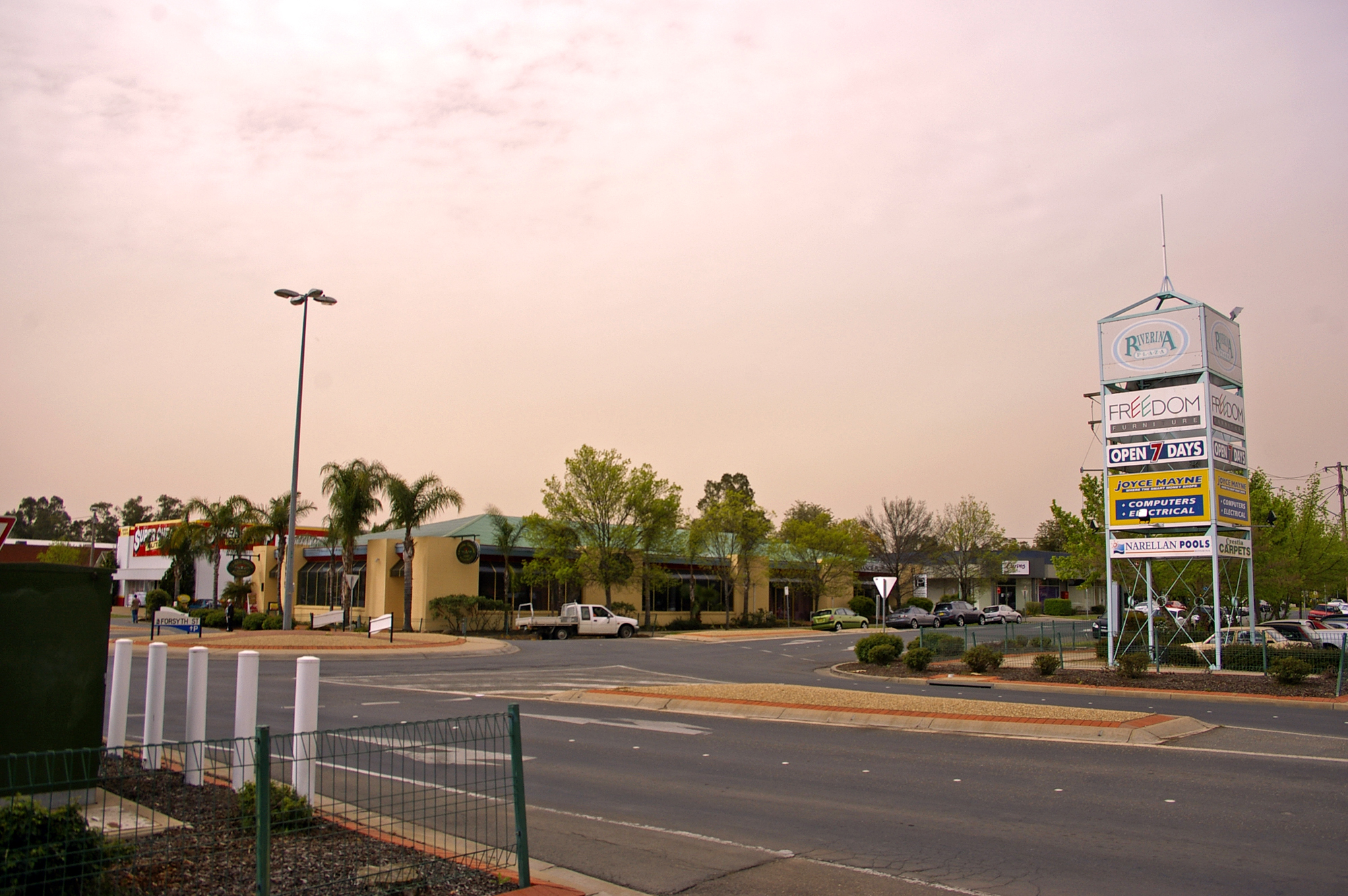
Wagga Wagga city centre, NSW

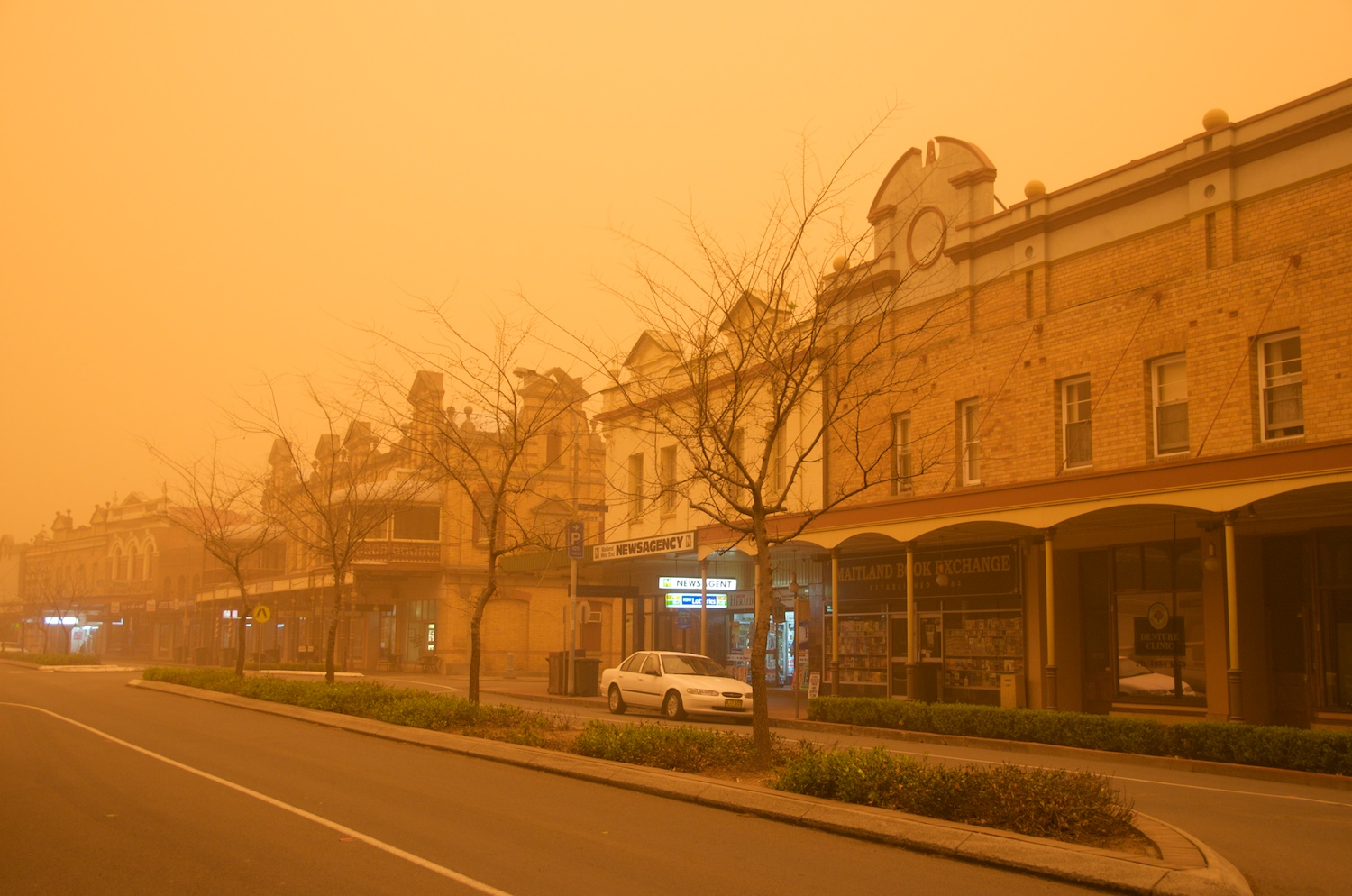
Maitland, NSW

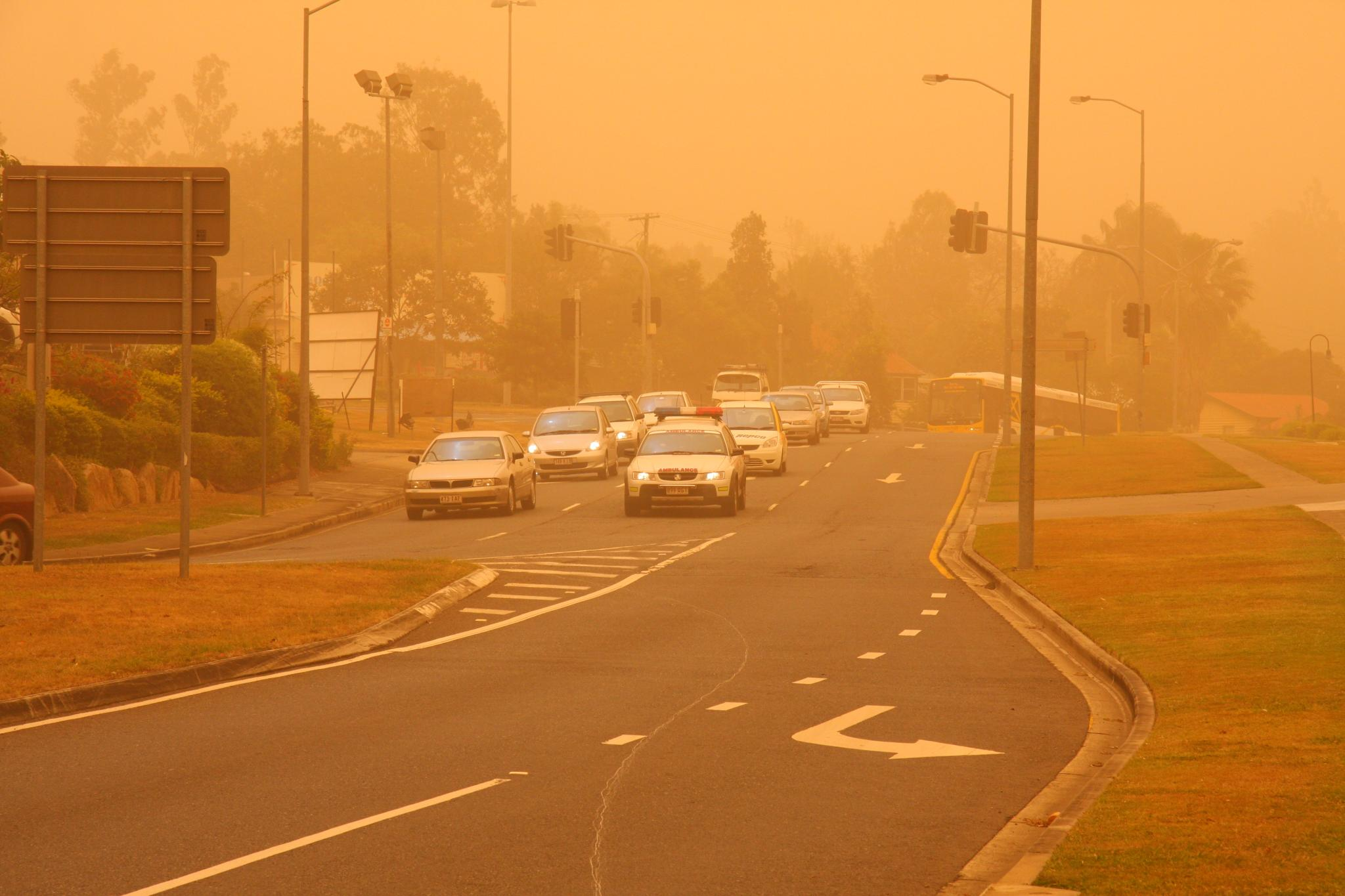
Indooroopilly
(Brisbane suburb), Qld

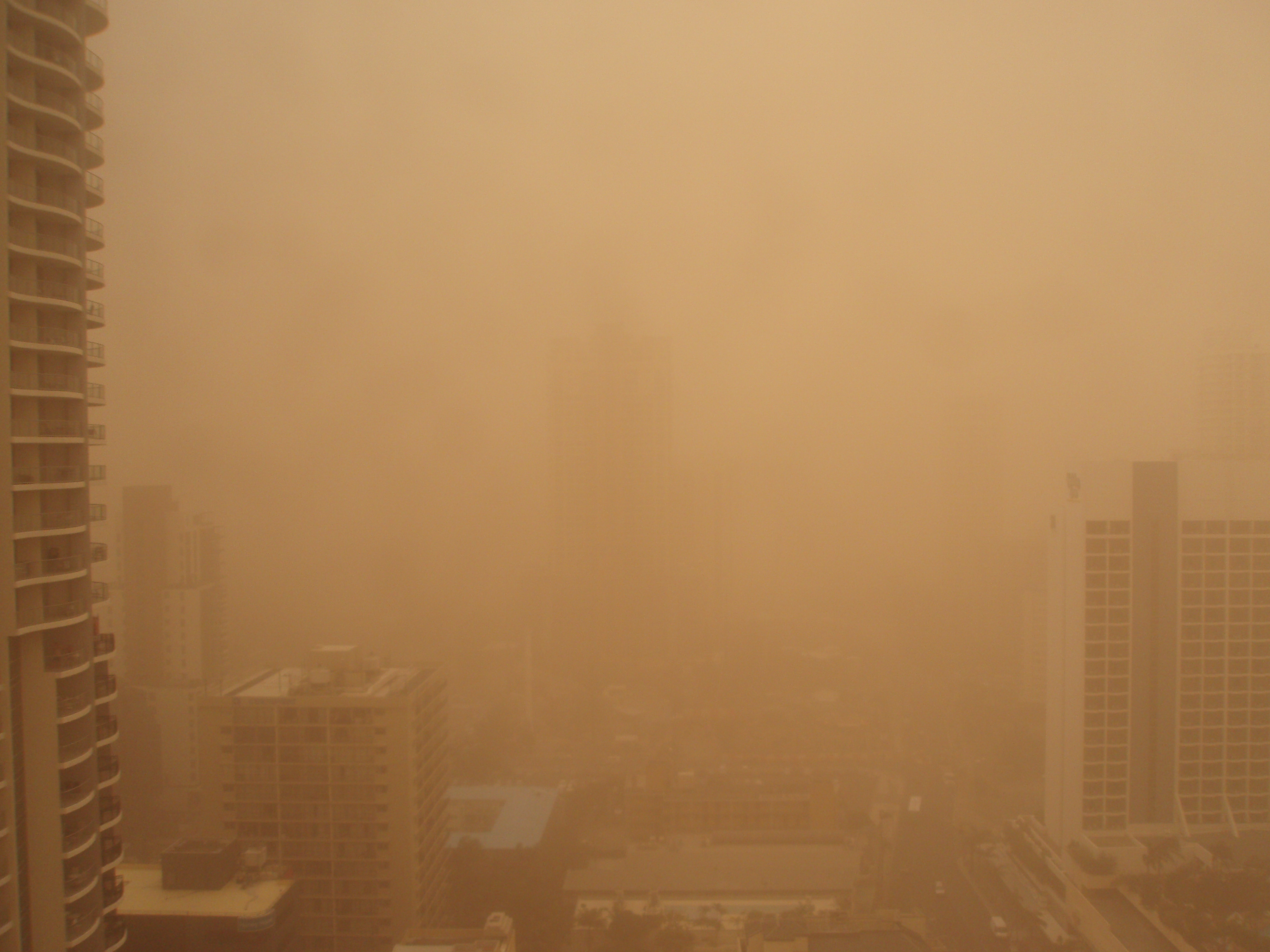
Surfers Paradise highrises, Qld

== See also ==
=== Related article ===
- 1983 Melbourne dust storm

=== External links ===
- Dust storm in Australia at The Big Picture
- "Some photographs from smh.com". smh.com.au. Archived from the original on 25 March 2010.
- In pictures: dust storm in Australia at The Daily Telegraph
- Dust over Eastern Australia at Earth Observatory (part of the NASA EOS Project Science Office)
- New South Wales Government – Department of Environment Climate Change and Water (EPA) – Hourly Air quality index (AQI) values (Current and Historical) with map
- Queensland Government – Environment and Resource Management – Hourly Air Quality Data (Current and Historical)
- DustWatch interactive dust map viewer
