= 1983 Melbourne dust storm =

Dust storm throughout Victoria, Australia

The 1983 Melbourne dust storm was a meteorological phenomenon that occurred during the afternoon of 8 February 1983, throughout much of Victoria, Australia and affected the state capital, Melbourne. Red soil, dust and sand from Central and Southeastern Australia was swept up in high winds and carried southeast through Victoria. The dust storm was one of the most dramatic consequences of the 1982/83 drought, at the time the worst in Australian history and is, in hindsight, viewed as a precursor to the Ash Wednesday bushfires which were to occur eight days later.

== Background ==
In late 1982 and early 1983, the El Niño weather cycle had brought record drought to almost all of eastern Australia, with Victoria's Mallee and northern Wimmera severely affected.

During the morning of Tuesday 8 February 1983, a strong but dry cold front began to cross Victoria, preceded by hot, gusty northerly winds. The loose topsoil in the Mallee and Wimmera was picked up by the wind and collected into a huge cloud of dust that heralded the cool change. At Horsham in western Victoria, raised dust was observed by 11:00am. Within an hour, it had obscured the sky.

Fed by the strong northerly, the temperature in Melbourne rose quickly and by 2:35pm it had reached 43.2 °C (109.8 °F), at that time a record February maximum. Around the same time, a dramatic red-brown cloud could be seen approaching the city.

The dust storm hit Melbourne just before 3:00pm, accompanied by a rapid drop in temperature and a fierce wind change that uprooted trees and damaged houses. Within minutes, visibility in the capital had plunged to 100 metres (330 ft). City workers huddled in doorways, covering their mouths from the choking dust, and traffic came to a standstill.

The worst of the storm was over by 4:00pm, when the wind speed dropped. The dust cloud was approximately 320 metres (1,050 ft) high when it struck Melbourne, but in other areas of Victoria it extended thousands of metres into the atmosphere.

It was estimated that about 50,000 tonnes of topsoil were stripped from the Mallee (approximately 1,000 tonnes of it being dumped on the city). The combined effect of drought and dust storm inflicted damage on the land that, according to the then President of the Victorian Farmers and Graziers' Association, would take up to 10 years and tens of millions of dollars to repair.

The exact weather pattern that had caused the dust storm was repeated one week later, when the Ash Wednesday fires caused enormous destruction and loss of life.

== See also ==
- Climate of Australia
- Extreme weather events in Melbourne
- 2009 Australian dust storm
- Dust Bowl
