= Extreme weather events in Melbourne =

Notable weather extremities in Melbourne

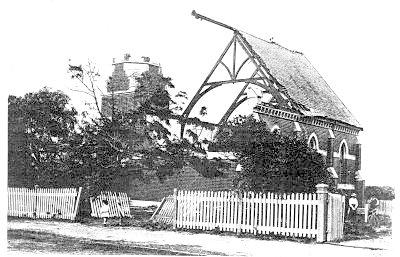
A church destroyed by the 1918 Brighton tornado

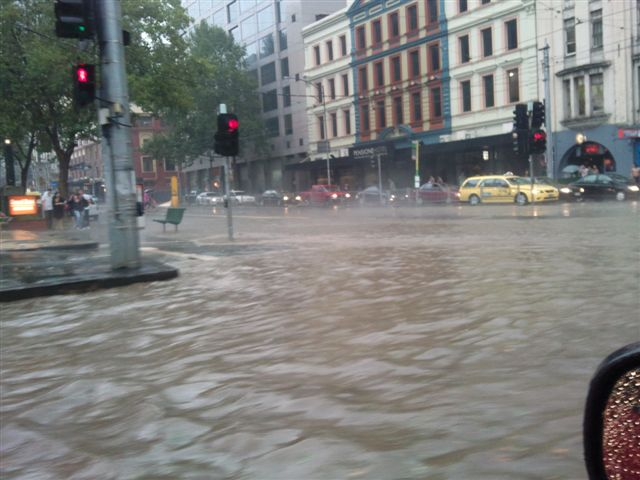
Flash flooding in the intersection of Flinders and Spencer Streets during the 2010 Melbourne thunderstorm.

Extreme weather events in Melbourne, Australia have occurred on multiple occasions. The city has experienced a number of highly unusual weather events and extremes of weather. An increase in heat waves and record breaking temperatures in the 21st century has led to much discussion over the effects of climate change in the country.

== List of weather events ==
- 31 August 1849 – A snowstorm blankets Melbourne (with accumulation on the streets).
- 1863 – A major flood puts Port Melbourne underwater leaving thousands homeless across the city and drowning one man at Princes Bridge.
- 26 July 1882 – Snow falls for half an hour in Melbourne.
- 1882 – Elizabeth Street in Melbourne is flooded.
- 1891 – The great flood causes the Yarra River to swell to 305 metres (1,001 ft) in width. The most significant flood in Melbourne's recorded history, it forces thousands to vacate their homes and caused at least one death.
- 1908 – A heatwave strikes Melbourne.
- 2 February 1918 – The Brighton tornado, an EF3 class and the most intense tornado to hit a major Australian city, strikes the bayside suburb of Brighton.
- April 1923 – Melbourne records no rain for the entire month. This would remain as the only rainless month in Melbourne's 170 years of records.
- 29 November to 1 December 1934 -Torrential rainfall of up to 350 mm causes the Yarra River to become a raging torrent. Extensive damage with 35 dead, 250 injured, and 3,000 homeless.
- 13 January 1939 – Melbourne experiences its second-hottest temperature on record, 45.6 °C (114.1 °F), during a four-day nationwide heat wave in which the Black Friday bushfires destroy townships that are now Melbourne suburbs.
- 1951 – A moderate cover of snow blankets the central business district (CBD) and suburbs.
- 3 December 1954 – Record rainfall causes flooding in Elwood and Flemington with homes evacuated. Train lines are closed by landslides, basement level shops are flooded, and events are cancelled.
- 17 February 1972 – Elizabeth Street is flooded after 75 mm (3.0 in) of rain in 17 minutes, with dramatic pictures of cars floating and underwater in the central city.
- 7 April 1977 – Laverton smashed by 12 hour thunderstorm and breaks several Victorian rainfall records including most rainfall; in 2 hours (105 mm or 4.1 in), in 3 hours (137 mm or 5.4 in) and in 4 hours (153 mm or 6.0 in).
- 8 February 1983 – The city is enveloped by a massive dust storm that "turned day into night".
- 16 February 1983 – Melbourne is encircled by an arc of fire as the Ash Wednesday fires encroach on the city.
- 18 September 1984 – Storm causes flooding of 100 homes in the eastern suburbs.
- December 1990 – Heatwave causes 4 deaths.
- 26 December 1999 – Flash flooding damages 300 homes with the worst effect on Broadmeadows.
- December 2003 – Freak storms
- February 2005 – Freak storms
- January 2009 – A heatwave results in a record three successive days over 43 °C (109 °F). This is closely followed by Melbourne's hottest day on record on 7 February, when the temperature reached 46.4 °C (115.5 °F) in the CBD. This same heatwave triggers the Black Saturday bushfires, the worst in Australian history.
- 6 March 2010 – Storms pass directly over Melbourne bringing large hail, flash flooding and high winds, causing widespread damage across western and central Victoria, stopping all modes of transportation in Melbourne. CBD streets of Flinders, Spencer and Elizabeth are spectacularly flash flooded.
- 4 February 2011 – Severe rainstorm causes flash flooding in parts of Melbourne.
- 10 November 2011 – Severe storm causes flash flooding in Croydon and Frankston.
- 25 December 2011 – Severe thunderstorms, large hailstones, flash flooding, and reports of tornadoes cause major damage to houses and vehicles in the worst-hit areas of Fiskville, Melton, Taylors Lakes, and Keilor Downs.
- 4–12 March 2013 – Melbourne faces a 10-day heatwave.
- 14–17 January 2014 – Melbourne records four consecutive days of temperatures exceeding 41 °C (106 °F), two of which exceed 43 °C (109 °F).
- 21 November 2016 – Thunderstorm asthma kills 9 and hospitalises hundreds, high heat and humidity cause thunderstorms to form northwest of the city, due to excessive grass growth in the north and west of Melbourne these storms send pollen into Melbourne and its suburbs raising pollen counts and triggering thousands of severe asthma attacks. The massive number of attacks overloaded emergency services and contributed to the fatalities.
- 30 December 2016 - Melbourne sets its record high all time dewpoint for any month at the time, with a dew point of 24.0 °C (75.2 °F).
- 14 December 2018 - Flash flooding with roughly 30 mm of rain falling within 15 minutes before 5:45 p.m, during rush hour, flooding roads in inner Melbourne along with other various suburbs while shutting down most tram lines and train lines in Melbourne's East
- 22 January 2020 - Brown rain falls in Victoria as dust storm and rain clouds collide - A dust storm picked up by a front moving through Victoria has led to a downpour of "dirty rain" across Melbourne, forcing public swimming pools to close and leaving cars looking like they have been "sprayed with mud".
- 4 August 2020 - A cold front brings snow down to as low as 150 metres (490 ft) above sea level around midday, resulting in rare light dustings in many of Melbourne's suburbs, most notably in its north western suburbs Craigieburn, Sunbury, Wallan (amongst others). These suburbs had not received snow in decades. Snow was also recorded on the higher levels of Melbourne CBD highrises.
- On the 27th of August 2020 there were severe storms across Melbourne and southern Victoria. 3 people were killed including a 4-year-old boy. 200,000 residents in 101 suburbs were put under a boil water notice which was lifted 4 days later.
- 9-10 June 2021 - heavy rains (over 270 mm, 11 in in the Dandenong Ranges east of Melbourne) caused significant riverine flooding. Overnight, strong winds from the south east, a very unusual direction for that area, gusting over 100 km/h (62 mph), brought down thousands of trees across the eastern suburbs, with the Dandenongs particularly badly hit. Almost 400 houses were damaged, 23,000 homes lost power for up to 5 days and around 1,700 were without power for over a month.
- January 2022 - Melbourne had a hot and humid summer, with 17 days above 30 degrees C (86 degrees F). The last time this happened was 1974. Melbourne also had a run of seven days above 30 degrees C (86 degrees F), this is the first time since March 2013. Also in January, the nights were warm averaging 18.3 degrees C (64.9 degrees F). This is the warmest average minimum month since the records began in 1855.
- 25 October 2022 - heavy rains lash Lilydale in Melbourne's outer east, with 70 mm (2.8 in) falling on the suburb in one hour. Flash flooding affected numerous homes and 25 rescues were required as people became stranded after attempted to drive through flood waters.
- September 2023 - Melbourne records its warmest and driest September on record, with records going back to 168 years. Melbourne's maximum temperature averaged 20.1 °C (68.2 °F), which was 2.8°C (5.04°F) degrees above average, and had only 10.8 mm (0.43 in) of rain for the month.
- 13 February 2024 - Severe thunderstorms sweep the state, causing power outages to over half a million households across Victoria. Public transportation services around metropolitan Melbourne are also heavily disrupted as multiple train lines suffer damage from the storms. 1 person died in these storms while on a farm in Mirboo North.
- March 2024 - Melbourne experiences its driest March on record, with just 2.8 mm (0.11 in) recorded.

== Highest and lowest temperatures ==
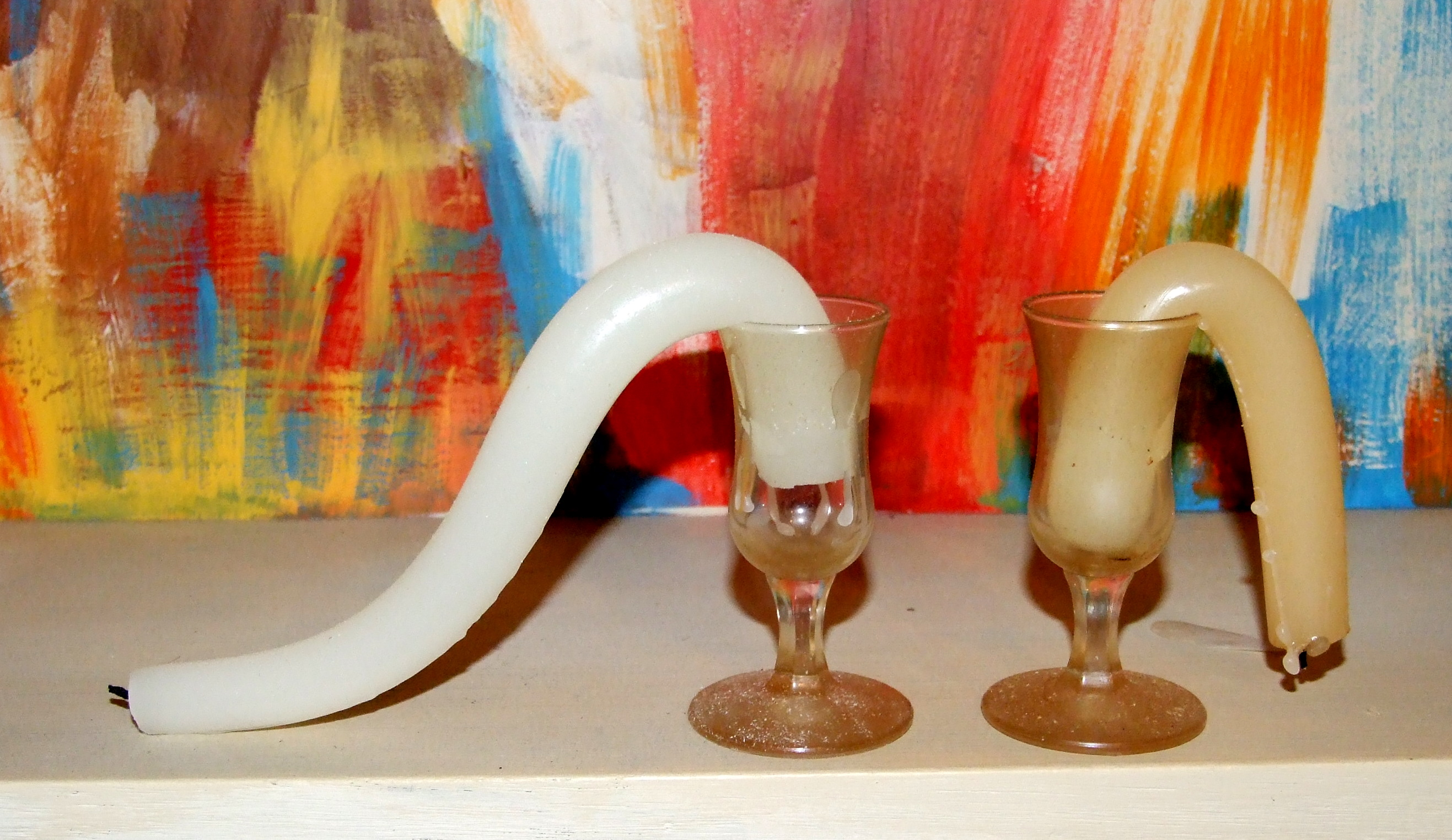
Candles suffering the effects of Melbourne's hottest recorded temperature of 46.4 °C (115.5 °F) on 7 February 2009

Many of the hottest days recorded in Melbourne occurred during major heatwaves which precipitated large firestorms:

- 47.2 °C (117.0 °F) (Anecdotal) – 6 February 1851 (Black Thursday)
- 46.4 °C (115.5 °F) – 7 February 2009 (Black Saturday)
- 46.0 °C (114.8 °F) – 25 January 2019 (At Melbourne Airport)
- 45.8 °C (114.4 °F) – 31 January 1968 (At Essendon Airport)
- 45.6 °C (114.1 °F) – 13 January 1939 (Black Friday)

Melbourne's warmest overnight temperature was 30.5 °C (86.9 °F) on 1 February 1902.

Melbourne's coldest daytime temperature was 4.4 °C (39.9 °F) on 4 July 1901.

Melbourne's coldest temperature ever was −2.8 °C (27.0 °F) on 21 July 1869.

== See also ==
- Severe storms in Australia
- Southerly buster
- Climate of Melbourne
