= Climate of Melbourne =

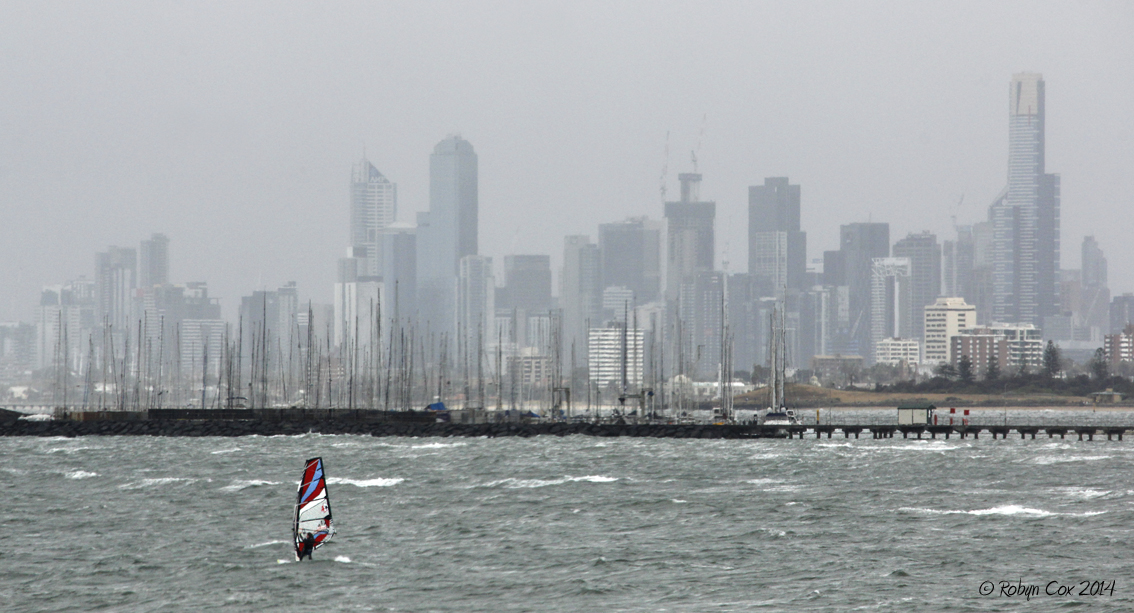
Summer rain over Melbourne, taken from Brighton

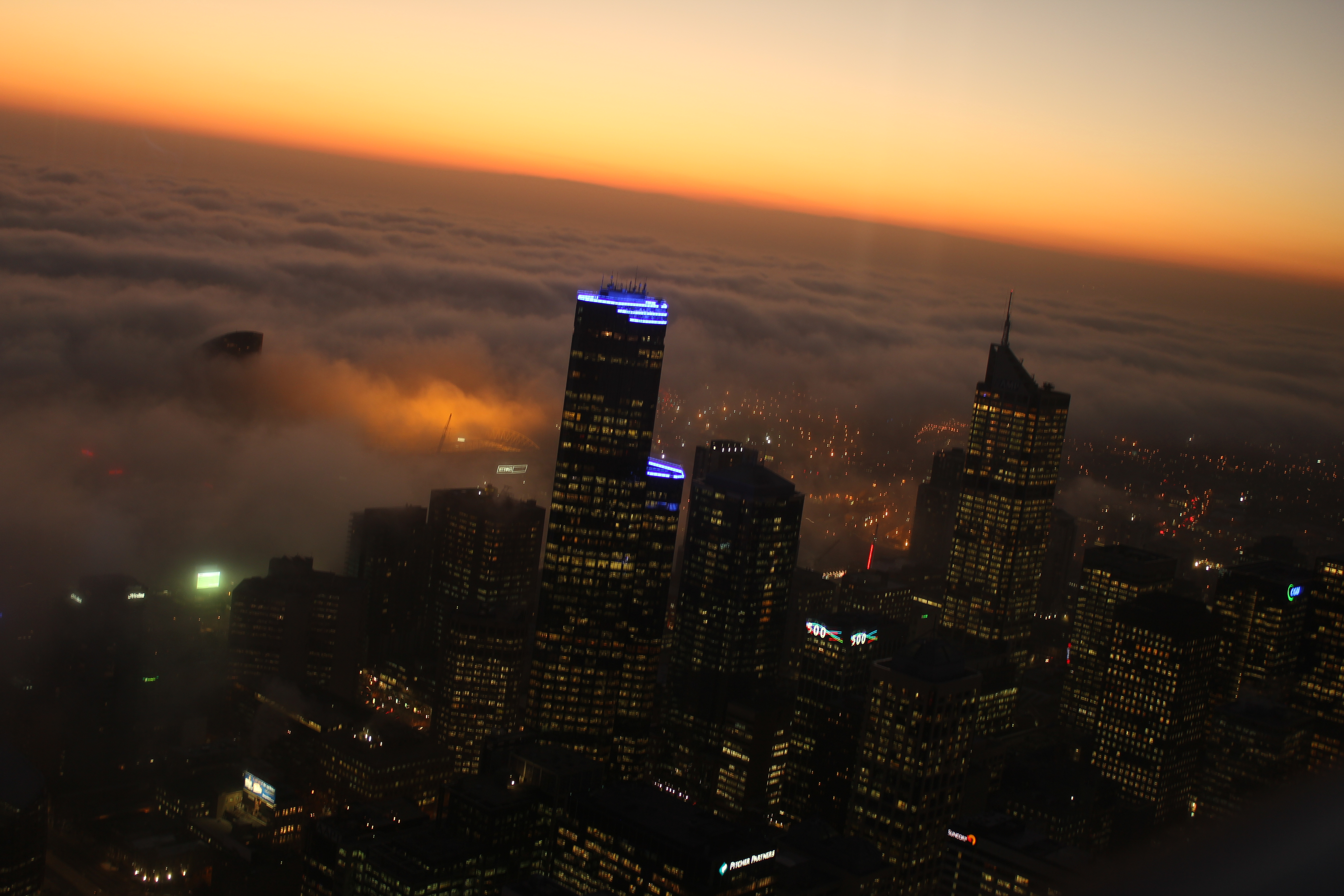
Winter fog over the Melbourne city centre

Melbourne, the state capital of Victoria and the second most populous city in Australia (most populous in urban area), has either a temperate oceanic (Köppen: Cfb), or humid subtropical (Trewartha: Cf) climate, with warm summers and cool, damp winters. Melbourne is well known for its changeable weather conditions, mainly due to it being located on the boundary of hot inland areas and the cool southern ocean. This temperature differential is most pronounced in the spring and summer months and can cause strong cold fronts to form. These cold fronts can be responsible for varied forms of severe weather from gales to thunderstorms and hail, large temperature drops and heavy rain. Winters, while exceptionally dry by southern Victorian standards, are often cloudy. The lack of winter rainfall is owed to Melbourne's rain shadowed location between the Otway and Macedon Ranges, which block much of the rainfall arriving from the north and west.

Port Phillip is often warmer than the surrounding oceans or the land mass, particularly in spring and autumn; this can set up a "bay effect rain", where showers are intensified leeward of the bay. Relatively narrow streams of heavy showers can often affect the same places (usually the eastern suburbs) for an extended period, while the rest of Melbourne and surrounds stays dry. Overall, the area around Melbourne is, owing to its rain shadow, nonetheless significantly drier than average for southern Victoria. Within the city and surrounds, rainfall varies widely, from around 425 mm (17 in) at Little River to 1,250 mm (49 in) on the eastern fringe at Gembrook. Melbourne receives 48.6 clear days annually. Dewpoint temperatures in the summer range from 9.5 to 11.7 °C (49.1 to 53.1 °F).

Melbourne rarely receives widespread or continuous rainfall (as experienced in other Australian cities, such as Sydney or Brisbane) and instead experiences precipitation through fleeting showers that can vary in intensity, Melbourne is particularly prone to these isolated convective showers forming when a cold pool crosses the state, especially if there is considerable daytime heating. These showers are often heavy and can include hail, squalls, and significant drops in temperature, but they often pass through very quickly with a rapid clearing trend to sunny and relatively calm weather and the temperature rising back to what it was before the shower. This can occur in the space of minutes and can be repeated many times a day, giving Melbourne a reputation for having "four seasons in one day", a phrase that is part of local popular culture. The lowest temperature on record is −2.8 °C (27.0 °F), on 21 July 1869. The highest temperature recorded in Melbourne city was 46.4 °C (115.5 °F), on 7 February 2009. While snow is occasionally seen at higher elevations in the outskirts of the city, and dustings were observed in 2020, it has not been recorded in the Central Business District since 1986.

The sea temperature in Melbourne is warmer than the surrounding ocean during the summer months, and colder during the winter months. This is predominantly due to Port Phillip Bay being an enclosed and shallow bay that is largely protected from the ocean, resulting in greater temperature variation across seasons.

== Overview ==
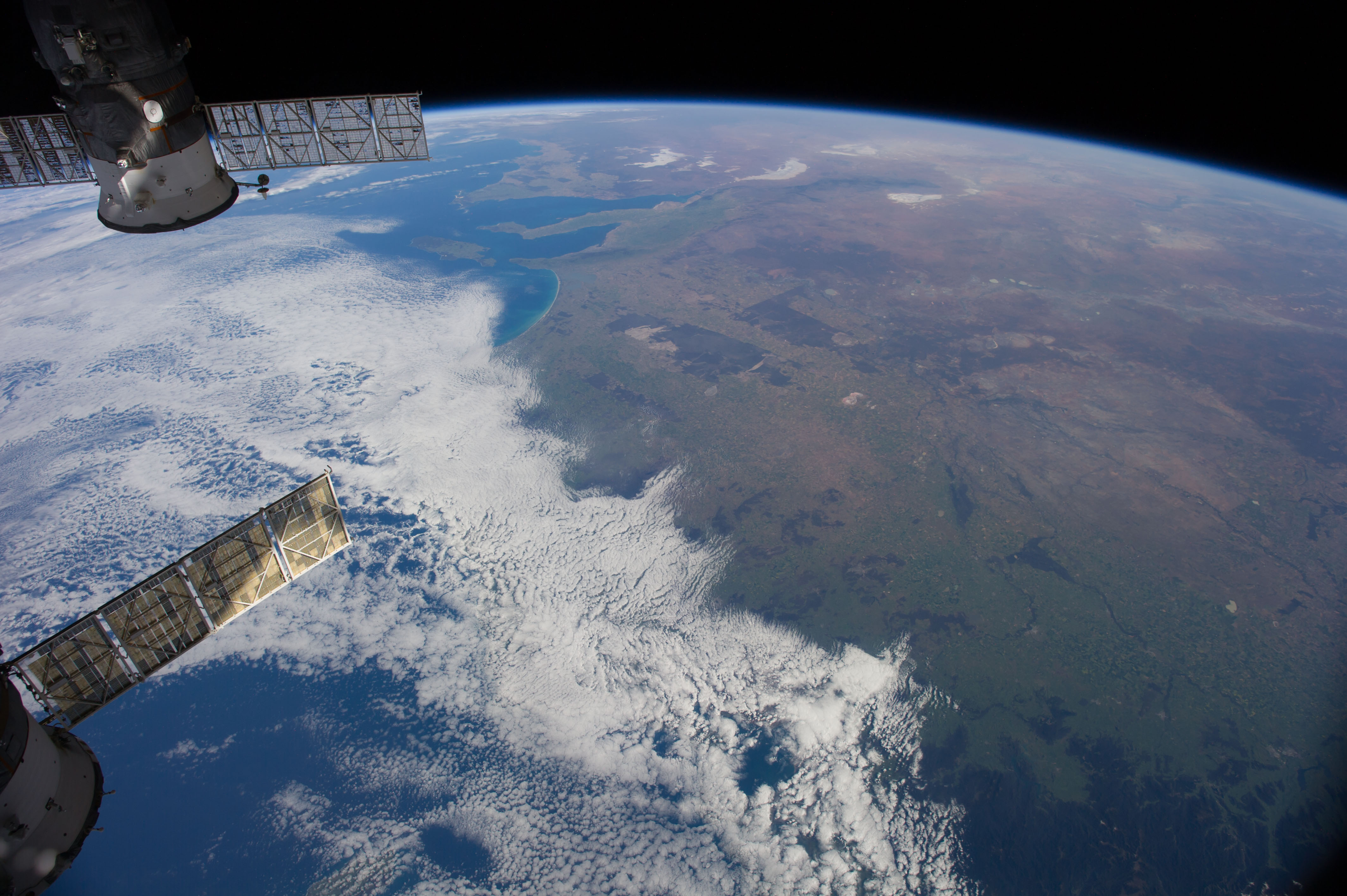
Cloud cover over Melbourne and southern Victoria

The shallow and enclosed Port Phillip Bay is often warmer than the surrounding landmass and the oceanic waters of Bass Strait (particularly in spring and autumn), and this can set up a "bay effect" similar to the lake effect seen in colder regions, where showers are intensified leeward of the bay. Relatively narrow streams of heavy showers can often affect the same places (usually in the southeastern suburbs) for an extended period, while the rest of Melbourne and surrounding suburbs stays dry.

Overall, Melbourne is, owing to the rain shadowing by the Otway Ranges, nonetheless drier than average for southern Victoria. Within the city and surrounds, however, rainfall varies widely, from around 485 mm (19 in) on the western fringe at Little River to 1,020 mm (40 in) on the eastern fringe at Gembrook. Despite its relative dryness, Melbourne has 139 days of rain per year on the 0.2 mm (0.0079 in) threshold, meaning that its precipitation commonly falls as drizzles or as light showers (which frequently occur in the winter months), rather than heavy downpours (such as those generally experienced in Sydney, Brisbane and Perth).

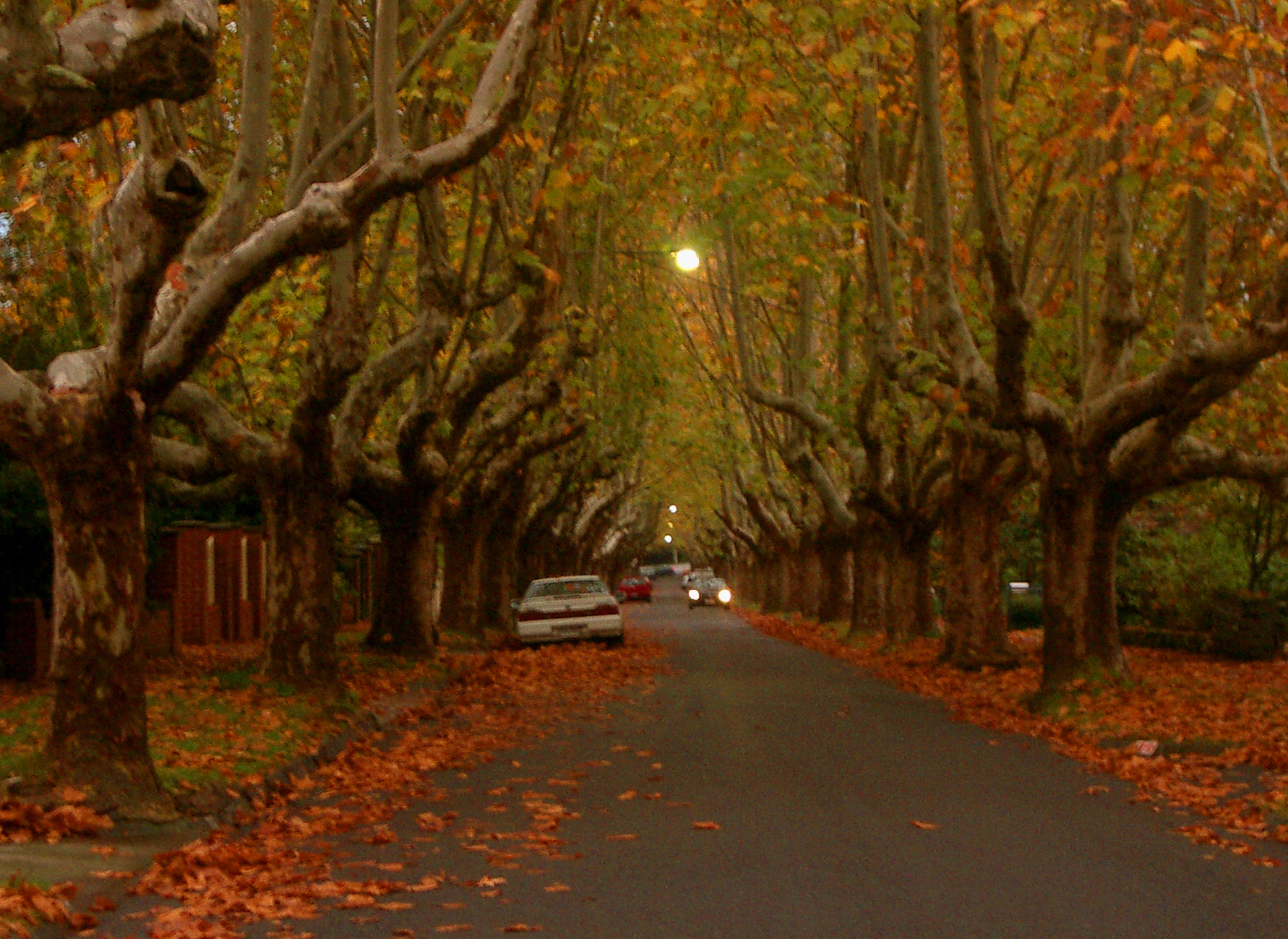
Autumn in the Melbourne suburb of Canterbury

The city receives only 48.6 clear days annually, making it the cloudiest capital city in Australia, and it has 180 overcast days annually, with 54 more cloudy days than Queenscliff to the south of the city, and 19 more than Mount Buller to the north. In comparison, Brisbane has 42 cloudy days annually, Sydney 134 and Hobart 174. According to the Bureau of Meteorology senior forecaster Terry Ryan, the excess cloud cover is caused by a meteorological phenomenon known as "anticyclonic gloom", where high-pressure systems in winter to the city's north and west conjure a layer of warm air at a high altitude, which holds moisture from Bass Strait. The cloudiest month in Melbourne is May, with an average of 18 cloudy days, followed by July, June and August, respectively.

Melbourne is also prone to isolated convective showers forming when a cold pool crosses the state, especially if there is considerable daytime heating. These showers are often heavy and can contain hails and squalls and significant drops in temperature, but they pass through very quickly at times with a rapid clearing trend to sunny and relatively calm weather and the temperature rising back to what it was before the shower. This often occurs in the space of minutes and can be repeated many times in a day, giving Melbourne a reputation for having "four seasons in one day", a phrase that is part of a local popular culture and familiar to many visitors to the city. Dewpoint temperatures in the summer range from 9.5 °C (49.1 °F) to 11.7 °C (53.1 °F).

Recorded extremes (From Melbourne Regional Office):

- Hottest temperature: 46.4 °C (115.5 °F), 7 February 2009
- Coldest temperature: −2.8 °C (27.0 °F), 21 July 1869
- Hottest Minimum: 30.5 °C (86.9 °F), 1 February 1902
- Coldest Maximum: 4.4 °C (39.9 °F), 4 July 1901
- Wettest month: 238.2 mm (9.38 in), February 1972
- Wettest 24 hours: 113.4 mm (4.46 in), 3 February 2005

A record high dew point of 24.0 °C (75.2 °F) was set on 30 December 2016.

== Summer ==
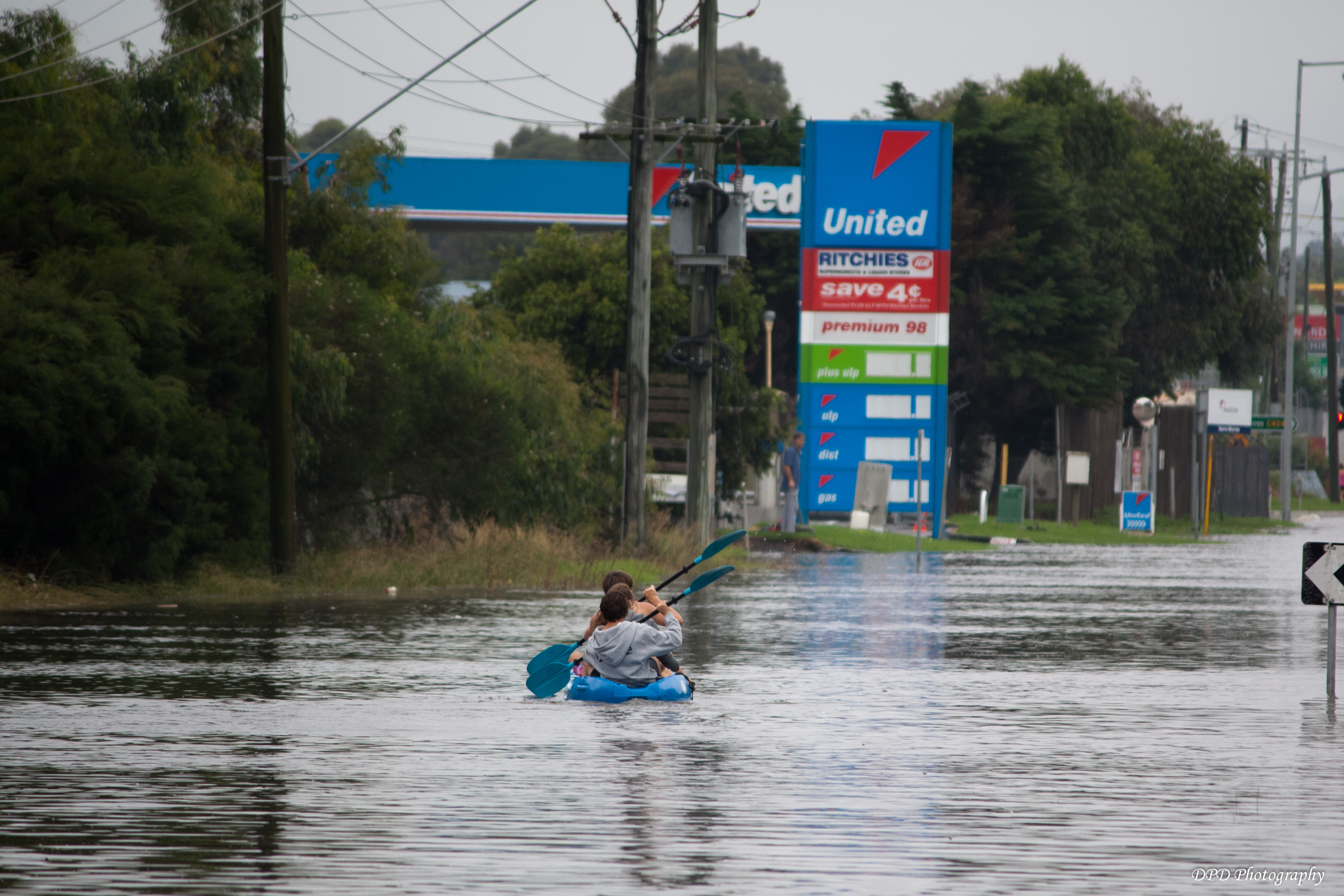
Summer flooding in the suburb of Narre Warren, February 2011

Melbourne summers are notable for occasional days of extreme heat, which have increased in frequency since 2005. This occurs when the synoptic pattern is conducive to the transportation of very hot air from central Australia over to the south-east corner of the continent. The inland deserts of Australia are amongst the hottest areas on earth, particularly the inland parts of north-west Australia.

Every summer, intense heat builds starting in the Pilbara district of Western Australia around October/November and spreading widely over the tropical and subtropical inland parts of the continent by January. In the summer months, the southern part of the continent straddles the westerly wind belt to the south and the subtropical high-pressure ridge to the north. The intense heat buildup occurs where high pressure is highly dominant in the upper levels of the atmosphere over the tropics and subtropics of Australia in summer allowing for a huge area of stable atmospheric conditions to predominate.

On occasion, a strong cold front will develop in summer and bring the westerlies further north than their mean summer position. On these occasions, north-west winds will develop ahead of the cold front's passage and sometimes these can be very strong, even gale force. When this occurs the hot air from the inland is dragged right down over south-east Australia, occasionally even as far as southern Tasmania.

As this air mass is carried entirely over the continental land mass it remains unmodified, i.e. it does not pick up additional moisture from a body of water and retains most if not all of its heat. On these occasions, the normally temperate parts of southern Victoria, including Melbourne, can experience the full fury of the desert climate albeit only briefly as the cold front responsible usually passes through relatively quickly afterwards allowing cool south-westerly winds off the Southern Ocean to replace the hot desert air. The highest temperature recorded in Melbourne city was 46.4 °C (115.5 °F), on 7 February 2009.

== Winter ==
Winters in Melbourne are cool with moderate rainfall. The lowest temperature on record is −2.8 °C (27.0 °F), on 21 July 1869. On 25 July 1986, snow fell in the city, which caused air traffic delays of up to four hours.

== Climate Data ==
Climate data for Melbourne CBD (1991–2015 averages, extremes 1910–2015)
Month	Jan	Feb	Mar	Apr	May	Jun	Jul	Aug	Sep	Oct	Nov	Dec	Year
Record high °C (°F)	45.6 (114.1)	46.4 (115.5)	41.7 (107.1)	34.9 (94.8)	28.1 (82.6)	22.4 (72.3)	23.3 (73.9)	26.5 (79.7)	31.4 (88.5)	36.9 (98.4)	40.7 (105.3)	42.9 (109.2)	46.4 (115.5)
Mean maximum °C (°F)	40.3 (104.5)	38.4 (101.1)	34.7 (94.5)	29.2 (84.6)	23.4 (74.1)	18.9 (66.0)	18.5 (65.3)	21.0 (69.8)	25.5 (77.9)	30.8 (87.4)	34.6 (94.3)	37.4 (99.3)	41.2 (106.2)
Mean daily maximum °C (°F)	27.0 (80.6)	26.9 (80.4)	24.6 (76.3)	21.1 (70.0)	17.6 (63.7)	15.1 (59.2)	14.5 (58.1)	15.9 (60.6)	18.1 (64.6)	20.5 (68.9)	22.9 (73.2)	24.8 (76.6)	20.8 (69.4)
Daily mean °C (°F)	21.5 (70.7)	21.6 (70.9)	19.6 (67.3)	16.5 (61.7)	13.7 (56.7)	11.7 (53.1)	11.0 (51.8)	11.9 (53.4)	13.8 (56.8)	15.7 (60.3)	17.9 (64.2)	19.6 (67.3)	16.2 (61.2)
Mean daily minimum °C (°F)	16.1 (61.0)	16.4 (61.5)	14.6 (58.3)	11.8 (53.2)	9.8 (49.6)	8.2 (46.8)	7.5 (45.5)	7.9 (46.2)	9.4 (48.9)	10.9 (51.6)	12.8 (55.0)	14.3 (57.7)	11.6 (52.9)
Mean minimum °C (°F)	11.4 (52.5)	11.8 (53.2)	9.7 (49.5)	6.4 (43.5)	4.4 (39.9)	3.1 (37.6)	2.9 (37.2)	3.0 (37.4)	4.4 (39.9)	5.8 (42.4)	7.9 (46.2)	9.5 (49.1)	2.1 (35.8)
Record low °C (°F)	6.7 (44.1)	4.5 (40.1)	4.1 (39.4)	1.9 (35.4)	−1.1 (30.0)	−1.1 (30.0)	−1.5 (29.3)	−1.5 (29.3)	−0.5 (31.1)	0.1 (32.2)	2.7 (36.9)	5.9 (42.6)	−1.5 (29.3)
Average rainfall mm (inches)	44.2 (1.74)	50.2 (1.98)	39.0 (1.54)	53.2 (2.09)	43.9 (1.73)	49.5 (1.95)	39.8 (1.57)	47.0 (1.85)	54.5 (2.15)	55.8 (2.20)	63.3 (2.49)	60.9 (2.40)	601.3 (23.69)
Average dew point °C (°F)	11.2 (52.2)	11.6 (52.9)	10.3 (50.5)	8.4 (47.1)	7.7 (45.9)	6.5 (43.7)	5.3 (41.5)	4.7 (40.5)	5.3 (41.5)	6.2 (43.2)	8.0 (46.4)	9.3 (48.7)	7.9 (46.2)
Source: Bureau of Meteorology

Climate data for Melbourne (Olympic Park) (1991–2020 averages, extremes 2013–present)
Month	Jan	Feb	Mar	Apr	May	Jun	Jul	Aug	Sep	Oct	Nov	Dec	Year
Record high °C (°F)	43.4 (110.1)	40.7 (105.3)	38.9 (102.0)	33.1 (91.6)	26.7 (80.1)	20.4 (68.7)	23.8 (74.8)	23.8 (74.8)	30.6 (87.1)	35.8 (96.4)	40.9 (105.6)	43.5 (110.3)	43.5 (110.3)
Mean maximum °C (°F)	35.8 (96.4)	34.3 (93.7)	31.4 (88.5)	26.3 (79.3)	22.0 (71.6)	18.2 (64.8)	17.5 (63.5)	19.1 (66.4)	23.3 (73.9)	27.2 (81.0)	31.0 (87.8)	33.6 (92.5)	35.8 (96.4)
Mean daily maximum °C (°F)	26.6 (79.9)	26.5 (79.7)	24.5 (76.1)	21.0 (69.8)	17.5 (63.5)	14.6 (58.3)	14.1 (57.4)	15.3 (59.5)	17.5 (63.5)	19.8 (67.6)	22.3 (72.1)	24.3 (75.7)	20.3 (68.6)
Daily mean °C (°F)	21.1 (70.0)	21.1 (70.0)	19.4 (66.9)	16.3 (61.3)	13.6 (56.5)	11.3 (52.3)	10.7 (51.3)	11.6 (52.9)	13.3 (55.9)	15.1 (59.2)	17.3 (63.1)	19.1 (66.4)	15.8 (60.5)
Mean daily minimum °C (°F)	15.6 (60.1)	15.7 (60.3)	14.3 (57.7)	11.6 (52.9)	9.7 (49.5)	7.9 (46.2)	7.3 (45.1)	7.9 (46.2)	9.0 (48.2)	10.3 (50.5)	12.2 (54.0)	13.9 (57.0)	11.3 (52.3)
Mean minimum °C (°F)	11.6 (52.9)	11.9 (53.4)	10.3 (50.5)	8.1 (46.6)	6.2 (43.2)	4.5 (40.1)	4.1 (39.4)	4.4 (39.9)	5.4 (41.7)	6.5 (43.7)	8.2 (46.8)	9.7 (49.5)	4.1 (39.4)
Record low °C (°F)	8.6 (47.5)	9.2 (48.6)	7.1 (44.8)	4.4 (39.9)	2.4 (36.3)	0.6 (33.1)	−0.5 (31.1)	0.7 (33.3)	2.2 (36.0)	3.6 (38.5)	4.6 (40.3)	6.9 (44.4)	−0.5 (31.1)
Average rainfall mm (inches)	43.1 (1.70)	40.5 (1.59)	41.2 (1.62)	51.5 (2.03)	51.1 (2.01)	49.3 (1.94)	47.7 (1.88)	50.8 (2.00)	54.1 (2.13)	55.4 (2.18)	54.2 (2.13)	58.3 (2.30)	597.2 (23.51)
Source: Bureau of Meteorology.

Climate data for Melbourne Airport (1991–2020 averages, 1970–2022 extremes)
Month	Jan	Feb	Mar	Apr	May	Jun	Jul	Aug	Sep	Oct	Nov	Dec	Year
Record high °C (°F)	46.0 (114.8)	46.4 (115.5)	40.8 (105.4)	34.5 (94.1)	27.0 (80.6)	21.8 (71.2)	21.3 (70.3)	24.6 (76.3)	30.2 (86.4)	36.0 (96.8)	41.6 (106.9)	44.6 (112.3)	46.4 (115.5)
Mean maximum °C (°F)	40.4 (104.7)	38.2 (100.8)	34.7 (94.5)	28.8 (83.8)	22.7 (72.9)	18.0 (64.4)	17.3 (63.1)	19.8 (67.6)	24.6 (76.3)	30.2 (86.4)	34.3 (93.7)	37.6 (99.7)	41.3 (106.3)
Mean daily maximum °C (°F)	27.0 (80.6)	26.7 (80.1)	24.4 (75.9)	20.6 (69.1)	16.7 (62.1)	14.0 (57.2)	13.4 (56.1)	14.7 (58.5)	17.1 (62.8)	20.0 (68.0)	22.6 (72.7)	24.8 (76.6)	20.2 (68.3)
Daily mean °C (°F)	20.6 (69.1)	20.6 (69.1)	18.6 (65.5)	15.4 (59.7)	12.5 (54.5)	10.2 (50.4)	9.6 (49.3)	10.4 (50.7)	12.1 (53.8)	14.3 (57.7)	16.6 (61.9)	18.5 (65.3)	14.9 (58.8)
Mean daily minimum °C (°F)	14.2 (57.6)	14.4 (57.9)	12.8 (55.0)	10.1 (50.2)	8.3 (46.9)	6.4 (43.5)	5.8 (42.4)	6.0 (42.8)	7.2 (45.0)	8.7 (47.7)	10.6 (51.1)	12.3 (54.1)	9.7 (49.5)
Mean minimum °C (°F)	8.5 (47.3)	8.7 (47.7)	7.1 (44.8)	4.4 (39.9)	3.0 (37.4)	1.3 (34.3)	0.9 (33.6)	1.1 (34.0)	1.8 (35.2)	3.1 (37.6)	4.9 (40.8)	6.6 (43.9)	0.2 (32.4)
Record low °C (°F)	6.0 (42.8)	4.8 (40.6)	3.7 (38.7)	1.2 (34.2)	0.6 (33.1)	−0.9 (30.4)	−2.8 (27.0)	−2.5 (27.5)	−1.1 (30.0)	1.0 (33.8)	0.9 (33.6)	3.5 (38.3)	−2.8 (27.0)
Average precipitation mm (inches)	39.3 (1.55)	41.4 (1.63)	37.5 (1.48)	42.1 (1.66)	34.3 (1.35)	41.5 (1.63)	32.8 (1.29)	39.3 (1.55)	46.1 (1.81)	48.5 (1.91)	60.1 (2.37)	52.5 (2.07)	515.5 (20.30)
Average precipitation days (≥ 0.2 mm)	8.3	7.5	8.4	9.9	12.0	13.0	14.0	14.8	13.9	12.5	10.8	9.9	135.0
Average afternoon relative humidity (%)	44	45	46	50	59	65	63	57	53	49	47	45	52
Average dew point °C (°F)	9.7 (49.5)	10.3 (50.5)	8.9 (48.0)	7.4 (45.3)	7.1 (44.8)	6.3 (43.3)	5.2 (41.4)	4.7 (40.5)	5.3 (41.5)	5.7 (42.3)	7.4 (45.3)	8.0 (46.4)	7.2 (45.0)
Mean monthly sunshine hours	272.8	231.7	226.3	183.0	142.6	120.0	136.4	167.4	186.0	226.3	225.0	263.5	2,381
Percentage possible sunshine	61	61	59	56	46	43	45	51	52	56	53	58	53

Climate data for Mount Dandenong (Eastern Suburb)
Month	Jan	Feb	Mar	Apr	May	Jun	Jul	Aug	Sep	Oct	Nov	Dec	Year
Record high °C (°F)	37.3 (99.1)	39.3 (102.7)	33.6 (92.5)	28.0 (82.4)	20.3 (68.5)	15.0 (59.0)	16.0 (60.8)	20.0 (68.0)	22.7 (72.9)	28.7 (83.7)	33.2 (91.8)	36.2 (97.2)	39.3 (102.7)
Mean daily maximum °C (°F)	22.1 (71.8)	22.9 (73.2)	19.7 (67.5)	15.4 (59.7)	11.7 (53.1)	8.8 (47.8)	8.2 (46.8)	9.6 (49.3)	11.6 (52.9)	14.8 (58.6)	17.3 (63.1)	19.9 (67.8)	15.2 (59.4)
Mean daily minimum °C (°F)	11.5 (52.7)	12.6 (54.7)	11.3 (52.3)	9.0 (48.2)	6.0 (42.8)	4.4 (39.9)	3.6 (38.5)	4.2 (39.6)	5.0 (41.0)	6.8 (44.2)	8.3 (46.9)	9.8 (49.6)	7.8 (46.0)
Record low °C (°F)	4.0 (39.2)	4.7 (40.5)	3.7 (38.7)	0.7 (33.3)	−0.4 (31.3)	−1.0 (30.2)	−2.3 (27.9)	−2.0 (28.4)	−1.8 (28.8)	−0.6 (30.9)	0.5 (32.9)	2.3 (36.1)	−2.3 (27.9)
Average rainfall mm (inches)	70.2 (2.76)	61.2 (2.41)	74.6 (2.94)	102.0 (4.02)	129.6 (5.10)	98.4 (3.87)	95.5 (3.76)	116.8 (4.60)	106.0 (4.17)	104.8 (4.13)	109.4 (4.31)	95.7 (3.77)	1,164.2 (45.84)
Average rainy days (≥ 0.2mm)	12.1	8.4	12.4	13.7	18.2	17.8	20.0	19.7	17.5	16.5	15.2	12.9	184.4
Source: Bureau of Meteorology

Climate data for Laverton (Western Suburb)
Month	Jan	Feb	Mar	Apr	May	Jun	Jul	Aug	Sep	Oct	Nov	Dec	Year
Record high °C (°F)	45.0 (113.0)	47.5 (117.5)	41.5 (106.7)	35.5 (95.9)	27.3 (81.1)	24.3 (75.7)	23.5 (74.3)	26.8 (80.2)	31.2 (88.2)	37.4 (99.3)	40.3 (104.5)	44.3 (111.7)	47.5 (117.5)
Mean daily maximum °C (°F)	25.7 (78.3)	25.5 (77.9)	23.6 (74.5)	20.2 (68.4)	16.8 (62.2)	14.2 (57.6)	13.7 (56.7)	14.9 (58.8)	17.0 (62.6)	19.2 (66.6)	21.5 (70.7)	23.8 (74.8)	19.7 (67.5)
Mean daily minimum °C (°F)	13.7 (56.7)	14.2 (57.6)	12.5 (54.5)	9.8 (49.6)	7.7 (45.9)	5.8 (42.4)	5.0 (41.0)	5.5 (41.9)	6.6 (43.9)	8.2 (46.8)	10.2 (50.4)	12.0 (53.6)	9.3 (48.7)
Record low °C (°F)	5.2 (41.4)	5.0 (41.0)	2.7 (36.9)	0.3 (32.5)	−0.9 (30.4)	−3.3 (26.1)	−4.4 (24.1)	−3.7 (25.3)	−1.7 (28.9)	−1.0 (30.2)	0.8 (33.4)	3.6 (38.5)	−4.4 (24.1)
Average rainfall mm (inches)	39.3 (1.55)	47.4 (1.87)	35.3 (1.39)	45.1 (1.78)	46.6 (1.83)	38.7 (1.52)	38.7 (1.52)	44.7 (1.76)	49.4 (1.94)	56.7 (2.23)	53.1 (2.09)	45.9 (1.81)	540.9 (21.29)
Average rainy days (≥ 0.2mm)	7.3	7.2	8.7	10.9	13.8	14.1	15.3	15.7	14.7	14.3	11.9	9.9	143.8
Source: Bureau of Meteorology

Climate data for Viewbank (North-Eastern Suburb)
Month	Jan	Feb	Mar	Apr	May	Jun	Jul	Aug	Sep	Oct	Nov	Dec	Year
Record high °C (°F)	44.8 (112.6)	46.7 (116.1)	39.9 (103.8)	34.5 (94.1)	27.0 (80.6)	23.5 (74.3)	22.1 (71.8)	23.7 (74.7)	31.0 (87.8)	36.0 (96.8)	41.5 (106.7)	43.6 (110.5)	46.7 (116.1)
Mean daily maximum °C (°F)	28.2 (82.8)	27.5 (81.5)	25.3 (77.5)	21.3 (70.3)	17.2 (63.0)	14.4 (57.9)	14.0 (57.2)	15.1 (59.2)	17.8 (64.0)	20.5 (68.9)	24.0 (75.2)	25.8 (78.4)	20.9 (69.6)
Mean daily minimum °C (°F)	14.7 (58.5)	14.5 (58.1)	12.9 (55.2)	10.2 (50.4)	7.9 (46.2)	6.2 (43.2)	6.0 (42.8)	6.3 (43.3)	7.8 (46.0)	9.0 (48.2)	11.4 (52.5)	12.7 (54.9)	10.0 (50.0)
Record low °C (°F)	5.2 (41.4)	7.2 (45.0)	2.8 (37.0)	−0.1 (31.8)	−0.4 (31.3)	−1.3 (29.7)	−2.8 (27.0)	−2.7 (27.1)	−0.5 (31.1)	0.7 (33.3)	3.7 (38.7)	4.9 (40.8)	−2.8 (27.0)
Average precipitation mm (inches)	45.5 (1.79)	43.7 (1.72)	43.6 (1.72)	62.0 (2.44)	53.8 (2.12)	55.8 (2.20)	47.1 (1.85)	56.4 (2.22)	55.9 (2.20)	65.1 (2.56)	73.8 (2.91)	65.9 (2.59)	668.6 (26.32)
Average precipitation days (≥ 1.0 mm)	5.5	4.8	5.7	7.2	8.7	9.5	10.0	11.0	9.0	9.4	8.2	7.0	96.0
Source: Australian Bureau of Meteorology; Viewbank

Climate data for Essendon (Northern suburb)
Month	Jan	Feb	Mar	Apr	May	Jun	Jul	Aug	Sep	Oct	Nov	Dec	Year
Record high °C (°F)	45.8 (114.4)	47.3 (117.1)	40.7 (105.3)	35.2 (95.4)	26.7 (80.1)	22.6 (72.7)	21.9 (71.4)	24.4 (75.9)	30.3 (86.5)	36.4 (97.5)	41.5 (106.7)	44.0 (111.2)	47.3 (117.1)
Mean daily maximum °C (°F)	26.6 (79.9)	25.9 (78.6)	24.2 (75.6)	20.2 (68.4)	16.4 (61.5)	13.8 (56.8)	13.1 (55.6)	14.4 (57.9)	16.8 (62.2)	19.5 (67.1)	21.9 (71.4)	24.6 (76.3)	19.8 (67.6)
Mean daily minimum °C (°F)	13.7 (56.7)	14.0 (57.2)	12.6 (54.7)	10.0 (50.0)	7.9 (46.2)	6.0 (42.8)	5.4 (41.7)	5.7 (42.3)	6.8 (44.2)	8.4 (47.1)	10.1 (50.2)	12.0 (53.6)	9.4 (48.9)
Record low °C (°F)	5.7 (42.3)	5.3 (41.5)	3.7 (38.7)	0.6 (33.1)	0.1 (32.2)	−3.3 (26.1)	−2.6 (27.3)	−2.4 (27.7)	−1.6 (29.1)	−0.3 (31.5)	2.2 (36.0)	4.0 (39.2)	−3.3 (26.1)
Average rainfall mm (inches)	42.2 (1.66)	44.9 (1.77)	38.9 (1.53)	53.7 (2.11)	48.7 (1.92)	40.3 (1.59)	43.1 (1.70)	48.0 (1.89)	50.8 (2.00)	58.5 (2.30)	58.4 (2.30)	51.9 (2.04)	579.4 (22.81)
Average rainy days (≥ 0.2mm)	7.3	7.3	8.8	11.0	13.3	13.5	15.2	15.6	14.3	13.0	11.8	10.2	141.3
Source: Bureau of Meteorology

Climate data for Mornington (Southern coastal suburb)
Month	Jan	Feb	Mar	Apr	May	Jun	Jul	Aug	Sep	Oct	Nov	Dec	Year
Record high °C (°F)	40.2 (104.4)	41.6 (106.9)	37.4 (99.3)	30.7 (87.3)	25.7 (78.3)	19.3 (66.7)	19.3 (66.7)	23.3 (73.9)	26.1 (79.0)	29.4 (84.9)	35.1 (95.2)	38.7 (101.7)	41.6 (106.9)
Mean daily maximum °C (°F)	25.0 (77.0)	25.0 (77.0)	23.3 (73.9)	19.4 (66.9)	16.2 (61.2)	13.5 (56.3)	12.8 (55.0)	13.8 (56.8)	15.9 (60.6)	18.1 (64.6)	20.3 (68.5)	23.1 (73.6)	18.9 (66.0)
Mean daily minimum °C (°F)	13.4 (56.1)	13.9 (57.0)	12.9 (55.2)	10.9 (51.6)	9.1 (48.4)	7.2 (45.0)	6.5 (43.7)	6.9 (44.4)	8.1 (46.6)	9.5 (49.1)	10.7 (51.3)	12.1 (53.8)	10.1 (50.2)
Record low °C (°F)	7.3 (45.1)	7.4 (45.3)	2.5 (36.5)	3.8 (38.8)	0.6 (33.1)	−0.6 (30.9)	−1.2 (29.8)	−0.1 (31.8)	−0.6 (30.9)	3.4 (38.1)	4.5 (40.1)	6.6 (43.9)	−1.2 (29.8)
Average rainfall mm (inches)	44.1 (1.74)	43.1 (1.70)	49.4 (1.94)	62.6 (2.46)	70.2 (2.76)	71.2 (2.80)	69.0 (2.72)	71.3 (2.81)	71.8 (2.83)	69.6 (2.74)	60.1 (2.37)	54.3 (2.14)	736.7 (29.01)
Average rainy days (≥ 0.2mm)	7.1	6.5	8.0	10.8	13.8	14.7	15.3	15.6	14.4	13.0	10.6	8.6	138.4
Source: Bureau of Meteorology

Average sea temperature (St Kilda)
Jan	Feb	Mar	Apr	May	Jun	Jul	Aug	Sep	Oct	Nov	Dec
21.1 °C (70.0 °F)	21.4 °C (70.5 °F)	20.2 °C (68.4 °F)	17.9 °C (64.2 °F)	15.1 °C (59.2 °F)	12.7 °C (54.9 °F)	11.1 °C (52.0 °F)	10.9 °C (51.6 °F)	12.3 °C (54.1 °F)	14.5 °C (58.1 °F)	17.1 °C (62.8 °F)	19.2 °C (66.6 °F)

Average Ultraviolet index
Month	January	February	March	April	May	June	July	August	September	October	November	December	Year
Average Ultraviolet index	11	10	7	4	2	1	1	3	5	7	9	11	5.8
Source: Bureau of Meteorology (UV index)

== See also ==
- Climate of Australia
- Geography of Melbourne
- Environment of Australia
- Extreme weather events in Melbourne
- Climate change in Australia
- Effects of global warming on Australia
- Effects of the El Niño–Southern Oscillation in Australia
