= 2005 Melbourne thunderstorm =

Severe weather event affecting parts of Victoria, Australia

The 2005 Melbourne thunderstorm was a severe weather event that occurred between 2 February and 3 February 2005, which produced 120 millimetres (4.7 in) of rain in Melbourne, the highest total since records began. Every suburb in Melbourne, as well as parts of eastern Victoria and the Geelong/Bellarine Peninsula, were affected by the storm.

== See also ==
- Extreme weather events in Melbourne
