= 2003 Melbourne thunderstorm =

2003 natural disaster

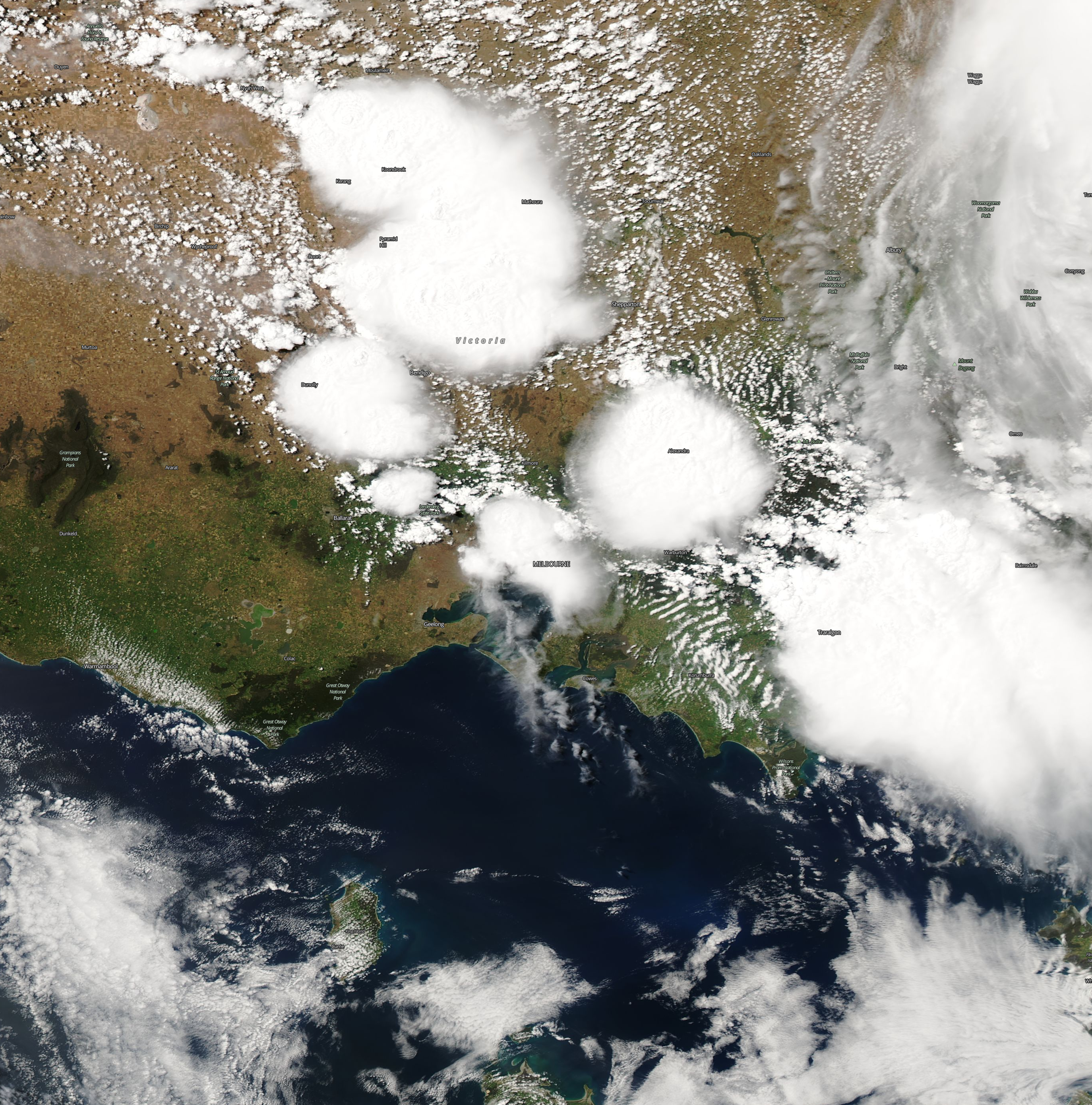
Image from NASA's Aqua satellite of heavy stormclouds over Melbourne on 3 December 2003

The Melbourne Thunder Storm of 2003 was a severe weather event that occurred over the city of Melbourne, Australia, and surrounding areas of Victoria, from 1 to 6 December 2003. Considered as Melbourne's worst storm since 1972, the Australian Bureau of Meteorology called the storm a "one-in-50-year to one-in-100-year event".

== Storm overview ==
Earlier storms had already occurred across Melbourne's east on 2 December 2003, with 10–12 millimetres (0.39–0.47 in) of rainfall pouring in the afternoon and evening. However, these storms were unrelated to the thunderstorms that formed on the night. According to the Bureau of Meteorology, the storm formed at around midnight over Craigieburn, then grew in size as it moved in a south-easterly direction towards the Melbourne CBD and Westernport Bay. The Bureau issued a severe thunderstorm warning based on their observations at 11.38 pm.

The two hours from midnight to 2 am saw extremely heavy rainfall, with some areas recording more than 100 mm of rain in that time. The rapid rainfall caused flash flooding, which resulted in extensive damage to property. The storms also brought large hail, with some accounts describing hailstones as large as golf balls. The storm hit during Emergency Communications Victoria's "routine upgrade" of computers at their two dispatch centres, which forced emergency workers to use alternative methods of rescue.

After reaching Westernport Bay at 5 am on 3 December 2003, the storm gradually blew itself out.

=== Rainfall ===
Viewbank recorded a rainfall of 107.8 millimetres (4.24 in), the highest from the storm. Other heavy rainfalls recorded were 107 millimetres (4.2 in) at Merri Creek, 106.6 millimetres (4.20 in) at the Eastern Golf Club, 104.6 millimetres (4.12 in) at Heidelberg, 87 millimetres (3.4 in) at Northcote, and 78.2 millimetres (3.08 in) at Lower Plenty.

== Impact ==
=== Affected areas ===
Areas that were affected included the suburbs of Preston, Ivanhoe, Coburg, Fairfield, Northcote, Blackburn, Fitzroy, and Glen Iris.

=== Melbourne's east ===
A number of motorists were trapped on the roofs of their cars as chest-high floodwater accumulated under the Bulleen Road Bridge on the Eastern Freeway. They were rescued by Melbourne's Metropolitan Fire Brigade using two maritime response unit boats. At McHale Stadium, floodwaters damaged documents and memorabilia from the Collingwood Football Club. Severe hailstorms caused thousands of dollars of damage to around 60 cars in the suburb of Lilydale. Hail also destroyed 40 other vehicles in a car park. Victoria Police arrested two people in connection with incidents of looting in Fairfield which had occurred during the height of the storms.

A taxi driver from Lower Templestowe was trapped in his car, with water up to his neck. A worker from the State Emergency Service (SES) freed the driver, bringing him to safety. Nursing homes in North Balwyn, Fairfield, and Preston were flooded. Damage to Marcellin College in Bulleen forced its closure for the rest of the year.

=== Aftermath ===
According to the Insurance Disaster Response Organisation, the storm caused "tens of millions of dollars" worth of damages. The Royal Automobile Club of Victoria received a "record number of calls for help" in the wake of the storm, with the SES receiving 1,400 calls for help. The then-Premier of Victoria, Steve Bracks, offered a grant of $900 to victims, with a personal hardship grant of up to $7,300.

== See also ==
- Extreme weather events in Melbourne
