= Mud map =

Australian term

Mud map is an Australian term for an informal map, intended to assist, but with no pretensions to accuracy or completeness. The term originates in such a map drawn in mud or dust with a stick, perhaps in response to a query by a stranger.

== Historical Context ==
In the early years of European settlement in Australia, much of the continent was unexplored and uncharted. To outline directions to each other, outback travelers would draw maps in the dirt or in the mud if it had rained. These maps, known as mud maps, were rough and ready, not very detailed, and lacked nuance.

== Modern Usage ==
While the literal practice of drawing maps in the mud has largely been replaced by printed maps and electronic copies, the term "mud map" has evolved in Australian English to refer to any rough guide, plan, or strategy. For example, one might say, "Do a mud map of what you must have, followed by what you'd like to have," indicating the creation of a simple plan or outline.

== Examples of usage ==
Now comes the keystone to understanding between black and white—the mud map.

Left: A New Zealand soldier provides a lesson on using mud maps during the TGT-7 mission rehearsal exercise.
