= Moosh =

Moosh can refer to

- Muş, a town in Turkey
- (موش) Mouse in Persian
- A character in The Legend of Zelda: Oracle of Ages and Seasons
- Australian slang for "mouth"
