= 1911–1916 Australian drought =

Natural disaster in Australia

The 1911–16 Australian drought consisted of a series of droughts that affected various regions of Australia between the years of 1911 and 1916. Most of the dry spells during this period can be related to three El Niño events in 1911, 1913 and 1914, though rainfall deficiencies actually began in northern Australia before the first of these El Niños set in and did not ease in coastal districts of New South Wales until well after the last El Niño had firmly dissipated and trends toward very heavy rainfall developed in other areas of the continent.

The years before the drought had generally had satisfactory rainfall with impressive crop yields throughout most of the continent with the exception of the Gippsland region, the coastal districts of New South Wales and southeastern Queensland. In these areas, the rainfall deficiencies of the Federation Drought had never disappeared at any point during the decade of the 1900s.

== 1911 ==
At the beginning of the year, a strong La Niña event was producing heavy rain over eastern Australia. January was the wettest on record in Sydney, and February was a phenomenally wet month in Victoria and southwestern New South Wales, with places like Pooncarie on the lower Darling River recording 190 millimetres (7.5 in) for the month. Averaged over Victoria, February 1911 stands as the third-wettest month since 1885 after October 1975 and February 1973. Heavy monsoonal rain drenched Queensland throughout the summer. These months, however, were virtually rainless in the southwestern quarter of the continent and quite dry in the Kimberley and Top End.

Early March saw exceptionally heavy rains in southern Victoria and eastern Tasmania: Melbourne's rainfall of 191 millimetres (7.5 in) remains a March record. However, in the Top End and Kimberley, drought was already established as Darwin had its driest March in 138 years of record with only 21 millimetres (0.83 in) as against an average of 290 millimetres (11 in). April saw some good late wet season rains in the north due to a severe tropical cyclone drenching Port Douglas with a daily fall of 801 millimetres (31.5 in) and promising rains in southwestern Australia.

However, despite the "big wet" continuing in southern Victoria through May and June, southwestern Australia and to lesser extent the settled parts of South Australia and southeast Queensland began to have major rainfall deficiencies in those months. By August dry conditions were, as is usual for El Niño years, general except in coastal districts of New South Wales and the southeast of Western Australia. Southwestern Australia was particularly hard-hit: wheat crops failed completely in many places and led to a revolution in water supply and farming techniques to cope with rainfalls lower than previously known. In the humid forest belt, 1911 was the driest year of the twentieth century at Margaret River and Cape Leeuwin and even the Warren River, the most nearly perennial river in all of WA, ceased to flow during the ensuing summer.

Apart from one big September fall in Victoria, dry and often hot conditions did not ease until one of the heaviest downpours ever known in Western Queensland fell in late November. This was followed by heavy general falls in December except in Queensland and northeastern New South Wales. November was the driest on record in many parts of western Victoria and eastern Queensland.

== 1912 ==
The hopes the good December rains gave soon disappeared as January was exceptionally dry almost throughout the continent except for a few normally-dry areas between Perth and Geraldton. Major tropical cyclones provided respite to the Kimberley in February and the Eucla in March, whilst a small coastal belt of the Wet Tropics had exceptionally heavy rainfall in April and May, with Innisfail recording 2,600 millimetres (100 in) for those two months.

However, elsewhere exceptionally dry conditions continued until a series of low pressure systems in June and July provided record-breaking rainfalls for that time of year in inland Queensland and New South Wales. Indeed, the winter averaged over those two states was nearly as wet as those of 1950 and 1998. The wheat areas of Western Australia, South Australia and Victoria missed the heavy June falls completely but were very wet in July and the Western District of Victoria was relieved of anxiety by exceptionally heavy rainfall in the first eighteen days of September. Despite a dry October outside of southeastern Queensland rainfall for the rest of the year was generally satisfactory throughout southern Australia, though the wet season did not start well in the north.

== 1913 ==
This year opened with some heavy monsoonal rains over the more coastal areas of Queensland and the Northern Territory in January; however, the month was very dry in the southeast apart from southern Tasmania. February was dry west of a line from Derby to Eucla and east from one between Melbourne and Bundaberg, but elsewhere some exceptionally heavy thunderstorm rains meant the month was a wet one. Adelaide received a particularly intense fall of 56.9 millimetres (2.24 in) on the 17th, with the worst flash flooding in the city's history. Apart from the North Coast of New South Wales, March was particularly wet, so much so that major flooding occurred in most rivers between Melbourne and Sydney. In Melbourne, the total of 23 rainy days is a record for any month between November and April and the low sunshine hours of only four per day also unparalleled.

The period around 12 April saw an extremely heavy if localised rainfall in the Albany district with totals of up to 175 millimetres (6.9 in) in a day near the Stirling Range and 114 millimetres (4.5 in) near Katanning. April was also very wet in the southern coastal districts of New South Wales, but May and June saw an unseasonal continuation of easterly winds. Thus, Tasmania, southwestern WA and the settled areas of South Australia were very dry, whilst most of New South Wales, Queensland and East Gippsland were wet. Apart from scattered coastal areas and the extreme southwest, July was exceptionally dry: Ouyen did not receive any rain in June or July and Adelaide's rainfall for the period of only 32 millimetres (1.3 in) was less than in the disastrous year of 1982. Frosts were exceptionally severe and led to fears of crop losses.

The following three months saw an abrupt reversal, with dry conditions in Queensland and most of New South Wales contrasting with good rains in the Mallee, South Australia and southwestern WA. August was particularly noteworthy as the most completely rainless month known in Queensland and New South Wales. The rain turned an unpromising wheat season into one of the best on record despite a violent cold outbreak in the east early in November when Melbourne recorded its lowest-ever maximum for that month on Melbourne Cup Day of just 11.4 °C (52.5 °F). December saw very wet conditions in Queensland, with record flows in some Cape York Peninsula streams; but, apart from one rain event mid-month with another record daily total in Adelaide, dry weather prevailed elsewhere.

== 1914 ==
January was very wet in the Top End, Kimberley and central Australia, but distinctly dry in the south of the continent, leading onto a major heatwave with exceptionally dry conditions in the far southeast during February, when Orbost received no rain and Hobart only 3 millimetres (0.12 in). Torrential rains around Eden and Bega in March and wet conditions in southeastern Australia (especially Tasmania) in April were followed by a second heavy fall in a belt from Broome to the Darling Downs in May. The area around Uluru saw some of the heaviest rainfalls known until the 1970s that month.

However, in the southern wheat belt May 1914 began a trend of powerful anticyclones and dry, easterly winds that was at the time quite unprecedented and not rivalled until 1982. In southwestern Australia the rainy season was extraordinarily poor from beginning to end, with only one significant fall all through from May to October and severe frosts prevalent throughout. June, August, September and October were all record dry months in Victoria and Tasmania, and even unusually heavy July rainfall in Gippsland could do nothing to alleviate the drought. The result was, that with the northerly areas around the Darling Downs not well developed yet, Australia's wheat crop was almost completely lost after an exceptionally hot October in which temperatures reached over 36 °C (97 °F) even in Hobart. Wheat yields in Victoria were only around 0.10 tonne per hectare and in WA even lower.

In coastal districts of New South Wales, however, the extraordinarily powerful anticyclones that desiccated the interior produced powerful onshore winds and extremely heavy rain: in Port Macquarie, the spring was the wettest on record. November and December were notably hot and humid, with rainfall near or above normal except in Tasmania and coastal Queensland during November. The southeast of Western Australia was particularly wet during these months, but in the desiccated agricultural regions the rain was much too late to save crops or pastures.

== 1915 ==
The heavy rainfall of November and December in Western Australia continued throughout the first two months of 1915, culminating in quite unseasonable downpours over the southwest at the end of February and beginning of March. During this period Perth had a spell of ten successive rainy days – more than it normally has in February and March combined. El Niño, however, remained powerful and eastern Australia was almost uniformly dry throughout the first three months of 1915 except for East Gippsland in January and Tasmania in March. Brisbane's March 1915 rainfall of 2.8 millimetres (0.11 in) is its lowest ever and only 2 percent of its long-term March mean, whilst even normally-soaked Cairns received only 120 millimetres (4.7 in). April was equally dry in Queensland and the Northern Territory and only Tasmania and an area near Onslow was even remotely above average across the whole continent.

In May, however, a trend of wet weather established itself across western Victoria, South Australia and southern Western Australia and continued right through to September. This wetness was backed up by the mildest winter across the southeast until global warming began in 1980. Crops that barely grew in 1914 grew with extraordinary vigour, and flooding even occurred in the Wimmera, around Adelaide and more severely in the Blackwood River of Western Australia. Although September saw unseasonable rain as far north as Mount Isa, the drought did not ease in Queensland, coastal New South Wales or Gippsland. Strong westerly winds and tinder-dry forests in August led to major bushfires breaking out in the North Coast of New South Wales and southeastern Queensland. Although occasional rain put many fires out in August and September, the dryness in these regions intensified greatly still in October and November due to extremely powerful westerly weather that saw New South Wales record its driest month of the twentieth century (statewide average rainfall 3.2 millimetres (0.13 in)). Despite patchy rain in December 1915 was still the driest calendar year on record in most of the North Coast of New South Wales and the Atherton Tableland of Queensland. Notable low falls include:

1. Herberton with 377.6 millimetres (14.87 in) against a median of 1,143 millimetres (45.0 in)
2. Lismore with 544 millimetres (21.4 in) against a median of 1,289 millimetres (50.7 in)
3. Port Macquarie with 730 millimetres (29 in) against a median of 1,410 millimetres (56 in)
4. Inverell with 423 millimetres (16.7 in) against a median of 749 millimetres (29.5 in)

The year was, however, very wet in almost all of Western Australia, and also in western Tasmania and an area around Darwin, where December saw an extremely active monsoon with flooding.

== 1916 ==
This year opened with heavy rain in Tasmania, southern Victoria and western Queensland, but the drought areas on the east coast did not gain relief until April. May, however was very dry except in a few coastal parts of New South Wales. This time, however, a powerful La Niña developed and produced starting in June exceptionally heavy rain across almost all inland areas of the continent. Adelaide set a record monthly rainfall of 218 millimetres (8.6 in) in June and there was major flooding of the whole city, whilst in July record rainfalls occurred throughout southwestern Queensland.

Still, it was not until nearly continent-wide heavy rains and flooding from late September to mid-December that the drought disappeared fully from the eastern coastal areas, especially Gippsland.

== See also ==
- Drought in Australia
