= Karl Lentzner =

Karl Lentzner (1842–1905) was a German-born linguist who published works pertaining to Australian English vocabulary in the late 19th century.

His Colonial English: A Glossary of Australian, Anglo-Indian, Pidgin English, West Indian, and South African Words (quickly withdrawn and reissued under less stringent copyright laws in Germany as Wörterbuch der Englischen Volkssprache Australiens, with text in English) was published by Kegan Paul, London & Ehrhardt Karras, Halle-Leipzig, in 1891. This is the first dictionary of colonial Australian, with slang, words introduced from Aboriginal languages and pidgin.

"Lentzner seems to have spent some years in New South Wales in the 1870s (he taught languages at Sydney Grammar and Kings School and mentions coming across "Yokohama-Pidgin" as spoken by Japanese naval officers in Sydney in 1877) which gives the Australian portions some claim to originality and importance; for the rest he relies heavily on other authorities." (Richard Neylon) The Colonial English word-lists are heavily dependent on earlier lists, with over half of the entries copied from Albert Barrère and Charles Godfrey Leland; Robertson concluding that Lentzner's book "is in fact a work of synthesis and plagiarism."

"The claim to originality and importance may be arguable and the use of other authorities questionable - as The Bulletin, in a scathing notice of 30 January 1892, wrote: "published at the end of last year ... [and] almost instantly withdrawn. The latter step was the proper one ... as the material, badly compiled at best, violated several copyrights." They went on: "The very faults of the work, however, will give it value in collectors' eyes, and those fortunate enough to get hold of one of the few copies which reached Australia may now be interested to know that the book is already selling at fancy prices." Whether, or however, the difficulties of copyright were resolved the same sheets were re-issued with a cancel title page and a new title, Dictionary of the Slang-English of Australia, dated 1892. Copies with either title seem equally hard to come by." (Neylon)

His other scholarly works include his 1886 doctoral dissertation at Leipzig (Uber das Sonett und seine Gestaltung in der englischen Dichtung bis Milton), Tesoro de voces y provincialismos hispano-americanos (ed., 1892), Chamisso: a Sketch of His Life and Work (London, 1893), A Short Scandinavian Grammar (Oxford, 1895), The Teaching of Literature as Literature : Illustrated by the Treatment of German Classics in German Schools (Aberystwyth, 1897), and a pamphlet on the Shakespeare-Bacon controversy (Zur Shakespeare-Bacon Theorie, 1890).
