= Send 'er down, Huey! =

Australian idiomatic phrase

Send 'er down, Huey!, sometimes Send her down, Huey! or Send it down, Huey!, is an idiomatic Australian phrase uttered in response to the onset of rain. It was in very common usage in the early 20th century, but is less common now.

Interpreted literally, the phrase is a request that God, or a rain god, send plenty of rainfall. It thus embodies the typical response to rain in most Outback areas of Australia, which are prone to drought; and the common Australian practice of referring to people by nicknames, often with obscure meaning.

It is also testament to the social egalitarianism prevalent in Australia, in which even God may be treated with familiarity. With regard to this last point, Russel Ward has referred to the phrase as "egalitarian and familiar, yet not essentially sacrilegious ".

Various referents for "Huey" have been proposed, including

- Saint Hugh of Lincoln, a saint long traditionally associated with rain, as attested in Thomas Dekker's 1600 play The Shoemaker's Holiday:
  "Cold's the weather, and wet's the rain,
  Saint Hugh be our good speed,
  Ill is the weather that bringeth no gain,
  Nor helps good hearts in need."
- the Bell Huey helicopter, models of which were used as gunships during the Vietnam War (Clearly anachronistic, as the writings of authors such as Frank Dalby Davison use the phrase three decades before the first Bell HU helicopter.)
- Various Australian people such as government meteorologist Hugh Watt, Victorian irrigation pioneer Hugh McColl and Australian cricketing off spin bowler Hugh Trumble
- corruptions of the names of various Gods such as Jupiter ("Juie"), Zeus ("Zuie") and Yahweh
- a corruption of Yowie, an Indigenous Australian language word for thunder

None of these suggestions are regarded as particularly convincing.

The phrase has been used as the name of a Slim Dusty song from the album Walk a Country Mile, and is the title of a 1968 book by Arthur F. Clifford. Singer John Williamson has used the term as well. It forms the title of a song about the breaking of a drought in the musical Summer Rain (set in 1945 in outback New South Wales), with the phrase featured in the song's lyric.

In 2002, Send it down Huey was used for a series of drought relief concerts and music releases, including a CD that sold over 4000 copies.

The term is used in context on page 154 of The Anzac Legend – a Graphic History as rain began to fall on the troops lying on the hills above Anzac Cove, 25 April 1915.

== See also ==
- Climate of Australia
- Drought in Australia
- Culture of Australia
