= Federation Drought =

1895–1902 period of low rainfall in Australia

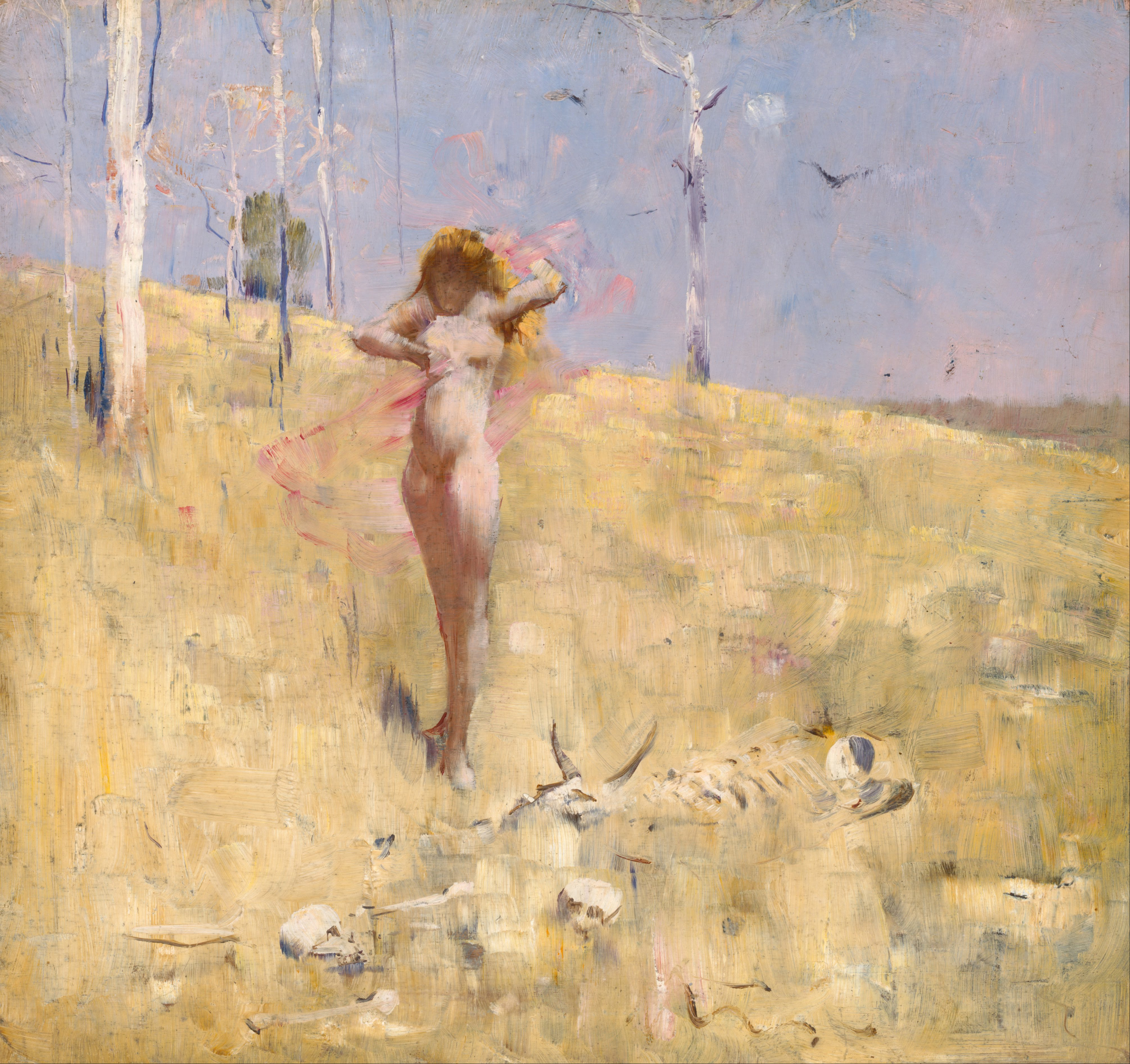
The Spirit of the Drought by Australian impressionist artist Arthur Streeton, 1895, National Gallery of Australia

The Federation Drought was a prolonged period of drought that occurred in Australia around the time of Federation in 1901.

Though often thought of as a long drought, until the record dry year of 1902 the period was actually one of a number of very dry spells interspersed with wetter weather. Dry conditions gradually became established during the late 1890s and several dry areas joined together to create the end result of a drought covering more than half the continent.

== Beginnings ==
Except for a widespread El Nino drought in 1888, the late 1880s and early 1890s were a period of extremely heavy rainfall over New South Wales, Queensland and to a lesser extent Victoria and the settled areas of Tasmania and South Australia. Lake Eyre is believed to have filled with water from Cooper Creek in 1886/1887, 1889/1890 and 1894.

The wet spell of the early 1890s ended earliest in the area between Melbourne and Sydney, where rainfall in 1894 was below normal even as much of inland Queensland and New South Wales had one of their wettest years on record. A very hot November with temperatures reaching 40 °C (104 °F) made the situation critical in some areas. Though Sydney had heavy rainfall in January and February 1895, from March that year drought began spreading widely across New South Wales and Victoria. The winter that year was the driest on record in Sydney, and despite a relieving fall during September, Sydney's rainfall for the period March to December was the third-lowest on record. The winter was dominated by very strong westerly winds to quite low latitudes and was very wet in southwestern Australia and wet in the Adelaide region and Western District of Victoria, but only about average in the drier areas further inland. Over all of Victoria and South Australia, however, extremely dry weather in October and November was sufficient to cause the failure of many wheat crops, whilst in East Gippsland these months saw unprecedented rainless spells.

== 1895 ==
These years began with a hot spell and numerous bushfires especially in Gippsland, which had suffered two years of deficient rainfall. Despite a very powerful monsoon in the north, heavy rains therefrom during February only broke the drought temporarily, as El Niño developed later that year. Despite El Niño, drought-stricken Gippsland has one of its wettest winters on record as a series of storms produced torrential rains between Melbourne and Sydney—and around Hobart—in June and again in August. Early in September, huge floods occurred on East Gippsland streams as Orbost received 179.9 millimetres (7.08 in) in three days, but inland Victoria and New South Wales had been dry ever since May and the rest of September and October were almost completely dry, leading to another wheat crop failure.

November was very wet in northern New South Wales, but still dry further south, whilst in the settled areas of South Australia dry conditions had been much worse, with no above-average rainfall since April.

== 1897 ==
This year began with cool, moist summer weather in most of Victoria and New South Wales, but conditions in Queensland, which had continued to have heavy rain during the "wet" season in 1895 and 1896 became drier. In inland districts the first transition to drought began as February and March were distinctly dry.

April was particularly dry despite the breakdown of El Niño, as was May except in Gippsland, but June and July were very wet over inland New South Wales and northern Victoria (it was the wettest winter on record at some stations such as Nyngan and Echuca). August saw good rains shift to South Australia and coastal Victoria, but despite continued good rains in September and October over inland New South Wales water supplies did not really recover owing to a very dry November and a hot December in inland regions, which saw temperatures again reach 40 °C (104 °F) in many parts of Victoria and not much less in Tasmania, where rainfall had again been deficient throughout the winter. Heavy rains on the North Coast of New South Wales were of little use to an agricultural sector that was seeing many inland properties demonstrably overstocked based on expectations of higher rainfall than was falling.

== 1898 ==
The heatwave conditions during December 1897 continued early this year as Melbourne set a still-standing record mean maximum for February of 30.2 °C (86.4 °F). The northeast of New South Wales was deluged by moist easterly winds and a low-pressure system that moved over inland Victoria with valuable rain later gave the South Coast some of the heaviest rainfall ever known in Australia: Bega had 687.2 millimetres (27.06 in) in five days, or more rainfall than it has received in two-fifths of all complete years.

However, despite continued heavy rain and flooding in Queensland and the North Coast of New South Wales in March, extremely dry conditions were established over all the rest of southeastern Australia and good rains in South Australia during April and May had little effect inland despite producing heavy rain in Gippsland - which had been rainless since the beginning of the year apart from its February deluge.

Although a weak La Niña began developing and June was very wet over most of South Australia and inland Victoria, it was still dry in Tasmania and southern Victoria, and July was dry generally except in Tasmania and the southeast of South Australia. August, though wet in southwestern Australia and the west of New South Wales, was extremely dry in the worst-hit areas of southern Victoria, whilst useful September rains did little to ameliorate the situation there. November was very dry except in Tasmania and South Gippsland, and December even worse except in areas of the Mallee affected by thunderstorms.

Despite 1898 being wet over most of Queensland, it was very dry in the northwestern slopes of New South Wales and much of southern Victoria. in Melbourne, 1898 was the driest year until 1967, and in Orbost it is still the third-driest year on record.

== 1899 ==
This year saw southern Victoria and Tasmania have heavy rains in January, as did Queensland, whilst February and March - though dry in New South Wales - again saw good rains there as cold fronts linked with tropical moisture. March and April saw heavy rains in southern Victoria continue, but these months were still dry in inland New South Wales and Queensland.

With El Niño returning, however, May was very dry in most inland districts, but June was—welcomingly as it turned out—extremely wet in Victoria and northeastern South Australia. July, however, saw some of the coldest conditions on record in the grain country: in Melbourne, the mean minimum temperature of 3.8 °C (38.8 °F) is the lowest on record and in many places sub-zero minima were general on most days during July and August. Adelaide had its driest July on record with a total of only 10 millimetres (0.39 in).

The anticyclonic conditions, however, created a strong onshore flow that gave the cost of New South Wales almost continuous heavy rain: in Sydney the winter of 1899 was the second-wettest on record. Major flooding occurred on most coastal rivers.

Dry conditions continued throughout the rest of the year except on the coast of New South Wales, and only the heavy June falls prevented grain crops being a total failure. By the end of 1899, El Niño was already producing a very poor northern monsoon, and apart from the southeast December was unusually dry throughout Queensland, and also the Top End and Kimberley.

== 1900 ==
The early part of this year saw one of the most complete monsoon failures in the north of Australia, especially in normally wet Cape York Peninsula where the year proved the driest on record at many stations. In February, a major heatwave and dust storms hit southeastern Australia.

Although the monsoon did not return in the north, March saw the beginning of a very wet period in Victoria, South Australia, and most of Western Australia as northwest cloudbands generated repeated heavy rain. With the associated troughs developing into low pressure systems in the Tasman Sea, Melbourne and most of South Gippsland had their wettest autumn on record. On 17 May, the Yarra River was flooded and a few days later the torrential rain extended to Sydney and the south coast of New South Wales, which saw further heavy rain in June and July - in the latter case after most unseasonable rain had hit tropical northwestern Australia. In the process snow fell to low levels in New South Wales.

Tasmania and Queensland remained very dry as a result of missing the heavy autumn falls, and after some heavy rain in August over the settled areas of South Australia and southwestern Western Australia, dry conditions returned to the continent in a fashion more decisive than at any earlier stage of the drought. Almost the whole continent apart from the southeast of Western Australia was below average for the September to December period, with October being the third-driest on record in Brisbane. A promising season for the wheat and pastoral industries thus became mediocre at best.

== 1901 ==
The monsoon in Queensland was again very poor apart from the Wet Tropics and Cape York, and in February an extremely active and vigorous monsoon low over inland South Australia brought further east not rain but a disastrous heatwave with Melbourne reporting its hottest February temperature (43.1 °C (109.6 °F)) until 1983.

March was wet over northwestern Queensland, the Moreton region, South Gippsland and Tasmania, but the rains did not extend into the dry reaches of the continent. Then, despite a torrential downpour (138 millimetres (5.4 in) in three days at Melbourne) producing another big Yarra flood in April, May to July was generally dry apart from June in southern coastal areas and the settled parts of South Australia, besides which June was also very cold. During July, a huge cold outbreak produced record low maximum temperatures at many places. Snow astonishingly fell as far north as Winton and at Daylesford the temperature on 26 July never rose above −2 °C (28 °F).

A record wet August over New South Wales and adjacent areas of Queensland and Victoria proved no more than a temporary respite. Very dry conditions set in during September over New South Wales, again affecting crop yields severely, and despite the first half of spring being distinctly wet over Victoria and Tasmania and these rains extending as far north as the Eyre Peninsula and Condobolin, November and December were exceedingly dry - sixth-driest and second-driest averaged over Australia since 1900.

== 1902 ==
Although dry conditions had been a feature over significant parts of the continent since 1894, it was only this year that large-scale drought began to become genuinely disastrous.

January and February were wet over Tasmania, but distinctly dry further north, and despite a heavy storm over southern Victoria and the settled areas of South Australia, March continued the trend of complete summer rainfall failure in New South Wales and Queensland. Most areas of those two states had their lowest rainfall for the November to March period on record, and April was even worse—being averaged over Australia, the driest month of the twentieth century, with a rainfall of only 3 millimetres (0.12 in). Sheep and cattle over the inland pastoral districts were already starving, and so extensive was the drought that agistment was not available in any place to which transport could be arranged. The result was that sheep died in numbers that have never been equalled before or since: some sources estimate that half the sheep population was lost in the drought.

Although in southwestern Australia—often looked upon as a "saviour" when the rains fail further east—the rainy season began on time in May, the dry weather continued without a break in the eastern states. Then, despite June being quite wet in southern Victoria, Tasmania and even parts of South Australia, the month's rain was associated with Antarctic air outbreaks that produced extremely severe frosts and several cases of low-level snowfalls. Oatlands recorded a temperature as low as −12 °C (10 °F) during one of these outbreaks, and snow fell in Hobart. Worse still, northern New South Wales and southern Queensland remained as dry as ever, and southwestern Australia was very dry.

Despite torrential rains in July around Eden and heavy rains in the far southwest of Western Australia, rainless or near-rainless conditions continued elsewhere with extremely severe frosts. August was the driest-ever winter month in Perth with only 12 millimetres (0.47 in), and Melbourne, equally dry, set a record for lowest mean August minimum temperature at 4.5 °C (40.1 °F) broken only in 1943 and 1944.

Though September was wet over southern Western Australia and a single heavy storm produced above-average rainfall in eastern Tasmania and southern Victoria, and October saw very heavy coastal rains in New South Wales (Sydney's 162 millimetres (6.38 in) on the 13th is still its wettest-ever October day), unrelenting dryness inland combined with hot northerly winds saw one of the worst dust storms ever hit Melbourne on 12 November. Any hope for the wheat crop had gone as early as the end of August, and yields were close to the worst ever.

Although November 1902 later proved a very wet month in a band of country between about Southern Cross and Jundah, it was still very dry in more coastal areas.

== Aftermath ==
December 1902 proved the first month since 1898 when most of the continent had heavy rain. Indeed, in southwestern Victoria many stations had their highest daily rainfall on record, resulting in flash flooding. Only the Kimberley, the North Coast of New South Wales and Western Tasmania remained below average.

The remainder of the 1902/1903 summer was disappointing and the monsoon generally weak (though parts of Queensland had heavy falls from cyclones) but from March onwards 1903 proved a generally wet year apart from coastal areas of New South Wales and East Gippsland. Cereal crops, which had constantly failed due to frost and lack of spring rainfall, were exceptionally good due to a wet September throughout southern Australia apart from Tasmania and the Western District. It was in these critical spring months where the rainfall deficiencies of the Federation Drought were concentrated, and the return of the spring rains was followed by a strong monsoon over tropical Australia: at Cooktown and Kojonup 1903 is the wettest calendar year on record.

Overall for eastern states 1903 came out as the wettest year since 1894, even if its rainfalls were distinctly short of the high marks of the early 1890s except over western Victoria and parts of South Australia.

In East Gippsland and coastal regions of New South Wales the entire decade between 1901 and 1910 was consistently dry: Sydney did not exceed its long-term mean rainfall once, and Brisbane did so only twice between 1899 and 1915.

Other parts of eastern Australia, even with a significant improvement over falls between 1895 and 1902, rarely saw rainfall during the 1900s and 1910s nearly so heavy as during the early 1890s. Climatologists today frequently view the Federation Drought as a major climate shift across eastern Australia from the wet period of the nineteenth century to a dry spell lasting until the mid-1940s. This is supported by many hydrological records, such as that of Lake George near Canberra and many coastal rivers in South Wales.

== See also ==
- Drought in Australia
- Dust storm
