= Australian English vocabulary =

Major variety of the English language spoken throughout Australia

Australian English is a major variety of the English language spoken throughout Australia. Most of the vocabulary of Australian English is shared with British English, though there are notable differences. The vocabulary of Australia is drawn from many sources, including various dialects of British English as well as Gaelic languages, some Indigenous Australian languages, and Polynesian languages.

One of the first dictionaries of Australian slang was Karl Lentzner's Dictionary of the Slang-English of Australia and of Some Mixed Languages in 1892. The first dictionary based on historical principles that covered Australian English was E. E. Morris's Austral English: A Dictionary of Australasian Words, Phrases and Usages (1898). In 1981, the more comprehensive Macquarie Dictionary of Australian English was published. Oxford University Press published the Australian Oxford Dictionary in 1999, in concert with the Australian National University. Oxford University Press also published The Australian National Dictionary.

Broad and colourful Australian English has been popularised over the years by 'larrikin' characters created by Australian performers such as Chips Rafferty, John Meillon, Paul Hogan, Barry Humphries, Greig Pickhaver and John Doyle, Michael Caton, Steve Irwin, Jane Turner and Gina Riley. It has been claimed that, in recent times, the popularity of the Barry McKenzie character, played on screen by Barry Crocker, and in particular of the soap opera Neighbours, led to a "huge shift in the attitude towards Australian English in the UK", with such phrases as "chunder", "liquid laugh" and "technicolour yawn" all becoming well known as a result.

== Words of Australian origin ==
The origins of some of the words are disputed.

- Battler – a person with few natural advantages, who works doggedly and with little reward, who struggles for a livelihood and who displays courage. The first citation for this comes from Henry Lawson in While the Billy Boils (1896): "I sat on him pretty hard for his pretensions, and paid him out for all the patronage he'd worked off on me... and told him never to pretend to me again he was a battler".
- Bludger – a person who avoids working, or doing their share of work, a loafer, scrounger, a hanger-on, one who does not pull his weight; originally, a pimp.
- Bogan – an Australian term for describing someone who may be a yobbo (redneck). The major difference between the two is that yobbo tends to be used as a noun, whereas bogan can also be used adjectivally to describe objects pertaining to people who are bogans. Regional variations include "Bevan" in and around Brisbane, and "Booner" around Canberra. It is usually an uncultured person with vulgar behavior, speech, clothing, etc.
- Cooker – a derogatory term for conspiracy theorist; according to the National Dictionary Centre, "a derogatory term for a person involved in protests against vaccine mandates, government lockdowns and a range of other issues perceived to be infringing on personal freedom". Emerging during the COVID-19 pandemic in Australia, the word made the shortlist for "Word of the Year" in 2022. The term is also loosely associated with the far right.
- Didgeridoo – a wind instrument that was originally found only in Arnhem Land in northern Australia. It is a long, wooden, tubular instrument that produces a low-pitched, resonant sound with complex, rhythmic patterns but little tonal variation.
- Digger – an Australian soldier. The term was applied during the First World War to Australian and New Zealand soldiers because so much of their time was spent digging trenches. An earlier Australian sense of digger was "a miner digging for gold". Billy Hughes, prime minister during the First World War, was known as the Little Digger. First recorded in this sense 1916.
- Dinkum or fair dinkum – "true", "the truth", "speaking the truth", "authentic" and related meanings, depending on context and inflection. The Evening News (Sydney, NSW) 23 August 1879 has one of the earliest references to fair dinkum. It originated with a now-extinct dialect word from the East Midlands in England, where dinkum (or dincum) meant "hard work" or "fair work", which was also the original meaning in Australian English.
- Dunny – a privy, toilet or lavatory (from British dunnekin). To many Australians "bathroom" is a room with a bath or shower.
- Fair go – a reasonable chance, a fair deal. Australia often sees itself as an egalitarian society, the land of the fair go, where all citizens have a right to fair treatment.
- Grogan – Any form of poo and also a common surname
- Jackaroo – a type of agricultural worker.
- Nasho (plural nashos) – a person undergoing National Service, mandatory military service in Australia. The word is often used for Vietnam War soldiers when conscription became controversial. Since that time, conscription has not been implemented in Australia.
- Nork – a female breast (usually in plural); etymology disputed, but has been linked to Norco, a NSW milk company.
- Outback – a "remote, sparsely-populated area".

=== Words of Australian Aboriginal origin ===
Some elements of Aboriginal languages have been incorporated into Australian English, mainly as names for flora and fauna (for example koala, dingo, kangaroo).

Some examples are cooee and yakka. The former is a high-pitched call (/ˈkuːiː/) which travels long distances and is used to attract attention, which has been derived from Dharug, an Aboriginal language spoken in the Sydney region. Cooee has also become a notional distance: if he's within cooee, we'll spot him. Yakka means work, strenuous labour, and comes from 'yaga' meaning 'work' in the Yagara indigenous language of the Brisbane region. Yakka found its way into nineteenth-century Australian pidgin, and then passed into Australian English. First recorded 1847.

Boomerang is an Australian word which has moved into International English. It was also borrowed from Dharug.

== Words of British, Irish or American origin ==
Many such words, phrases or usages originated with British and Irish settlers to Australia from the 1780s until the present. For example: a creek in Australia (as in North America), is any "stream or small river", whereas in England it is a small watercourse flowing into the sea; paddock is the Australian word for "field", while in England it is a small enclosure for livestock. Bush (as in North America) or scrub means "wooded areas" or "country areas in general" in Australia, while in England they are commonly used only in proper names (such as Shepherd's Bush and Wormwood Scrubs). Australian English and several British English dialects (e.g., Cockney, Scouse, Geordie) use the word mate to mean a friend, rather than the conventional meaning of "a spouse", although this usage has also become common in some other varieties of English.

- Billy – a tin or enamel cooking pot with a lid and wire handle, used outdoors, especially for making tea. It comes from the Scottish dialect word billy meaning "cooking utensil".
- Fair dinkum – reliable; genuine; honest; true, comes from British dialect. The phrase is recorded in a north Lincolnshire dialect for the first time meaning "fair play" or "fair dealing", although "dinkum" on its own had been used in Derbyshire and Lincolnshire, meaning "work" or "punishment". "Fair dinkum" was first used in England in 1881, and is the equivalent of West Yorkshire "fair doos". The word "dinkum" is first recorded in Australia in the 1890s.
- G'day – a greeting, meaning "good day".
- Manchester (frequently lower-case) – household linen (sheets, pillow cases etc.), as in "manchester department" of a department store. From "Manchester wares" with exactly the same meaning.
- Ripper – excellent, perhaps from English "ripping", also as noun for something excellent of its type. Common in the expression "You little ripper!" – an exclamation of transcendent joy.
- Sheila – slang for "woman", derived from the feminine Irish given name Síle (pronounced [ˈʃiːlʲə]), commonly anglicised Sheila).
- Yobbo – an Australian variation on the UK slang yob, meaning someone who is loud, rude and obnoxious, behaves badly, anti-social, and frequently drunk (and prefixed by "drunken").

== Rhyming slang ==
Rhyming slang is more common in older generations though modern examples exist amongst some social groupings. It is similar, and in some cases identical, to Cockney rhyming slang, for example plates (of meat) for "feet" and china (plate) for "mate". Some specifically Australian examples are dead horse for "sauce", Jack Holt for "salt" (one famous Jack Holt was a horse trainer, another a boxing promoter), Barry Crocker for "shocker" (Crocker is a well-known entertainer), as well as do a Harold Holt meaning "to do a bolt" (Harold Holt being a former Prime Minister who disappeared whilst swimming at sea, giving a double meaning to the term). Chunder for "vomit" most likely comes from Chunder Loo = "spew" ("Chunder Loo of Akim Foo" was a Norman Lindsay character; "spew" is synonym for "vomit"). See.

== Diminutives and abbreviations ==
Australian English vocabulary draws heavily on diminutives and abbreviations. These may be confusing to foreign speakers when they are used in everyday conversations.

There are over 5,000 identified diminutives in use. While other English dialects use diminutives in a similar way, none are so prolific or diverse. A large number of these are widely recognised and used by Australian English speakers. However, many are used only by specific demographic groups or in localised areas. Researchers are now beginning to study what psychological motivations cause Australians to abbreviate so many words.

== Colloquial phrases ==
Numerous idiomatic phrases occur in Australian usage, some more historical than contemporary in usage.

Send her down, Hughie is an example of surfie slang. Australian Football League spectators use the term "white maggot" (derived from their formerly white uniforms) towards umpires at games.

== Alcohol ==
Amber is generic term for any beer (lager/stout/ale) in general, but especially cold and on-tap.

Not only has there been a wide variety of measures in which beer is served in pubs in Australia, the names of these glasses differ from one area to another. However, the range of glasses has declined greatly in recent years.

Names of beer glasses in various Australian cities (Note: Entries in bold are common.) (Note: Entries in italics are old-fashioned or rare.) (Note: Entries marked with a dash are not applicable.)
Capacity (Note: The "fl oz" referred to here is the imperial fluid ounce.)	Sydney	Canberra	Darwin	Brisbane	Adelaide	Hobart	Melbourne	Perth
115 ml (4 fl oz)	–	–	–	–	-	small beer	foursie	shetland
140 ml (5 fl oz)	pony	–	–	pony	pony	–	horse/pony	pony
170 ml (6 fl oz)	–	–	–	–	butcher (Note: Before metrification, the butcher was 6 fl oz.)	six (ounce)	–	bobbie/six
200 ml (7 fl oz)	seven	–	**seven**	**beer**	**butcher**	seven (ounce)	**glass**	glass
285 ml (10 fl oz)	**middy**	**middy** / half pint	**handle**	**pot** (Note: "Pot" is also known as Pot glass)	**schooner** (Note: Confusingly for visitors, South Australians use the same names for different volumes than in the other States.)	**ten (ounce)**	**pot**	**middy** / half pint
350 ml (12 fl oz)	schmiddy (Note: A modern glass size, mainly used with European beers. While the glass may be 350ml, a 330ml or 300ml fill line is common. With the increasing popularity of European beers, glasses of size 250ml and 500ml are also becoming more prevalent, but as yet don't seem to have acquired "names".)	–	–	–	–	–	–	–
425 ml (15 fl oz)	**schooner**	**schooner**	**schooner**	**schooner**	**pint**	fifteen / **schooner**	**schooner**	schooner (Note: Traditionally, 425 ml is a size rarely found in Western Australia.)
570 ml (20 fl oz)	**pint**	**pint**	pint	**pint**	**imperial pint**	**pint**	**pint**	**pint**
Notes:							References: 1. The Aussie Beer Baron; 2. Buying Beer in Australia; 3. Guidelines at a glance 4. Ordering Beer; 5. Liquor Merchants Association of Australia (via archive.org); 6. Which Size Beer Do Ya Want, Mate? (via archive.org); 7. Take a butcher's hook at the butcher glass	

== Pre-decimal currency ==
Before decimalisation, Australian monetary units closely reflected British usage: four farthings (obsolete by 1945) or two halfpence to a penny; 12 pence to a shilling; 20 shillings to a pound, but terms for the coinage were uniquely Australian, particularly among working-class adult males: "Brown": a penny (1d.); "Tray": threepence (3d.); "Zac": sixpence (6d.); "Bob" or "Deener": a shilling (1s.); "Two bob bit": a florin (2s.) ("Bob" and "Two bob bit" are also British usage.)

Slang terms for notes mostly followed British usage: "Ten bob note": ten shillings (10s.); "Quid" (or "fiddly did"): pound note (£1); "Fiver": five pound note (£5); "Tenner" or "Brick": ten pound note (£10). Other terms have been recorded but rarely used outside the racetrack. One confusing matter is that five shillings prior to decimal currency was called a "Dollar", in reference to the Spanish Dollar and "Holey Dollar" which circulated at a value of five shillings, but the Australian Dollar at the introduction of decimal currency was fixed at 10 shillings.

== Sport ==
=== Football ===
Australia has four major codes of football; Australian rules football, rugby league, rugby union, and association football. Generally, rugby league is called football in New South Wales and Queensland, while rugby union is called either rugby or union throughout. Both rugby league and rugby union are often collectively referred to as rugby in other states where Australian rules football is called football. Australian rules football is also commonly referred to as "Aussie Rules" and "footy" outside the context of the Australian Football League. Association football is known as "soccer" in Australia, and is only called "football'" when mentioned in conjunction with a specific league, such as the A-League or Premier League, otherwise "football" on its own means either Australian football or rugby on its own depending on the region of Australia.

=== Horse racing ===
"Bookie" is a common term for an on-course bookmaker, but "metallician" was once a (semi-humorous or mock-intellectual) common synonym.

== Comparison with other varieties ==
Where British and American vocabulary differs, Australians sometimes favour a usage different from both varieties, as with footpath (for US sidewalk, UK pavement), capsicum (for US bell pepper, UK green/red pepper), or doona (for US comforter, UK duvet) from a trademarked brand. In other instances, it either shares a term with American English, as with truck (UK: lorry) or eggplant (UK: aubergine), or with British English, as with mobile phone (US: cell phone) or bonnet (US: hood).

Terms shared by British and American English but not so commonly found in Australian English include (Australian usage in bold): abroad (overseas); cooler/ice box (Esky); flip-flops (thongs); pickup truck (ute); wildfire (bushfire).

Australian English is particularly divergent from other varieties with respect to geographical terminology, due to the country's unique geography. This is particularly true when comparing with British English, due to that country's dramatically different geography. British geographical terms not in common use in Australia include (Australian usage in bold): coppice (cleared bushland); dell (valley); fen (swamp); heath (shrubland); meadow (grassy plain); moor (swampland); spinney (shrubland); stream (creek); woods (bush) and village (even the smallest settlements in Australia are called towns or stations).

In addition, a number of words in Australian English have different meanings from those ascribed in other varieties of English. Clothing-related examples are notable. Pants in Australian English follows American usage in reference to British English trousers but in British English refer to Australian English underpants; vest in Australian English pass also in American refers to British English waistcoat but in British English refers to Australian English singlet. Thong in both American and British English refers to underwear (known in Australia as a G-string), while in Australian English it refers to British and American English flip-flop (footwear). There are numerous other examples, including biscuit which refers in Australian and British English to what in American English is cookie or cracker but to a savoury cake in American English (though cookie is often used for American-styled biscuits such as chocolate chip cookies); Asian, which in Australian and American English commonly refers to people of East Asian heritage, as opposed to British English, in which it commonly refers to people of South Asian descent; (potato) chips which refers both to British English crisps (which is not used in Australian English) and to American English French fries (which is used alongside hot chips); and football, which in Australian English refers to Australian rules football, Rugby league or Rugby union – what British refer to as football is referred to as soccer and what Americans term football is referred to as gridiron.

In addition to the large number of uniquely Australian idioms in common use, there are instances of idioms taking differing forms in the various Anglophone nations, for example (Australian usage in bold): Home away from home, take with a grain of salt and wouldn't touch with a ten-foot pole (which in British English take the respective forms home from home, take with a pinch of salt and wouldn't touch with a barge pole), or a drop in the ocean and touch wood (which in American English take the forms a drop in the bucket and knock on wood).

=== British and American English terms not widely used in Australian English ===
There are extensive terms used in other varieties of English which are not widely used in Australian English. These terms usually do not result in Australian English speakers failing to comprehend speakers of other varieties of English, as Australian English speakers will often be familiar with such terms through exposure to media or may ascertain the meaning using context.

Non-exhaustive selections of British English and American English terms not commonly used in Australian English together with their definitions or Australian English equivalents are found in the collapsible table below:

British English terms not widely used in Australian English

- **Allotment** (gardening): A community garden not connected to a dwelling
- **Artic** or **articulated lorry** (vehicle): Australian English semi-trailer)
- **Aubergine** (vegetable): Australian English eggplant
- Bank holiday: Australian English public holiday
- Barmy: Crazy, mad or insane.
- Bedsit: Australian English studio (apartment)
- Belisha beacon: A flashing light atop a pole used to mark a pedestrian crossing
- Bin lorry: Australian English: garbage truck/rubbish truck
- Bobby: A police officer, particularly one of lower rank
- Cagoule: A lightweight raincoat or windsheeter
- **Candy floss** (confectionery): Australian English fairy floss
- Cash machine: Australian English automatic teller machine
- Chav: Lower socio-economic person comparable to Australian English bogan
- Child-minder: Australian English babysitter
- Chivvy: To hurry (somebody) along. Australian English nag
- Chrimbo: Abbreviation for Christmas comparable to Australian English Chrissy
- Chuffed: To be proud (especially of oneself)
- **Cleg** (insect): Australian English horsefly
- Clingfilm: A plastic wrap used in food preparation. Australian English Glad wrap/cling wrap
- Community payback: Australian English community service
- Comprehensive school: Australian English state school or public school
- Cooker: A kitchen appliance. Australian English stove and/or oven
- Coppice: An area of cleared woodland
- Council housing: Australian English public housing
- Counterpane: A bed covering. Australian English bedspread
- Courgette: A vegetable. Australian English zucchini
- Creche: Australian English child care centre
- (potato) Crisps: Australian English (potato) chips
- Current account: Australian English transaction account
- Dell: A small secluded hollow or valley
- Do: Australian English party or social gathering
- Doddle: An easy task
- **Doss** (verb): To spend time idly
- Drawing pin: Australian English thumb tack
- Dungarees: Australian English overalls
- Dustbin: Australian English garbage bin/rubbish bin
- Dustcart: Australian English garbage truck/rubbish truck
- Duvet: Australian English doona
- **Elastoplast** or plaster: An adhesive used to cover small wounds. Australian English band-aid
- Electrical lead: Australian English electrical cord
- Estate car: Australian English station wagon
- Fairy cake: Australian English cupcake
- Father Christmas: Australian English Santa Claus
- Fen: A low and frequently flooded area of land, similar to Australian English swamp
- Free phone: Australian English toll-free
- Gammon: Meat from the hind leg of pork. Australian English makes no distinction between gammon and ham
- Git: A foolish person. Equivalent to idiot or moron
- Goose pimples: Australian English goose bumps
- Hacked off: To be irritated or upset, often with a person
- Hairgrip: Australian English hairpin or bobbypin
- Half-term: Australian English school holiday
- Haulier: Australian English hauler
- Heath: An area of dry grass or shrubs, similar to Australian English shrubland
- **Hoover**(verb): Australian English to vacuum
- Horsebox: Australian English horse float
- Ice lolly: Australian English ice block or icy pole
- Juicy bits: Small pieces of fruit residue found in fruit juice. Australian English pulp
- Kip: To sleep
- Kitchen roll: Australian English paper towel
- Landslip: Australian English landslide
- Lavatory: Australian English toilet (lavatory is used in Australian English for toilets on aeroplanes)
- Lido: A public swimming pool
- Lorry: Australian English truck
- Loudhailer: Australian English megaphone
- **Mackintosh** or mac: Australian English raincoat
- Mangetout: Australian English snow pea
- Marrow: Australian English squash
- Minidish: A satellite dish for domestic (especially television) use
- Moggie: A domestic short-haired cat
- Moor: A low area prone to flooding, similar to Australian English swampland
- Nettled: Irritated (especially with somebody)
- Nosh: A meal or spread of food
- Off-licence: Australian English bottle shop/Bottle-o
- Pavement: Australian English footpath
- Peaky: Unwell or sickly
- **(red or green) Pepper** (vegetable): Australian English capsicum
- **People carrier** (vehicle): Australian English people mover
- Pikey: An itinerant person. Similar to Australian English tramp
- Pillar box: Australian English post box
- Pillock: A mildly offensive term for a foolish or obnoxious person, similar to idiot or moron. Also refers to male genetalia
- **Plimsoll** (footwear): Australian English sandshoe
- Pneumatic drill: Australian English jackhammer
- **Polo neck** (garment): Australian English skivvy
- Poorly: Unwell or sick
- **Press-up** (exercise): Australian English push-up
- Pushchair: A wheeled cart for pushing a baby. Australian English: stroller or pram
- Pusher: A wheeled cart for pushing a baby. Australian English: stroller or pram
- Rodgering: A mildly offensive term for sexual intercourse, similar to Australian English rooting
- **Saloon** (car): Australian English sedan
- **Scratchings** (food): Solid material left after rendering animal (especially pork) fat. Australian English crackling
- Sellotape: Australian English sticky tape
- Shan't: Australian English will not
- **Skive** (verb): To play truant, particularly from an educational institution. Australian English to wag
- Sleeping policeman: Australian English speed hump or speed bump
- **Snog** (verb): To kiss passionately, equivalent to Australian English pash
- Sod: A mildly offensive term for an unpleasant person
- Spinney: A small area of trees and bushes
- Strimmer: Australian English whipper snipper or line trimmer
- **Swan** (verb): To move from one place to another ostentatiously
- Sweets: Australian English lollies
- Tailback: A long queue of stationary or slow-moving traffic
- Tipp-Ex: Australian English white out or liquid paper
- Trainers: Athletic footwear. Australian English runners or sneakers
- **Turning** (noun): Where one road branches from another. Australian English turn
- Utility room: A room containing washing or other home appliances, similar to Australian English laundry
- Value-added tax (VAT): Australian English goods and services tax (GST)
- Wellington boots: Australian English gumboots

American English terms not widely used in Australian English

- Acclimate: Australian English acclimatise
- Airplane: Australian English aeroplane
- Aluminum: Australian English aluminium
- Baby carriage: Australian English stroller or pram
- Bangs: A hair style. Australian English fringe
- **Baseboard** (architecture): Australian English skirting board
- Bayou: Australian English swamp, mangrove
- Bell pepper: Australian English capsicum
- Bellhop: Australian English hotel porter
- Beltway: Australian English ring road
- Boondocks: An isolated, rural area. Australian English the sticks or Woop Woop or Beyond the black stump or Out back of Bourke
- **Broil** (cooking technique): Australian English grill
- Bullhorn: Australian English megaphone
- Burglarize: Australian English burgle
- Busboy: A subclass of (restaurant) waiter
- Candy: Australian English lollies
- Cellular phone: Australian English mobile phone
- Check: (To mean a restaurant bill). Australian English bill
- Cilantro: Australian English coriander
- Comforter: Australian English doona
- Condominium: Australian English apartment
- Counter-clockwise: Australian English anticlockwise
- Coveralls: Australian English overalls
- Crapshoot: A risky venture
- Diaper: Australian English nappy
- Downtown: Australian English central business district or CBD
- Drapes: Australian English curtains
- Drugstore: Australian English pharmacy or chemist
- Drywall: Australian English plasterboard
- Dumpster: Australian English skip bin
- Dweeb: Australian English nerd
- Eraser: Australian English rubber
- **Fall** (season): Australian English autumn
- Fanny pack: Australian English bum bag
- Faucet: Australian English tap
- Flashlight: Australian English torch
- Freshman: A first year student at a highschool or university
- **Frosting** (cookery): Australian English icing
- Gasoline: Australian English petrol
- Gas pedal: Australian English accelerator
- Gas Station: Australian English service station or petrol station or servo
- Glove compartment: Australian English glovebox
- Golden raisin: Australian English sultana
- Grifter: Australian English con artist
- Ground beef: Australian English minced beef or mince
- **Hood** (vehicle): Australian English bonnet
- Hot tub: Australian English spa or spa bath
- Jell-o: Australian English jelly
- Ladybug: Australian English ladybird or lady beetle
- Mail-man: Australian English postman or postie
- Mass transit: Australian English public transport
- Math: Australian English maths
- Mineral spirits: Australian English turpentine
- Moon: Australian English chuck a brown eye
- Nightstand: Australian English bedside table
- Obligated: Australian English obliged
- Out-of-state: Australian English interstate
- Pacifier: Australian English dummy
- Parking lot: Australian English car park
- Penitentiary: Australian English prison or gaol
- **Period**(punctuation): Australian English full stop
- **Play hooky** (verb): To play truant from an educational institution. Equivalent to Australian English (to) wag
- Popsicle: Australian English ice block or icy pole
- Railroad: Australian English railway
- Railroad ties: Australian English Railway sleepers
- Rappel: Australian English abseil
- Realtor: Australian English real estate agent
- **Root** (sport): To enthusiastically support a sporting team. Equivalent to Australian English barrack, or To fornicate
- Row house: Australian English terrace house
- Sales tax: Australian English goods and services tax (GST)
- Saran wrap: Australian English plastic wrap or cling wrap
- Scad: Australian English a large quantity
- Scallion: Australian English spring onion
- **Sharpie** (pen): Australian English permanent marker or texta or felt pen
- Shopping cart: Australian English shopping trolley
- Sidewalk: Australian English footpath
- **Silverware** or flatware: Australian English cutlery
- Soda pop: Australian English soft drink
- Streetcar: Australian English tram
- Sweater: Garment. Australian English jumper
- Sweatpants: Australian English tracksuit pants/trackies
- Tailpipe: Australian English exhaust pipe
- Takeout: Australian English takeaway
- Trash can: Australian English garbage bin or rubbish bin
- **Trunk** (vehicle): Australian English boot
- Turn signal: Australian English indicator
- Turtleneck: Australian English skivvy
- **Upscale** and downscale: Australian English upmarket and downmarket
- Vacation: Australian English holiday
- Windshield: Australian English windscreen

== See also ==
- Australian English
- Australian comedy
- Diminutives in Australian English
- List of English words of Australian Aboriginal origin
- List of Australian place names of Aboriginal origin
- List of Australian plants termed "native"
- Strine
- Languages of Australia
