= Drought in Australia =

Rainfall deficiency in Australia

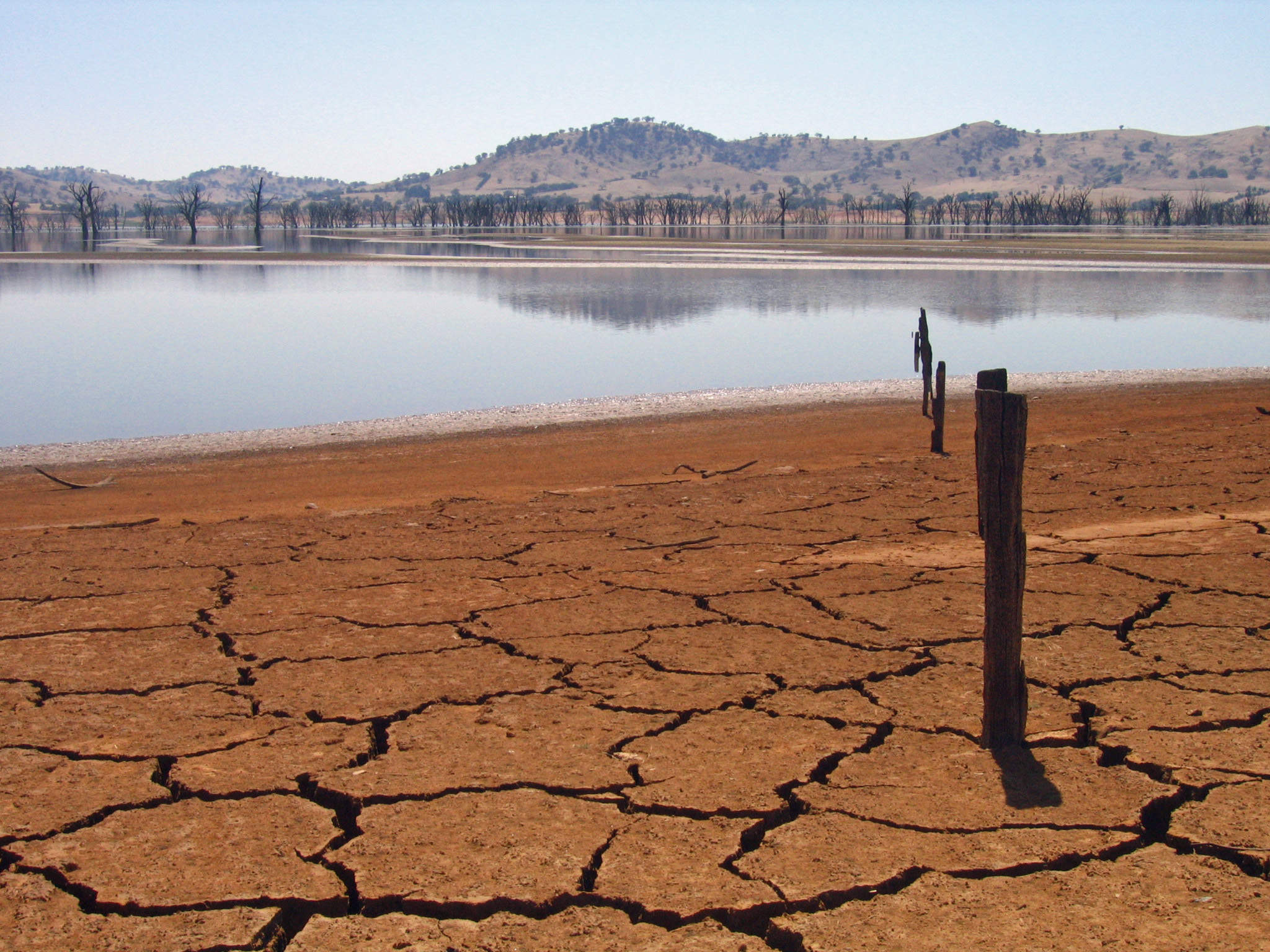
A dried up Lake Hume, 2007

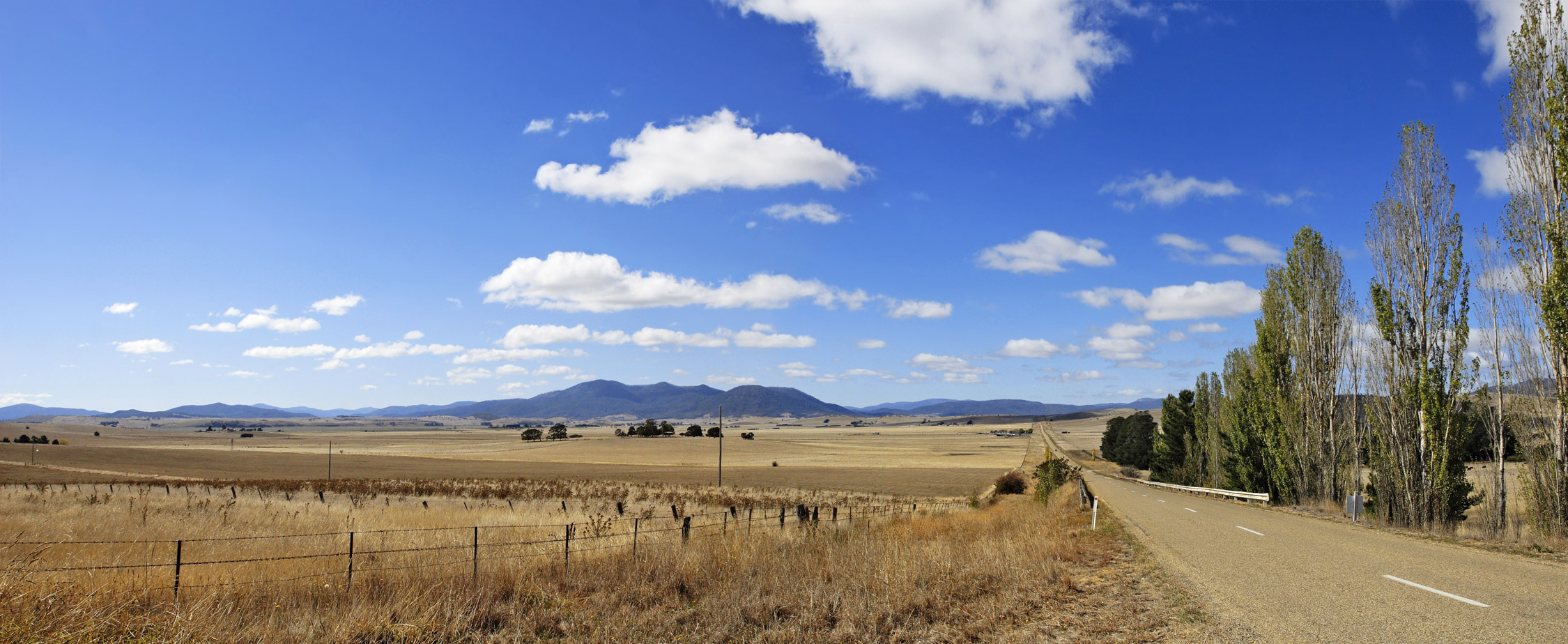
Drought-affected fields in the Victorian countryside, 2006

Drought in Australia is defined by the Australian Bureau of Meteorology as rainfall over spell greater than three-months being in the lowest decile of what has been recorded for that place in the past. This definition takes into account that drought is a relative term and rainfall deficiencies need to be compared to typical rainfall patterns including seasonal variations. Specifically, drought in Australia is defined in relation to a rainfall deficiency of pastoral leases and is determined by decile analysis applied to a certain area. Note that this definition uses rainfall only because long-term records are widely available across most of Australia. However, it does not take into account other variables that might be important for establishing surface water balance, such as evaporation and condensation.

Historical climatic records are now sufficiently reliable to profile climate variability taking into account expectations for regions. Bureau of Meteorology records since the 1860s have shown that a "severe" drought has occurred in Australia, on average, once every 18 years. State Governments are responsible for declaring a region drought affected and the declaration will take into account factors other than rainfall.

Australia has experienced a marked decrease in precipitation levels since 1994. Deficiencies in northern Australia increased in 2013–14, leading to an extended drought period in certain parts of Queensland. Between 2017 and 2019, severe drought developed once more across much of eastern and inland Australia including Queensland, New South Wales and Victoria, also extending into parts of South and Western Australia.

== Droughts in the 19th century ==
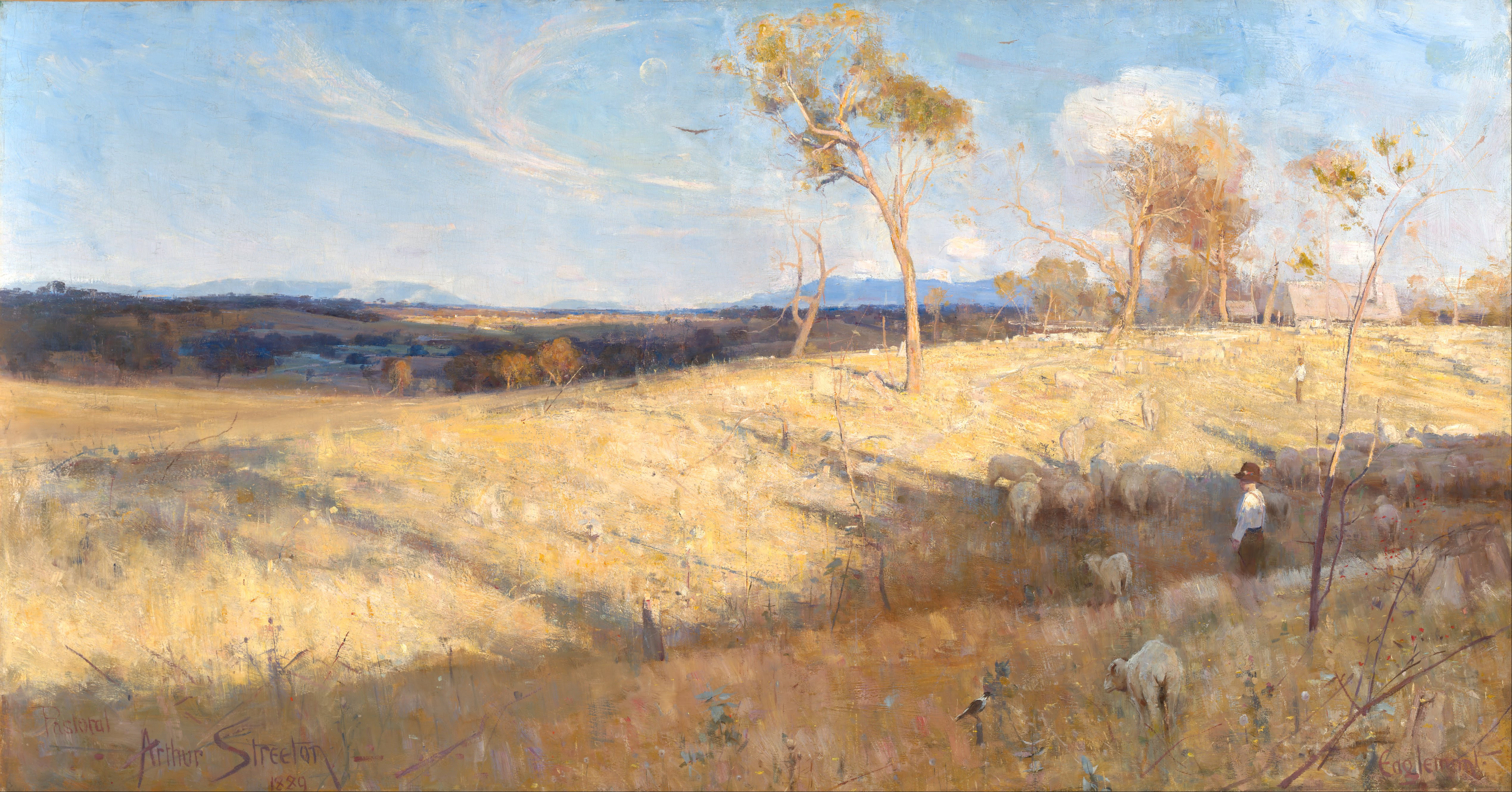
Golden Summer, Eaglemont, painted in 1889 by Heidelberg School artist Arthur Streeton, shows the semi-rural Melbourne suburb of Heidelberg during an El Niño drought.

- 1803 Drought in New South Wales (NSW) that produced several crop failures.
- 1809 Beginning of an unusually severe drought in NSW that continued until 1811.
- 1813–1815 Severe drought in NSW that prompted searches for new pastures.
- 1826–1829 Severe drought in NSW that caused Lake George to dry up and the Darling River to cease flowing.

Since 1860, when adequate meteorological recording commenced, the most severe droughts have occurred commonly at intervals of 11 to 14 years. Major droughts that were recorded later in the 19th century include:

- 1829 Major drought in Western Australia with very little water available.
- 1835 and 1838 Sydney and NSW receive 25% less rain than usual. Severe drought in Northam and York areas of Western Australia.
- 1838–39 Droughts in South Australia and Western Australia
- 1839 Severe drought in the west and north of Spencer Gulf, South Australia.
- 1846 Severe drought converted the interior and far north of South Australia into an arid desert.
- 1849 Sydney received about 27 inches less rain than normal.
- 1850 Severe drought, with big losses of livestock across inland New South Wales and around the western rivers region.
- 1864–1866 (and 1868). The little data available indicates that this drought period was rather severe in Victoria, South Australia, New South Wales, Queensland and Western Australia. This drought also helped fires in the Australia outback at the time.
- 1877 All states affected by severe drought, with disastrous losses in Queensland. In Western Australia many native trees died, swamps dried up and crops failed.
- 1880 to 1886 Drought in Victoria (northern areas and Gippsland); New South Wales (mainly northern wheat belt, Northern Tablelands and south coast); Queensland (1881–1886, in south-east with breaks – otherwise mainly in coastal areas, the central highlands and central interior in 1883–1886); and South Australia (1884–1886, mainly in agricultural areas).
- 1888 Extremely dry in Victoria (northern areas and Gippsland); Tasmania (1887–1889 in the south); New South Wales had the driest year since records began; Queensland (1888–89) had a very severe drought, with much native scrub dying and native animals perishing; South Australia had one of its most severe droughts; and Western Australia (central agricultural areas) lost many sheep.
- 1897 Drought in much of Queensland, compared to 1883–84 droughts.

== Drought in the 20th century ==
=== Federation drought ===
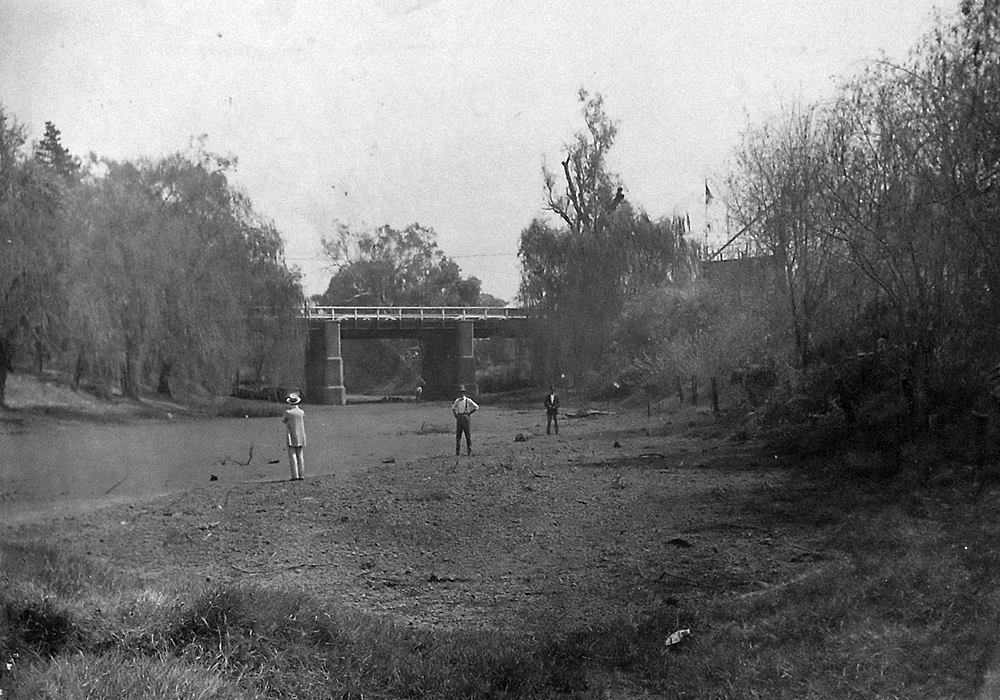
A dried-up lagoon in Wagga Wagga, New South Wales, during the 1912 drought.

At the time of Federation, Australia suffered a major drought. There had been a number of years of below average rainfall across most of Australia before the drought. During the drought, the wheat crop was "all but lost", and the Darling River was dry at Bourke, New South Wales, for over a year, from April 1902 to May 1903. There was concern about Sydney's water supply. By 1902, Australia's sheep population dropped from its 1891 level of 106 million to fewer than 54 million. Cattle numbers fell by more than 40 per cent. Sheep numbers did not return to 100 million until 1925.

In the 1911–1915 period, Australia suffered a major drought, which failed the 1914 wheat crop. From 1918 to 1920, a severe drought was experienced by Queensland, New South Wales, South Australia, Northern Territory (Darwin-Daly Waters area and central Australia), Western Australia (Fortescue area), Victoria, and Tasmania.

=== Other 20th century droughts ===
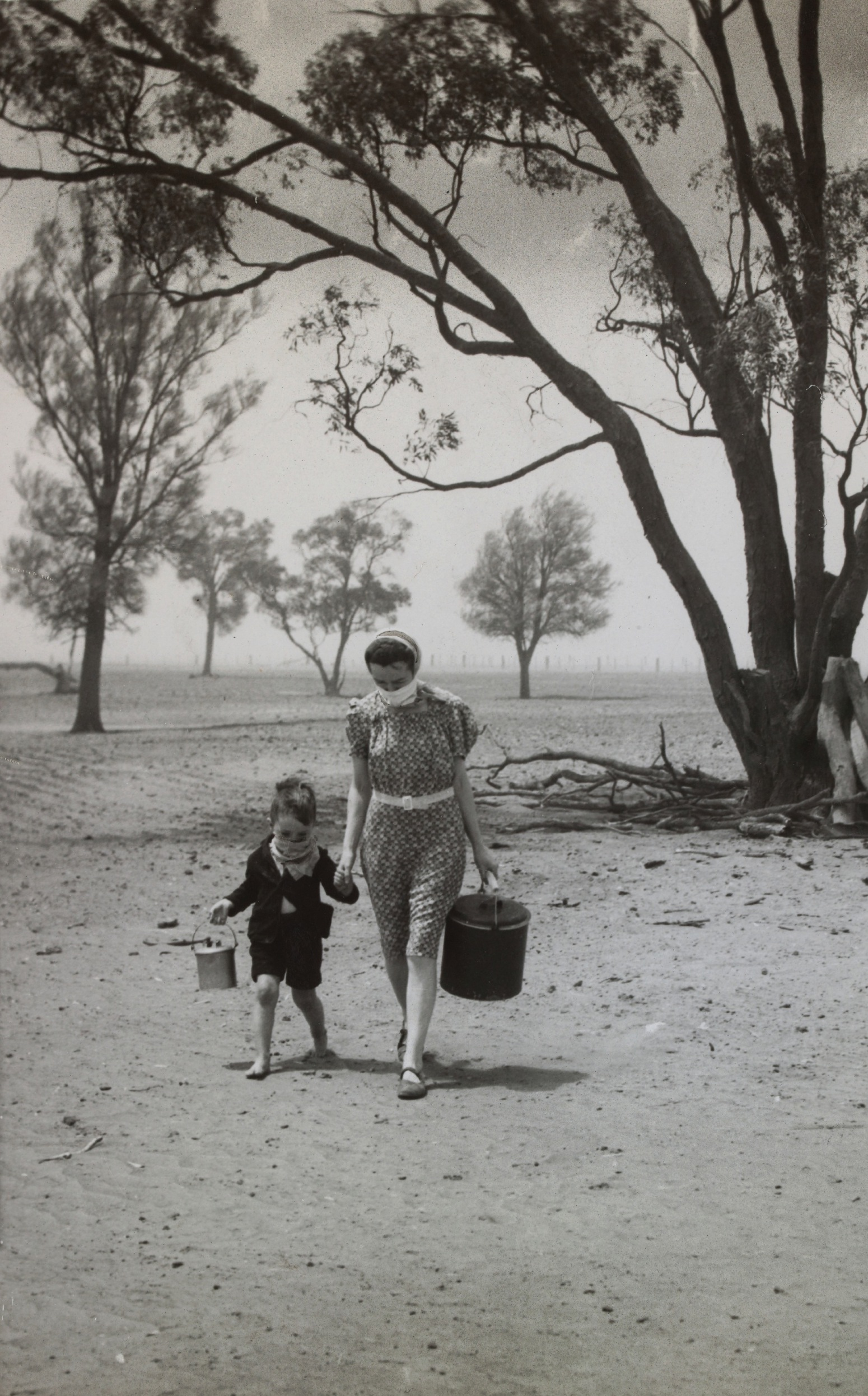
Mother and son masked against a dust storm cart water in the Wimmera, c.1944

==== World War II drought: 1937 to 1945 ====
During World War II frequent dry spells from 1937 to 1945 extended over New South Wales, Victoria, much of Queensland and parts of Western Australia, with more breaks than the Federation and Millennium droughts, but more periods of intense dryness. Parts of New South Wales, notably the central west, had record-low rainfall and in 1938 severe dry conditions intensified there and in Victoria, eastern South Australia and in southwest Australian grain-growing areas. An extremely dry six-month spell in Victorian forests contributed to the disastrous Black Friday bushfires of January 1939, before heavy rain came in late February 1939 over Victoria, South Australia and New South Wales.

The rains were only a brief respite, and 1940 was one of the driest years of the century over most of southern Australia, emptying the Nepean Dam in New South Wales and imposing water restrictions in Brisbane. Perth had its driest year of the 20th century. Heavy rain in the southeastern States in November 1940 and January 1941 slightly eased the situation and 1942 was a year of good general rain, but an even worse 1944 resulted when dearth of winter–spring rains led to failure of the wheat crop and required populations in northern Victoria to cart water. Into 1945, large rivers virtually dried up, with most of the Hunter River ceasing flow and the Hawkesbury drying up at North Richmond. There was no flow in the Murray above Echuca. Adelaide faced water shortages while main Victorian water storages were empty in April 1945 and water restrictions were imposed as far north as Townsville. Dust storms blanketed South Australia, northern Victoria and southern New South Wales through the summer of 1944–45.

Artist Russell Drysdale undertook a 3-week 5000km tour, at the height of WW2, of wind-eroded drought-stricken areas on commission from The Sydney Morning Herald. The articles written by Keith Newman, which were variously headed "The country in which there are no Bushfires. There is nothing to burn"; "Worst Drought in Australia's History"; and "An Artist's Journey Into Australia's 'Lost World'", were generously illustrated with stark line drawings by Drysdale and appeared on subsequent days from 16 to 19 December 1944.

The drought broke in the southern States in winter 1945, with a good wheat harvest that year, but in some regions of southern Queensland and northern New South Wales 1946, it was the worst year of all, and only in 1947 did significant general rains end the long drought.

==== Post World War II ====
In 1952, large regions across the North were affected by a failed wet season declared to be the "driest season for 50 years". Its effect on agriculture was profound, with millions of cattle dying, many because the stock routes south were too dry to sustain their journey. Artist Sidney Nolan, on commission from the Brisbane Courier-Mail, produced a series of photographs of their dried carcasses, but the results were judged by editors to be too confronting and the article carried his drawings from the pictures instead.

==== 1965–1968 drought ====
From 1965–1968, eastern Australia was again greatly affected by drought. Conditions had been dry over the centre of the continent since 1957 but spread elsewhere during the summer of 1964/1965. This drought contributed to the 1967 Tasmanian fires in which 62 people died in one day and 1,400 homes were lost.

==== 1980s ====
The drought in 1982–83 is regarded as the worst of the twentieth century for short-term rainfall deficiencies of up to one year and their over-all impact. There were severe dust storms in north-western Victoria and severe bushfires in south-east Australia in February 1983 with 75 people killed. This El Niño-related drought ended in March, when a monsoon depression became an extratropical low and swept across Australia's interior and on to the south-east in mid- to late March.

==== 1990s Queensland drought ====
An extremely severe drought occurred in the later year of 1991, which intensified in 1994 and 1995 to become the worst on record in Queensland. This drought was influenced by a strong El Niño weather pattern and associated with high temperatures in July and August 1995, the fifth continuous year of drought in parts of Queensland. According to Primary Industries Minister Ed Casey, "the drought affected region stretched in a 200 km to 300 km wide strip from Stanthorpe to Charters Towers". So few wheat and barley crops survived, about half the usual for that year, that grains had to be imported from other states.

In June 1994, more than ten towns had lost irrigation systems; and some areas had gone five years without decent rainfall.

A part of the upper Darling River system collapsed during this drought. By October 1994, the Condamine River was exhausted, reverting to a series of ponds. Across the state, in more than 13,000 properties, totaling 40% of Queensland, was drought declared. The flow past Goondiwindi was the lowest since 1940. Cotton farms near Moree and Narrabri had been allocated no water for irrigation, which resulted in a major loss of production. The town of Warwick was particularly affected.

== Drought in the 21st century ==
=== 2000s or "Millennium" drought in south-eastern Australia ===
From 1996 to 2010, south-eastern Australia experienced prolonged dry conditions with rainfall persistently well below average, particularly during the cooler months from April to October. The most acute period of the so-called "Millennium drought" was between 2001 and 2009. The drought finished with the arrival of wet La Niña conditions during 2010 and 2011, with particularly heavy summer rainfall.

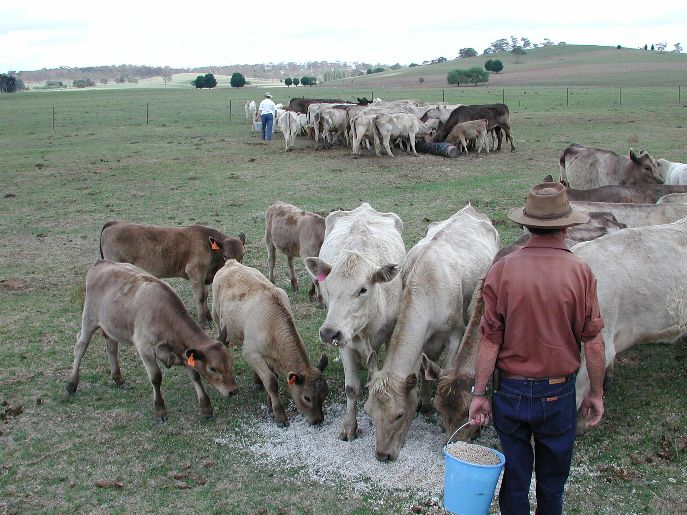
Green drought, caused by insufficient rain after a long dry period, November 2002

==== 1996 to 2000: patchy rainfall in the south-east ====
Dry conditions began to emerge in south-eastern Australia during late 1996 and intensified during the strong 1997 El Niño event. Rainfall in 1998, 1999 and 2000 was closer to average, with isolated areas affected by rainfall well below average.

==== 2001 to 2009: the peak of the drought ====
According to the Bureau of Meteorology, much of eastern Australia experienced a dry 2001. 2002 was one of Australia's driest and warmest years on record, with "remarkably widespread" dry conditions, particularly in the eastern half of the country, which was again affected by El Niño conditions. It was, at the time, Australia's fourth driest year since 1900.

The El Niño weather pattern broke down during 2003, but occasional strong rainfall in 2003 and 2004 failed to alleviate the cumulative effect of persistently low rainfall in south-eastern Australia, with some measurement stations having recorded below average rainfall for eight consecutive years. Rainfall in early 2005 remained below average, and better rainfall in the second half of the year again failed to break continuing drought conditions in the south-east.

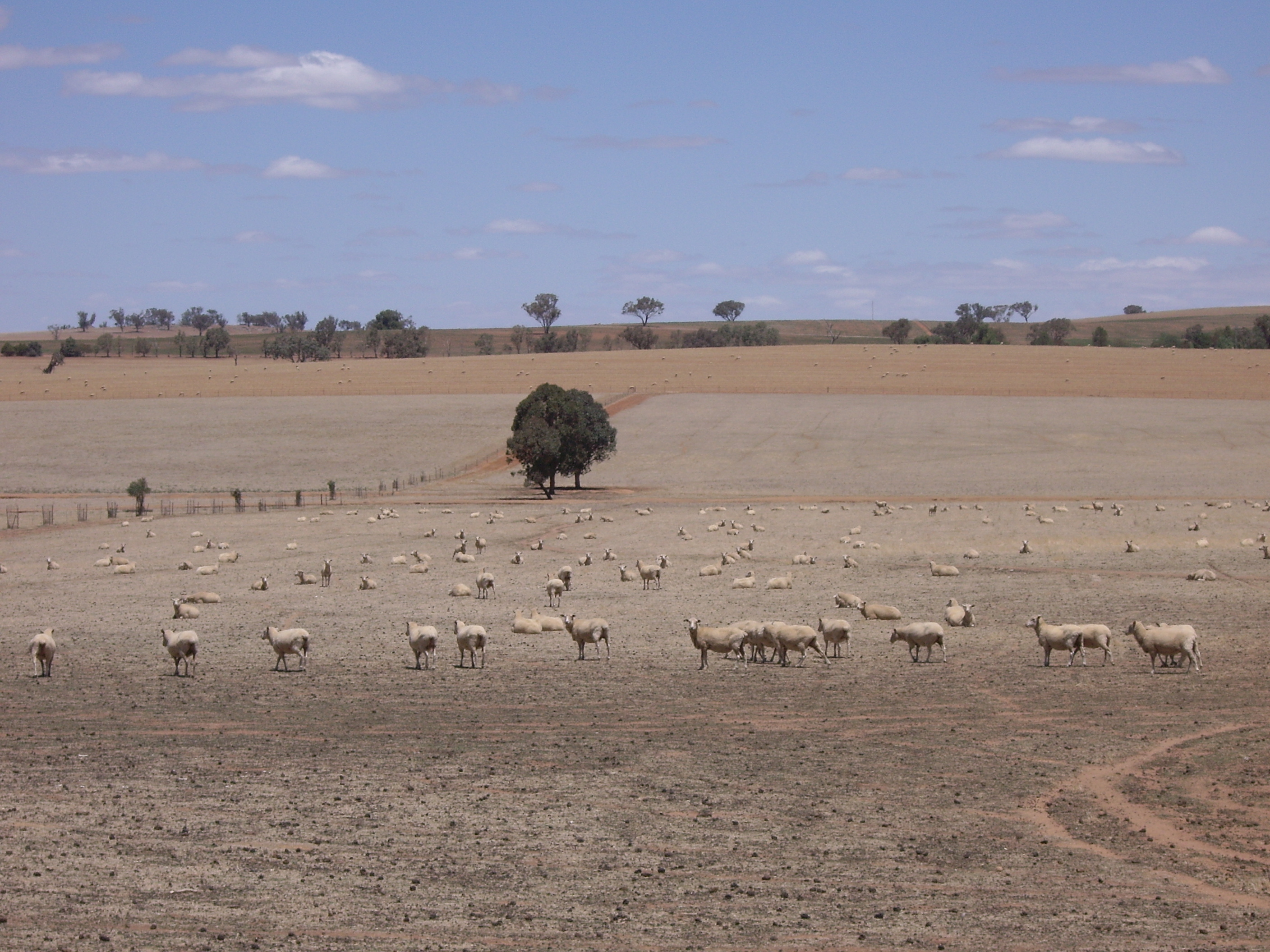
Dry paddocks in the Riverina region during the 2007 drought

South-east Australia experienced its second driest year on record in 2006, particularly affecting the major agricultural region of the Murray–Darling basin. 2007 saw record temperatures across the south of Australia, and only patchy rain; promising early year rains contrasted with a very dry July–October period, meaning that drought conditions persisted across much of the south-east. At this point, the Bureau of Meteorology estimated that south-eastern Australia had missed the equivalent of a full year's rain in the previous 11 years.

2008 and 2009 saw continuing hot and dry conditions in south-eastern Australia, with occasional heavy rainfall failing to break the continuing drought. The effects of the drought were exacerbated by Australia's (then) second hottest year on record in 2009, with record-breaking heatwaves in January, February and the second half of the year.

==== 2010 and 2011: La Niña finally breaks the drought ====
Australia's weather pattern transitioned rapidly to a wet La Niña pattern during autumn, resulting in record-breaking rains in the Murray–Darling Basin and well above average rainfall across the south-east. For many locations, this was the first year of above-average rainfall since 1996. The rainfall dramatically increased surface water storage and soil moisture, effectively ending the drought in the south-east. Very wet conditions continued through 2011, resulting in floods in Queensland and northern Victoria.

==== Effects on agricultural production ====
Dairy producers were hit particularly hard by the drought. 2004 was a particularly bleak year in the sector, with revenue in the industry falling by 5.6%.

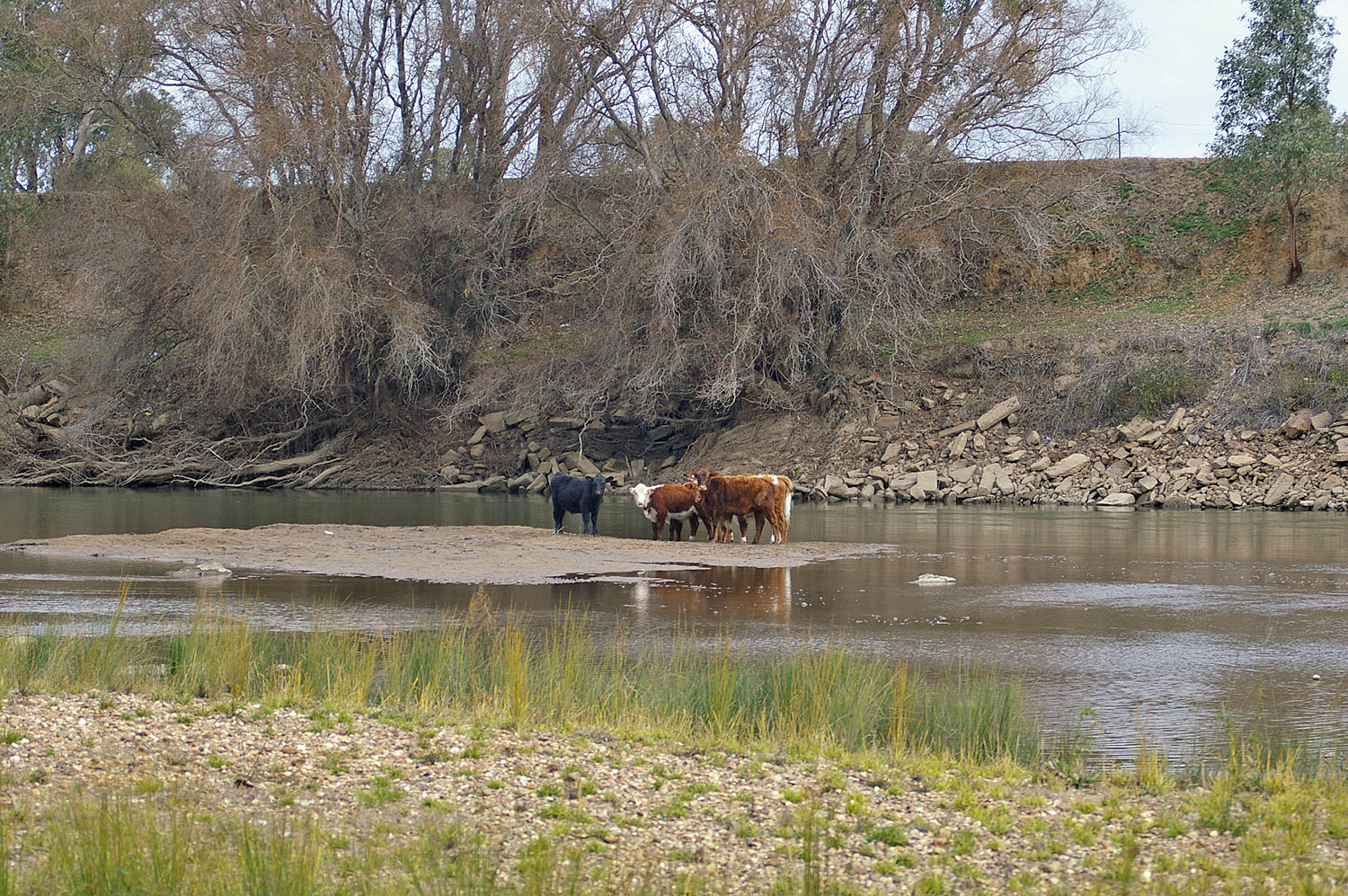
Cattle on a sand island in the Murrumbidgee River; normally underwater, but low rainfall in the catchment during 2008 meant water releases from the dams were reduced.

Agricultural production was affected. Water use by the industry fell by 37% between 2000/01 and 2004/05, due mainly to drought. Around 20 cotton communities and 10,000 people directly employed by the cotton industry were impacted by the drought. The main areas affected were in New South Wales: Menindee, where the area under production was reduced by 100%, Bourke, area reduced by 99%, Walgett by 95%, the Macquarie River by 74% and Gwydir River by 60%. In Queensland, the worst-affected areas were Biloela, which reduced the area under production by 100%, Dirranbandi, by 91%, Central Highlandsby 82% and Darling Downs by 78%. Bourke has only had adequate water for one cotton crop in the last five years.

Dry conditions again began to develop and be sustained in mid-2013 through much of western Queensland. Although these began easing for western Queensland in early 2014, drought began to develop further east, along the coastal fringe and into the ranges of southeast Queensland and northeast New South Wales.

Dry conditions continued into 2015 in the east, particularly in Queensland where the monsoon rains were delayed. Queensland had experienced poor wet season rains for three consecutive seasons. Wetter conditions in 2016 eased the effects of drought in eastern Australia, but pockets of south-east Queensland and north-east New South Wales remained drier than average.

Stock feed becomes scarce and farmers find it difficult to feed cattle and sheep.

=== Early 2017 to late 2019 ===
==== Meteorological conditions ====
2017 was a drier than average year for much of inland Queensland, most of New South Wales, eastern and central Victoria, and all of Tasmania. In 2018, rainfall for the year was very low over the southeastern quarter of the Australian mainland, with much of the region experiencing totals in the lowest 10% of historical observations, and was particularly low over the mainland southeast from April onwards. The state of New South Wales was declared to be 100% in drought by August 2018, remaining at 98.6% into May 2019; by May 2019 65.2% of Queensland was also declared to be in drought. Two southern parts of Western Australia were declared "water deficient" by May 2019 after months of drought, with other drought affected areas including central and east Gippsland in Victoria, and parts of eastern South Australia. On one-to-two-year timeframes to the end of March 2019, rainfall deficiencies in the Murray–Darling Basin, Australia's most extensive river system, were the third lowest on record, behind similar length timeframes between 1901 and 1903, and between 1918 and 1920. In July 2019, climatologist David Jones from the Australian Bureau of Meteorology stated that the present drought was now officially the worst on record in the Murray–Darling Basin, and "had now exceeded the Federation Drought, the WWII drought and the Millennium drought in terms of its severity through the MDB". In October 2019, Australia's Bureau of Meteorology stated that drier and warmer and drier than average conditions were expected to persist at least until the end of the year with no relief in sight for most of the drought affected areas, influenced at least in part by a positive Indian Ocean Dipole and a prolonged period of negative SAM (Southern Annular Mode) during October and November. Exacerbating the effects of diminished rainfall in this drought has been a record breaking run of above average monthly temperatures, lasting 36 months to October 2019.

As of December 2019 the drought was continuing – including the driest November across Australia on record – but the Bureau of Meteorology reported that the positive Indian Ocean Dipole had weakened to around 50% of its peak seen in mid October, possibly indicating a future improvement in conditions later in the Australian summer.

From 7 to 10 February 2020, many areas on the east coast of New South Wales received heavy and continuous rain, the heaviest falls for thirty years. 391.6 millimetres (15.42 in) of rain fell over the four days in Sydney, more than three times the February average. Flooding was extensive, including areas such as Lake Conjola, that had been devastated by bushfires about 6 weeks earlier. About 28,500 people were affected by this drought.

In March 2021, above average rainfall led to serious and destructive flooding in the Hawkesbury-Nepean catchment and on the Mid North Coast of New South Wales.

==== Australian Government response ====
In November 2013 the Australian Government released a $500 million drought stimulus package, including an additional $2 million in loans under the Regional Investment Corporation under a reconfigured payment schedule, an extension to the existing Drought Communities Program which provides money to regional Councils, and supplementary payments under the Roads to Recovery program to assist with job creation in drought-affected areas. The plan also provided $100 million for South Australia to turn on its Adelaide Desalination Plant to significantly ramp up production of water to supply the Adelaide metropolitan area, to allow farmers affected by drought to access more water from the Murray River upstream. This followed the release of a $170 million Drought Stimulus Package by the New South Wales State Government in June.

==== 2019 bushfires ====
Dry conditions in September 2019 contributed to several small to mid-range fires in north eastern New South Wales. By November of that year, continuing heat and lack of rain had desiccated the forests and agricultural land along the Great Dividing range in New South Wales and Queensland. Sydney received less than 2 millimetres (0.079 in) of rain in December 2019, with temperatures reaching 40°C (104°F). Numerous intense bushfires occurred, some of which burnt Gondwanan rainforest remnants that had not experienced fires for millennia. This included Mount Nothofagus National Park and Nightcap National Park.

== Future projections ==
Australia's national science research agency, the Commonwealth Scientific and Industrial Research Organisation (CSIRO), states that on account of projected future climate change, hot days will become more frequent and hotter (very high confidence), extreme rainfall events will become more intense (high confidence), and the time in drought is projected to increase over southern Australia (high confidence). Seasonal-average rainfall changes will vary across Australia: in southern mainland Australia, winter and spring rainfall is projected to decrease (high confidence), but increases are projected for Tasmania in winter (medium confidence), while in eastern and northern Australia in the near future (to 2030), natural variability is anticipated to predominate over trends due to greenhouse gas emissions. However even if climate change does not result in decreased rainfall in eastern and northern Australia over the period to 2030, the perceived severity of drought (in terms of low soil moisture) would increase on account of the higher evaporative demand resulting from the projected overall rise in average temperatures.

== See also ==
- Climate change in Australia
- Deserts of Australia
- Extreme weather
- List of reservoirs and dams in Australia
- Peak water
- Send her down Hughie
- Water restrictions in Australia
- Effects of the El Niño–Southern Oscillation in Australia
