= 1979–1983 Eastern Australian drought =

Natural disaster in Australia

Between 1979 and 1983 almost all of eastern Australia was affected by a major drought.

Although in some places such as the South Coast the drought was almost continuous, in most of the affected region the major years of drought were 1980 and 1982.

== Background ==
The 1970s had been an exceptionally wet decade over eastern Australia, despite short-term droughts from April to August 1976 and June to December 1977. 1978 was especially wet in the southern coast districts of New South Wales and East Gippsland because southern low pressure systems consistently redeveloped over the east coast. Orbost's 1978 rainfall of 1,559 millimetres (61.4 in) is as much as 256 mm (10 inches) above its previous record from 1935. In the winter, unseasonal rains struck normally bone-dry areas of northern Australia, and the wet season arrived early in the north in October. Though the Wet was not abnormally powerful in November and December, southeastern Australia remained exceptionally wet.

== 1979 ==
The year 1979 began with extraordinarily hot conditions over southern Australia. Both livestock and wild animals perished in great numbers due to the heatwave, which saw places in northern South Australia regularly reach temperatures of at least 45 °C (113 °F) from 31 December 1978 to 15 January 1979. In Western Australia, the Nullarbor region settlements of Mundrabilla and Forrest both reached maxima of 49.8 °C (121.6 °F), the sixth-highest recorded temperatures in Australia, on 3 and 13 January 1979, respectively. Temperatures reached 40 °C (104 °F) in Sydney and in that summer's Ashes Test match, Australia's wicket keeper retired from heat exhaustion.

Rain fell heavily in the Mallee later in the month, making it a record wet month in many parts of western Victoria and far western New South Wales. The southeast corner, however, was already very dry. February and March saw a continuing powerful monsoon, but except for the Mallee in February and the east coast from Newcastle to Triabunna in March, southeastern Australia was dry. April had fairly normal rainfall except for continuing wet in Cape York Peninsula and dry conditions around Sydney and Hobart, where rainfall deficiencies were already acute.

Heavy May rainfall over the wheat belt did not mask dry conditions around Canberra and especially in eastern Tasmania. June, however, proved the first really dry month: both Canberra and Hobart had their driest June ever, and Melbourne also set a record for low rainfall in July as cold fronts utterly failed to reach their normal latitudes.

August and September, however, saw a series of tropical/extratropical interactions produce exceptional rainfall over most of Victoria, South Australia, western New South Wales and Tasmania. Flooding occurred in the Murray Basin and northern Tasmania. The coastal districts of New South Wales and southern Queensland, however, became extremely dry by September. Despite continuing heavy rains over south Australia, the Mallee and the Wimmera through spring, a dry November and near-record dry December ensured 1979 was the driest year until 2006 in Hobart and the driest since 1907 in Orbost.

Further north, although an area of the Darling Downs had had heavy rainfall in October, the wet season was very late and had not set in by December.

== 1980 ==
Heavy rains in East Gippsland in January proved a false forecast of what was to come, for in southeastern Australia February and March were exceptionally dry. Brisbane had its second-driest March on record, and apart from scattered areas the northern monsoon was modest. In the drier wheat country, many stations in the Mallee and adjacent parts of South Australia were completely rainless throughout the 1979/1980 summer, while the January rains that temporarily relieved the drought in East Gippsland did not reach Hobart.

April began very warm and dry, but an extensive upper low followed by a vigorous cold front on the 22nd made this an extremely wet month in South Australia, far western New South Wales, western Victoria and northern Tasmania. However, in most of New South Wales this blocking high produced uninterrupted dry weather. At Canberra, it was the driest April on record, and a remarkable feature of the month was that the highest rainfalls in New South Wales occurred in the normally dry Western Division.

A cyclonic storm in May led to floods on the North Coast, but from June drought again set in over the eastern coastal belt between Bundaberg and Hobart. August and September were particularly dry. In these months Sydney received only 15 millimetres (0.6 in) and water restrictions were imposed on the city's residents. Elsewhere in eastern Australia the winter had near normal rainfall but was exceptionally warm, while September's dryness extended to every part of the mainland except alpine areas and the southern coastline, where the mild, wet weather was producing good conditions despite the burden of agisting cattle from drought-stricken areas.

Although October was very wet in South Australia, western Victoria, and southern Queensland, drought-affected areas of New South Wales did not get significant rain until December, when hot, humid and unsettled weather brought some relief from the driest February to November period over the southeast corner since 1915.

Nonetheless, in most of the Hunter Basin, including Newcastle, 1980 was the driest year ever recorded. In some stations on the South Coast it was the driest since 1888. The wet season had also been very late over the tropics.

== 1981 ==
The hot, humid weather of December continued throughout summer. January saw the most active monsoon since 1974 over Queensland: Hughenden received 422 millimetres (16.6 in), or as much as 85 percent of its normal annual rainfall, while in the Wet Tropics rainfall was extraordinarily heavy: Babinda received a remarkable 2,560 millimetres (100.8 in) for the month. February was also wet, with Brisbane reporting its best rains since March 1974. In western Tasmania, however, unusually hot and dry conditions led to a very rare fire in the wet forests near Zeehan. In New South Wales, January was dry, but February saw very heavy rains that temporarily broke the long drought.

March and April were generally dry except for Tasmania and a belt of western New South Wales in March and the North Coast of New South Wales in April. April was also very hot. However, the May to August period was exceptionally wet over Victoria (except East Gippsland), inland New South Wales and South Australia. A constant flow of powerful lows made this period the wettest on record over Victoria, and the Murray Basin experienced major flooding in August.

May–normally a generally dry month–was also very wet in inland Queensland, with Hughenden receiving 107 millimetres (4.2 in) against a median rainfall of 4 millimetres (0.16 in), while July’s heavy southern rainfall also extended into that State. Although rainfall in the winter over the coastal belt was below normal, except on the South Coast of New South Wales February and May rains had already eliminated drought for the moment.

However, except for November when Brisbane received a record total of 413 millimetres (16.3 in) and heavy rain extended as far south as inland Victoria, and useful rains over coastal New South Wales and Queensland in October and December, the last third of 1981 was very dry and hot. In the Western District of Victoria it was the driest such period since 1967, with some places having record low totals in both September and December.

== 1982 ==
The year again began with extremely hot conditions in southern Australia: in Melbourne, the mean maximum for the weekends of January to March was a remarkable 29.3 °C (84.7 °F). Although February was exceptionally dry, rainfall for January and March was on the whole above average, with the northern inland of New South Wales having its wettest March since 1931 and dry conditions appearing relieved.

April, however, saw dry conditions immediately return. Large falls late in the month over the settled areas of South Australia and a heavy cyclone over the Wet Tropics were not followed up. Though in May Tasmania and West Gippsland had good rainfall, most of New South Wales and Queensland except for the Brisbane area was already very dry.

With the 1982–83 El Niño event developing from June, things steadily became much worse. Huge high-pressure systems over Australia ensured very limited rain and consistent severe frosts in June. The month was the driest on record over many inland areas of New South Wales. July was much worse still, for apart from coastal areas there was almost no rain and in many areas of the wheat belt frosts reached levels never seen since temperature records began. Despite scattered July rainfall in East Gippsland, August was even worse, for the dry conditions were accompanied by quite remarkable heat as the anticyclones this time pushed hot, dry air from central Australia, with the only significant rainfall being on the Wet Tropical coast where Innisfail and Babinda had over 500 millimetres (20 in). Late in the month temperatures reached 29.5 °C (85.1 °F) in Mildura and overall mean maxima inland were as much as 4 °C (7 °F) above normal, causing ripening of wheat crops that had failed to develop in the cold, dry weather of previous months.

September saw useful rains over southwestern New South Wales, West Gippsland, and southeastern Tasmania, along with very heavy falls on the North Coast–but no rain fell in the wheat districts where the drought was already developing into a record dry spell. October again saw heavy rain on the North Coast, but was very dry elsewhere, while November apart from western Tasmania and a small part of the Wet Tropics was very hot and almost rainless apart from thunderstorms mid-month. Bushfires broke out in East Gippsland and continued burning for several months. December saw some heavy thunderstorm rains in northeastern New South Wales and a single major rain event over the Port Phillip region and northeastern Tasmania, but extremely dry conditions continued elsewhere.

For the nine months from April to December 1982, most of inland eastern Australia experienced its lowest rainfall on record, as did parts of the South Gippsland. In the North Wimmera district covering Victoria's best wheat areas, the 1982 rainfall for this period was less than half the previous record low. Many wheat crops failed completely for the first time in decades, and overall Victoria's yield was its lowest since 1944, while that of New South Wales was the lowest since 1957 and South Australia the lowest since 1977.

== 1983 ==
Although the year began with cool conditions over southeastern Australia, the monsoon was extremely weak in the north. February saw a turn back towards very hot weather, with Melbourne having three days over 40 °C (104 °F) for only the second time on record. A huge dust storm carried away 50 million tonnes of the topsoil from the Mallee and Wimmera, and then the Ash Wednesday bushfires ravaged the tinder-dry forests of southeastern Australia. More than 70 people were killed, while fires moved from Gippsland into the South Coast of New South Wales.

Late February saw scattered very heavy thunderstorms over New South Wales, but the month was close to the driest on record over Tasmania and Victoria and very dry again over the tropics. The beginning of March, however, saw torrential thunderstorms over the settled areas of South Australia, flooding areas that were fire-stricken only two weeks beforehand. Hot, humid weather continued throughout eastern Australia for the next three weeks as the monsoon suddenly became extremely powerful. On 21 March, a powerful monsoonal low moved southwards, drenching western New South Wales and the South Coast, and then western Victoria, Gippsland and Eastern Tasmania. At Tanybryn in the Otways, 375 millimetres (14.8 in) fell for the 24 hours ending 22 March, flooding the rebuilt Great Ocean Road. The month of March was the wettest since 1910 over most of the Mallee and Wimmera and since 1946 over the rest of western Victoria.

Although the western slopes of New South Wales and most of eastern Queensland missed the heavy rains of March, both April and May were exceptionally wet over these regions as upper-level flows came in consistently from the north. The autumn of 1983 was the wettest over Queensland as a whole, and by May much of the Darling Downs was flooded. Steady, consistent rains for the rest of the year ensured a record wheat crop over most of Australia, with yields at levels that have never been equalled since.

== See also ==
- Great Chilean drought of 1968–1969
- El Niño
- Drought in Australia
