= Climate of Australia =

Köppen climate types in Australia

The climate of Australia is the second driest of any continent, after Antarctica. According to the Bureau of Meteorology (BOM), 80% of the land receives less than 600 mm (24 in) of rainfall annually and 50% has even less than 300 mm (12 in). As a whole, Australia has a very low annual average rainfall of 419 mm (16 in).

This dryness is governed mostly by the subtropical high pressure belt (subtropical ridge), which brings dry air from the upper atmosphere down onto the continent. This high pressure is typically to the south of Australia in the summer and over the north of Australia in the winter. Hence Australia typically has dry summers in the south and dry winters in the north. The Intertropical Convergence Zone also moves south in Australia's summer, bringing the Australian monsoon to parts of northern Australia. The climate is variable, with frequent droughts lasting several seasons, caused in part by the El Niño-Southern Oscillation. Australia has a wide variety of climates due to its large geographical size. The largest part of Australia is desert or semi-arid. Only the south-east and south-west corners have a temperate climate and moderately fertile soil. The northern part of the country has a tropical climate, varying between grasslands and desert, and subject to some of the largest interannual rainfall variability in the world. Australia holds many heat-related records: the continent has the hottest extended region year-round, the areas with the hottest summer climate, and the highest sunshine duration.

Because Australia is separated from polar regions by the Southern Ocean, it is not subject to movements of frigid polar air during winter, of the type that sweep over the continents in the northern hemisphere during their winter. Consequently, Australia's winter is relatively mild, with less contrast between summer and winter temperatures than in the northern continents–though the transition is more dramatically marked in the far inland areas, particularly west of the Great Dividing Range. Seasonal highs and lows can still be considerable. Temperatures have ranged from above 50 °C (122 °F) to as low as −23.0 °C (−9.4 °F). Minimum temperatures are moderated.

The El Niño–Southern Oscillation is associated with seasonal abnormality in many areas in the world. Australia is one of the continents most affected and experiences extensive droughts alongside considerable wet periods. Occasionally a dust storm will blanket a region and there are reports of the occasional tornado. Tropical cyclones, heat waves, bushfires and frosts in the country are also associated with the Southern Oscillation. Rising levels of salinity and desertification in some areas is ravaging the landscape.

Climate change in Australia is a highly contentious political issue. Temperatures in the country rose by approximately 0.7 °C between 1910 and 2004, following an increasing trend of global warming. Overnight minimum temperatures have warmed more rapidly than daytime maximum temperatures in recent years. The late-20th century warming has been largely attributed to the increased greenhouse effect.

== States and territories ==
=== Australian Capital Territory ===
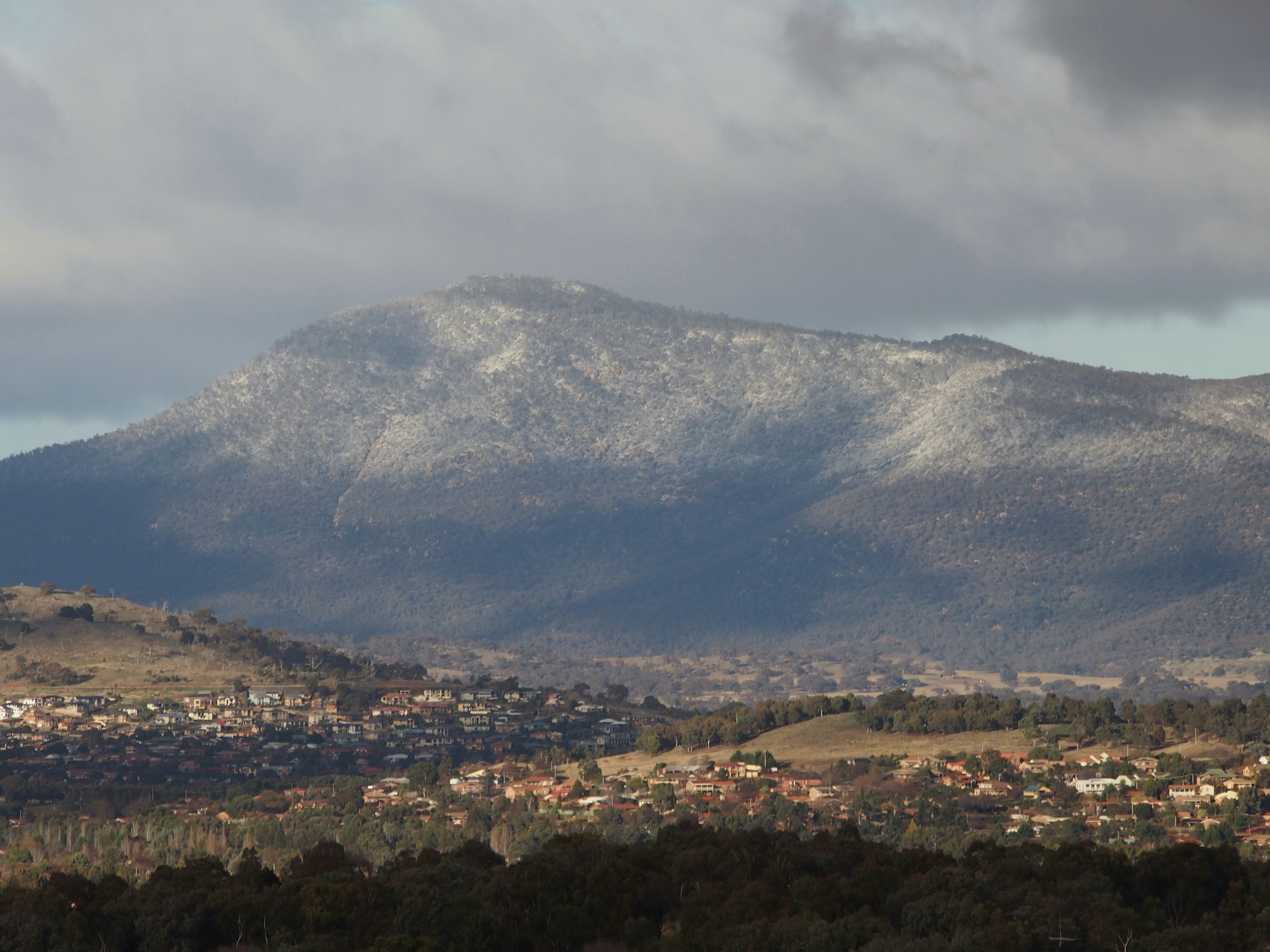
Light snow on Mount Tennent, which features dry sclerophyll woodlands.

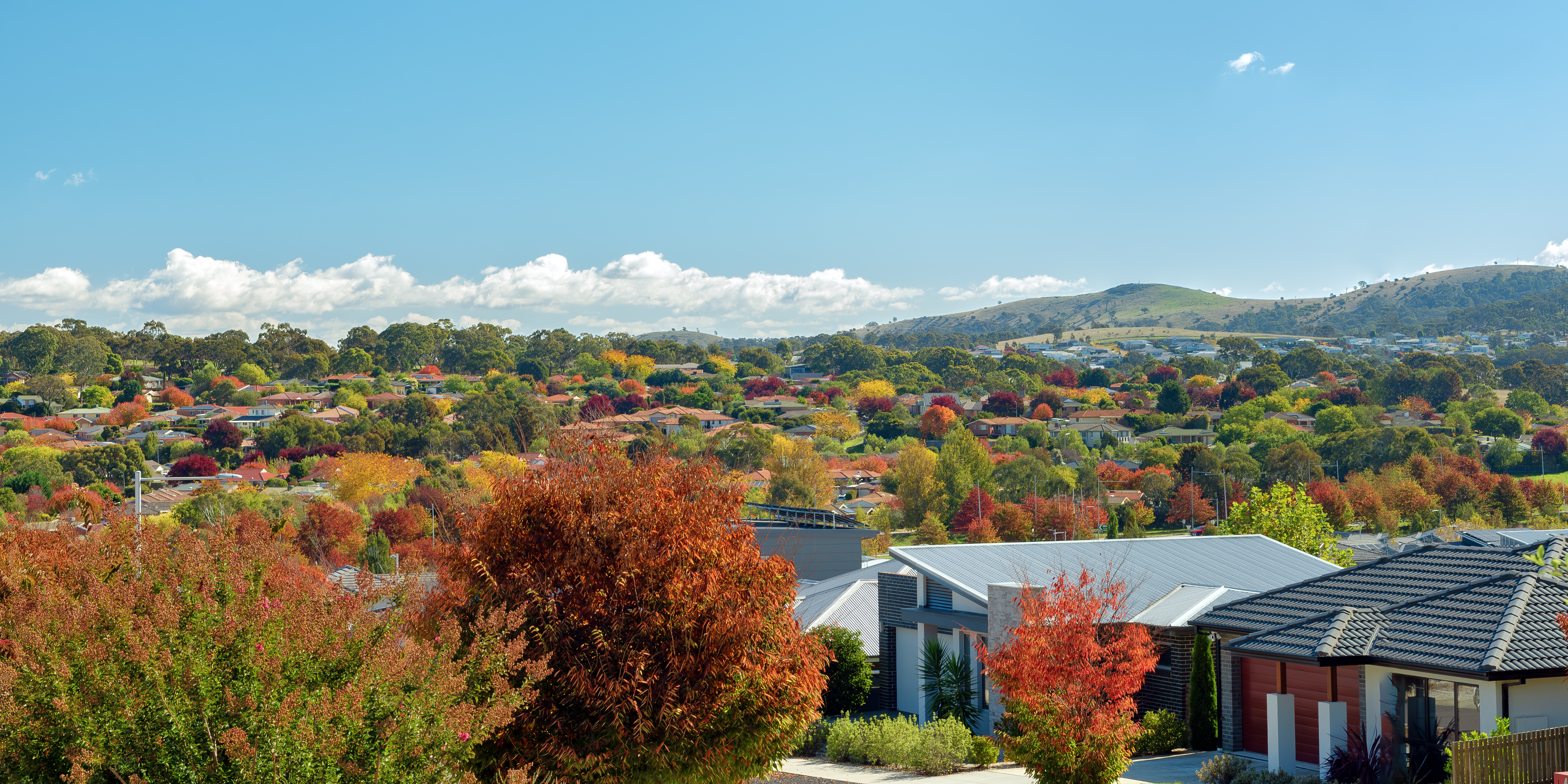
Autumn foliage in Canberra.

Because of its higher general elevation of over 650 m (2,130 ft), southern latitude and entirely landlocked location, winters are exclusively cool to cold in the Australian Capital Territory. Canberra has warm, dry summers with cool nights and some thunderstorms. Heavy frosts are commonplace and radiation fog often occurs. Many of the higher mountains to the territory's west are snow-covered for a large part of the winter and early spring. Severe thunderstorms can occur between October and March, and annual rainfall is 623 mm (25 in), with rainfall highest in spring and summer, and lowest in winter. The region is dry throughout its entirety due to its position on the leeward side of the Brindabella Ranges.

The highest temperature recorded in the ACT was 44.0 °C (111.2 °F) at Canberra Airport on 4 January 2020. The lowest temperature was −14.6 °C (5.7 °F) at Gudgenby on 11 July 1971.

=== New South Wales ===
Köppen climate classification map of New South Wales

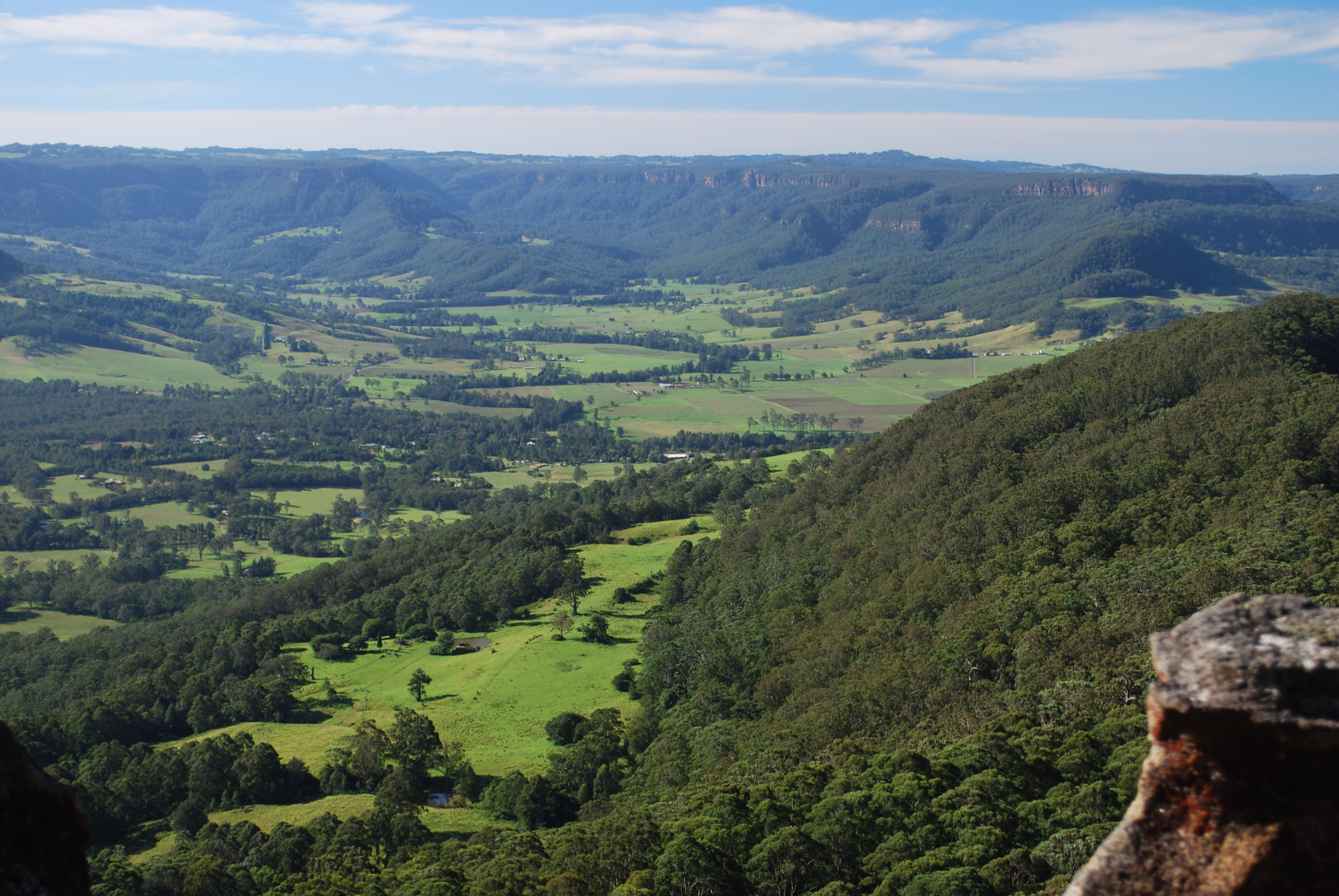
Temperate grasslands in the Kangaroo Valley, typical along the eastern coast of the state.

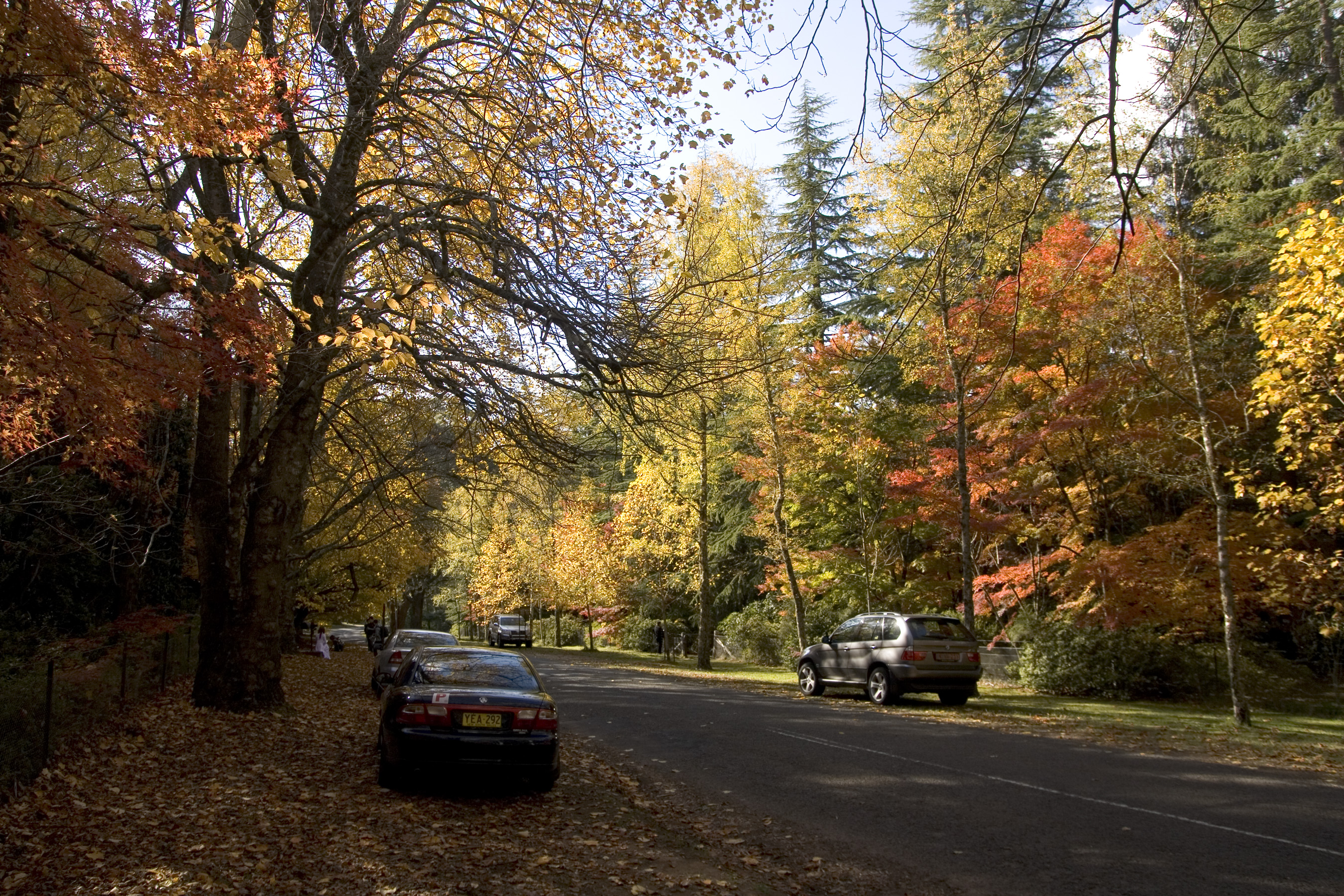
Autumn at Mount Wilson.

Over half of New South Wales has an arid or semi-arid climate. The eastern portion has a temperate climate, ranging from humid subtropical from its northern border to the Central Coast and most of Sydney, and oceanic to the south coast. The Snowy Mountains region in the south-east falls in the alpine climate or subpolar oceanic climate zone, with cool to cold weather all year around and regular heavy snowfalls in the winter and spring. Further inland, the climate is semi-arid and a desert climate towards the western part of the state.

The weather in the southern half of the state is generally warm to hot in summer and cool in the winter. The seasons are more defined in the southern half of the state, especially in the South West Slopes, Central West and the Riverina regions. On the coast and anywhere east of the dividing range, a summer rainfall peak is observed throughout its entire latitudinal span. On the ranges and farther inland, rainfall usually peaks in spring in most parts of the state; though the South West Slopes region, in the south-central part of the state (bordering Victoria), has a distinct winter rainfall peak; whereas the New England and North West Slopes regions have a summer rainfall peak. On a hot summer day, a southerly buster may at times moderate the extreme heat experienced in the coastal New South Wales region, from Port Macquarie southwards to Nowra.

The warmest region by annual maxima is the Upper Western, where summers are extremely hot, but winters relatively cooler and dry. The weather in the northeast region of the state, or the North Coast, bordering Queensland, is moderately hot, humid and rainy in the summer, and mild in winter with more sunshine; and little seasonal temperature difference. The Northern Tablelands have relatively milder summers and colder winters, due to their high elevation and inland location on the Great Dividing Range. The southeast coastal plain, which lies on the leeward side of the Great Dividing Range, experiences foehn winds, particularly between winter and spring, which can elevate fire danger.

The coldest region is the Snowy Mountains where the snow and ice continues for a long period during the winter months. The Blue Mountains, Southern Tablelands and Central Tablelands, which are situated on the Great Dividing Range, have mild to warm summers and cold winters, although not as severe as those in the Snowy Mountains. The areas situated in the valleys of the range, such as Bathurst, Goulburn, Bowral and Cooma, among other places, have recorded freezing and/or near-freezing lows even in the summer months, unlike other places of similar latitude and altitude in the northern hemisphere.

The highest maximum temperature recorded was 50.1 °C (122.2 °F) at Wilcannia in the state's north-west on 11 January 1939. The lowest minimum temperature was −23.0 °C (−9.4 °F) at Charlotte Pass on 29 June 1994 in the Snowy Mountains. This is also the lowest temperature recorded in the whole of Australia excluding Australian Antarctic Territory.

Rainfall varies throughout the state. The far northwest receives the least, less than 180 mm (7 in) annually, while the east receives between 600 and 1,200 mm (24 and 47 in) of rain.

Labelled map of New South Wales showing where the places mentioned in the table are located

Place	Climate type	January mean max. temp	January mean min. temp	July mean max. temp	July mean min. temp	No. clear days	Annual precipitation
Albury	Cfa	30.9 °C (88 °F)	16.7 °C (62 °F)	12.3 °C (54 °F)	4.1 °C (39 °F)	111.4	701.6 mm (28 in)
Armidale	Cfb	26.3 °C (79 °F)	13.6 °C (56 °F)	12.2 °C (54 °F)	1.4 °C (35 °F)	118.9	794.2 mm (31 in)
Broken Hill	BWh	33.8 °C (93 °F)	19.4 °C (67 °F)	15.6 °C (60 °F)	4.9 °C (41 °F)	137.3	248.8 mm (10 in)
Charlotte Pass	Cfc/Dfc	17.6 °C (64 °F)	5.1 °C (41 °F)	1.9 °C (35 °F)	−6.7 °C (20 °F)	77.5	2,020.9 mm (80 in)
Coffs Harbour	Cfa	28.2 °C (83 °F)	20.2 °C (68 °F)	19.9 °C (68 °F)	7.9 °C (46 °F)	122.1	1,702.4 mm (67 in)
Orange	Cfb	27.4 °C (81 °F)	13.0 °C (55 °F)	9.9 °C (50 °F)	0.6 °C (33 °F)	99.8	892.8 mm (35 in)
Penrith	Cfa	30.8 °C (87 °F)	18.6 °C (65 °F)	18.0 °C (64 °F)	5.4 °C (42 °F)	102.6	755.1 mm (30 in)
Sydney (capital)	Cfa	27.7 °C (82 °F)	20.0 °C (68 °F)	17.7 °C (64 °F)	8.6 °C (47 °F)	112.8	993.1 mm (39 in)
Wagga Wagga	Cfa	31.9 °C (89 °F)	16.5 °C (62 °F)	12.8 °C (55 °F)	2.0 °C (36 °F)	124.3	573.2 mm (23 in)
Wollongong	Cfb	25.6 °C (78 °F)	17.9 °C (64 °F)	17.0 °C (63 °F)	8.3 °C (47 °F)	107.4	1,323.7 mm (52 in)

=== Northern Territory ===
Köppen map of the Northern Territory

Place	Climate type	January mean max. temp	January mean min. temp	July mean max. temp	July mean min. temp	No. clear days	Annual precipitation
Alice Springs	BWh	37.1 °C (99 °F)	22.3 °C (72 °F)	20.7 °C (69 °F)	3.9 °C (39 °F)	191.5	275.0 mm (11 in)
Darwin	Aw	32.0 °C (90 °F)	25.1 °C (77 °F)	31.1 °C (88 °F)	19.3 °C (67 °F)	119.0	1,832.4 mm (72 in)
Katherine	Aw	34.6 °C (94 °F)	24.2 °C (76 °F)	30.4 °C (87 °F)	13.0 °C (55 °F)	140.8	1,076.8 mm (42 in)
Tennant Creek	BSh	36.8 °C (98 °F)	25.0 °C (77 °F)	24.7 °C (76 °F)	12.3 °C (54 °F)	181.0	478.6 mm (19 in)

The Northern Territory has two distinctive climate zones. The northern end, including Darwin, has a tropical savannah climate (Köppen Aw) with high humidity and two seasons, the wet (October to April) and dry season (May to September). During the dry season nearly every day is warm and sunny, and afternoon humidity averages around 30%. There is very little rainfall between May and September. In the coolest months of June and July, the daily minimum temperature may dip as low as 14 °C (57 °F), but very rarely lower, and frost has never been recorded.

The wet season is associated with tropical cyclones and monsoon rains. The majority of rainfall occurs between December and March (the Southern Hemisphere summer), when thunderstorms are common and afternoon relative humidity averages over 70% during the wettest months. On average more than 1,570 mm (62 in) of rain falls in the north. Thunderstorms can produce spectacular lightning displays.

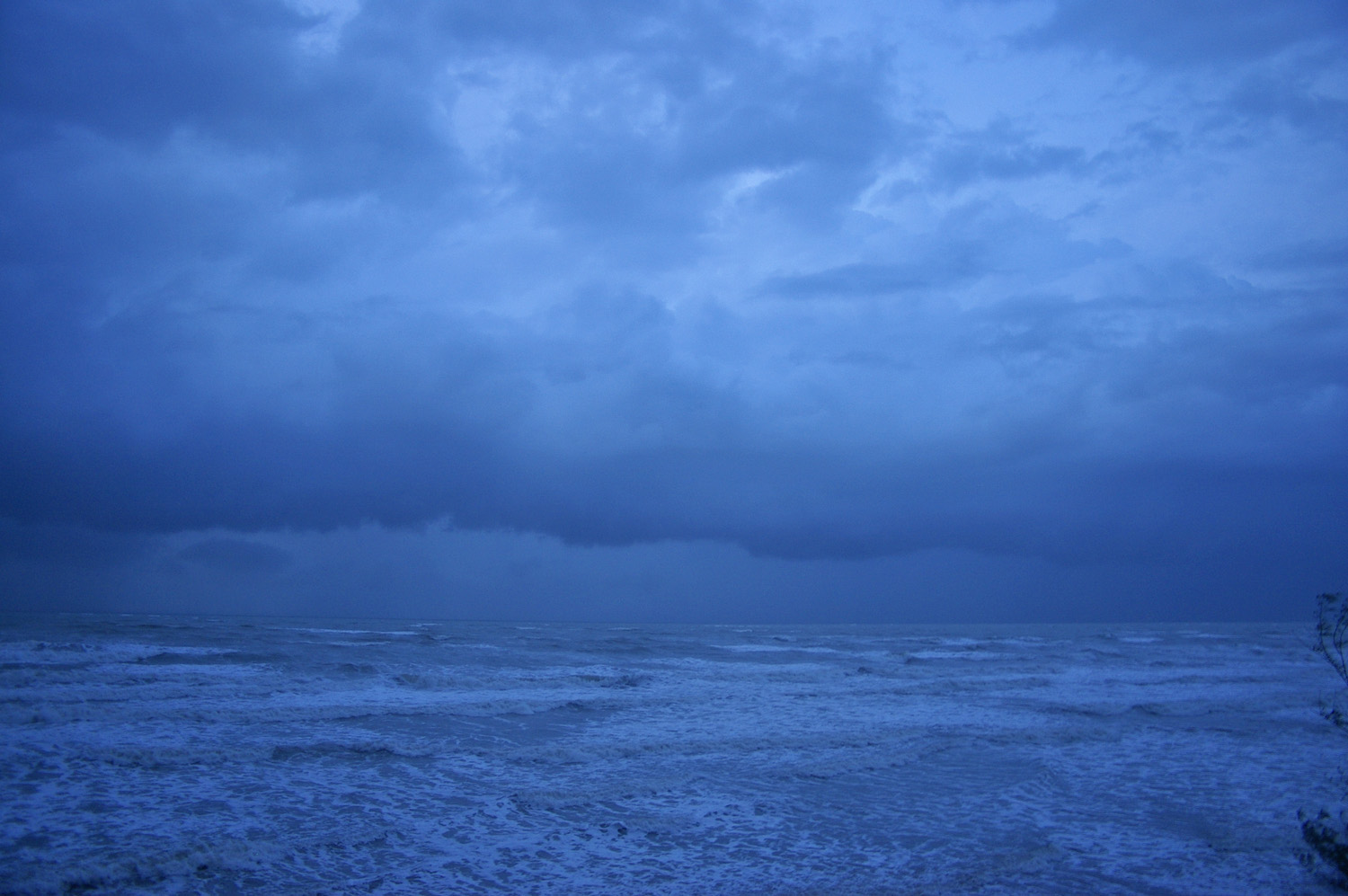
Monsoonal squall nears Darwin

The rest of the territory lies in the desert centre of the country; it includes Alice Springs and Uluru, and is arid or semi-arid with little rain usually falling during the hottest months from October to March. Its seasons are more defined than the northern parts, with summers being very hot, with average temperatures often exceeding 35 °C (95 °F), and winters relatively cool with average minimum temperatures dipping as low as 5 °C (41 °F), with a few frosty nights. Central Australia receives less than 250 mm (10 in) of annual rainfall.

The highest maximum temperature recorded in the territory was 48.3 °C (118.9 °F) at Finke on 1 and 2 January 1960. The lowest minimum temperature was −7.5 °C (18.5 °F) at Alice Springs on 17 July 1976.

=== Queensland ===
Köppen map of Queensland

Because of its size, there is significant variation in climate across the state. Low rainfall and hot summers are typical for the inland west, a monsoonal 'wet' season in the far north, and warm subtropical conditions along the coastal strip. Inland and in southern ranges cooler temperatures are experienced, especially at nights. The climate of the coastal strip is influenced by warm ocean waters, keeping the region free from extremes of temperature and providing moisture for rainfall.

There are five predominant climatic zones in Queensland, based on temperature and humidity:

- hot humid summer (far north and coastal)
- warm humid summer (coastal elevated hinterlands and coastal south-east)
- hot dry summer, mild winter (central west)
- hot dry summer, cold winter (southern west)
- temperate – warm summer, cold winter (inland south-east, e.g. Granite Belt)

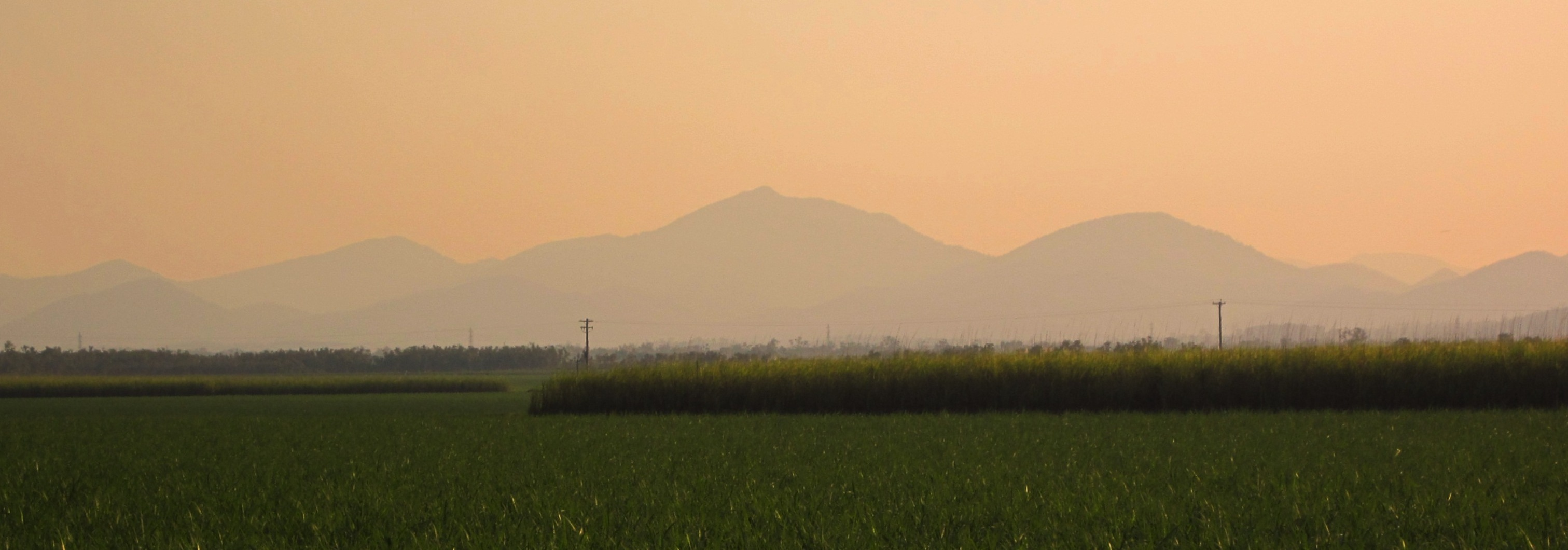
Grassland typical of Queensland and mountain ranges near Proserpine

However, most of the Queensland populace experience two weather seasons: a winter period of rather warm temperatures with minimal rainfall, and a sultry summer period of hot, sticky temperatures and more rain.

The highest maximum temperature observed in the state is 49.5 °C (121.1 °F) at Birdsville on 24 December 1972. The temperature of 53.1 °C (127.6 °F) at Cloncurry on 16 January 1889 is not considered official; the figure quoted from Birdsville is the next highest, so that record is considered as being official.

The lowest minimum temperature is −10.6 °C (12.9 °F) at Stanthorpe on 23 June 1961 and at The Hermitage on 12 July 1965.

Labelled map of Queensland showing where the places mentioned in the table are located

Place	Climate type	January max. temp	January min. temp	July max. Temp	July min. temp	No. clear days	Annual precipitation
Birdsville	BWh	40.7 °C (105 °F)	26.7 °C (80 °F)	21.9 °C (71 °F)	7.2 °C (45 °F)	220.9	163.0 mm (6 in)
Brisbane (capital)	Cfa	30.4 °C (87 °F)	21.6 °C (71 °F)	22.0 °C (72 °F)	10.5 °C (51 °F)	133.4	1,073.7 mm (42 in)
Cairns	Am	31.7 °C (89 °F)	24.0 °C (75 °F)	26.2 °C (79 °F)	17.2 °C (63 °F)	97.0	1,958.1 mm (77 in)
Gold Coast	Cfa	28.9 °C (84 °F)	21.9 °C (71 °F)	21.3 °C (70 °F)	12.0 °C (54 °F)	111.0	1,254.7 mm (49 in)
Mackay	Cwa	30.5 °C (87 °F)	23.1 °C (74 °F)	22.8 °C (73 °F)	11.4 °C (53 °F)	110.0	1,556.4 mm (61 in)
Mount Isa	BSh	36.7 °C (98 °F)	23.9 °C (75 °F)	24.9 °C (77 °F)	8.7 °C (48 °F)	175.4	469.7 mm (18 in)
Rockhampton	Cfa/BSh	32.6 °C (91 °F)	22.7 °C (73 °F)	23.9 °C (75 °F)	10.6 °C (51 °F)	125.0	715.7 mm (28 in)
Stanthorpe	Cfa/Cfb	27.9 °C (82 °F)	16.1 °C (61 °F)	15.6 °C (60 °F)	1.6 °C (35 °F)	82.2	712.4 mm (28 in)
Toowoomba	Cfa	28.4 °C (83 °F)	17.7 °C (64 °F)	16.7 °C (62 °F)	6.6 °C (44 °F)	107.2	738.8 mm (29 in)
Townsville	Aw	31.9 °C (89 °F)	24.7 °C (76 °F)	25.7 °C (78 °F)	14.0 °C (57 °F)	112.4	1,095.3 mm (43 in)
Weipa	Aw	32.0 °C (90 °F)	24.3 °C (76 °F)	31.1 °C (88 °F)	19.1 °C (66 °F)	54.1	1,979.3 mm (78 in)

=== South Australia ===
Köppen map of South Australia

The majority of the state has the arid and semi-arid climates. The southern coastal parts of the state have a Mediterranean climate with mild wet winters and hot dry summers. The highest rainfall occurs along the southern coasts and the Mount Lofty Ranges (with an average annual rainfall of 1,200 millimetres (47 in) in the vicinity of Mount Lofty); the lowest rainfall occurs in the Lake Eyre basin where the average annual totals are less than 150 millimetres (6 in) and possibly even 100 millimetres (4 in). Most of the rain in the southern districts of the State fall during the winter months when the sub-tropical high-pressure belt is displaced to the north over the Australian continent.

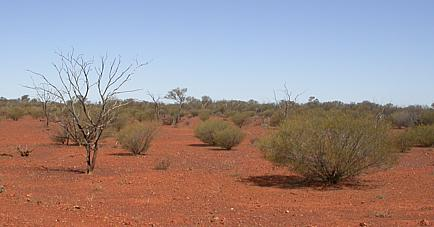
Typical desert landscape north of Coober Pedy

South Australia's mean temperature range is 29 °C (84 °F) in January and 15 °C (59 °F) in July. Daily temperatures in parts of the state in January and February can be up to 50 °C (122 °F). The highest maximum temperature was recorded as 50.7 °C (123.3 °F) at Oodnadatta on 2 January 1960, which is the highest official temperature recorded in Australia. The lowest minimum temperature was −8.0 °C (17.6 °F) at Yongala on 20 July 1976.

Labelled map of South Australia showing where the places mentioned in the table are located

Place	Climate type	January max. temp	January min. temp	July max. temp	July min. temp	No. clear days	Annual precipitation
Adelaide (capital)	Csa	29.6 °C (85 °F)	17.3 °C (63 °F)	15.4 °C (60 °F)	7.6 °C (46 °F)	87.5	540.6 mm (21 in)
Kingscote	Csb	26.8 °C (80 °F)	13.4 °C (56 °F)	15.4 °C (60 °F)	6.0 °C (43 °F)	62.1	434.4 mm (17 in)
Mount Gambier	Csb	25.5 °C (78 °F)	11.4 °C (53 °F)	13.2 °C (56 °F)	5.2 °C (41 °F)	40.5	711.2 mm (28 in)
Oodnadatta	BWh	38.1 °C (101 °F)	23.2 °C (74 °F)	19.8 °C (68 °F)	5.9 °C (43 °F)	182.5	171.8 mm (7 in)
Port Augusta	BWh	34.1 °C (93 °F)	19.5 °C (67 °F)	18.0 °C (64 °F)	4.7 °C (40 °F)	142.1	217.8 mm (9 in)
Stirling	Csb/Cfb	24.9 °C (77 °F)	12.4 °C (54 °F)	10.8 °C (51 °F)	5.1 °C (41 °F)	70.6	1,112.1 mm (44 in)
Whyalla	BSh	30.2 °C (86 °F)	17.9 °C (64 °F)	17.1 °C (63 °F)	5.3 °C (42 °F)	62.7	266.9 mm (11 in)

=== Tasmania ===
Köppen-Geiger climate types of Tasmania

Tasmania has a cool temperate climate, with most areas under an oceanic climate (Cfb), with four distinct seasons. Summer lasts from December to February when the average maximum sea temperature is 21 °C (70 °F) and inland areas around Launceston reach 24 °C (75 °F). Other inland areas are much cooler; Liawenee, located on the Central Plateau, is one of the coldest places in Australia with February temperatures ranging between 4 and 17 °C (39 and 63 °F). Autumn lasts between March and May and experiences changeable weather, where summer weather patterns gradually take on the shape of winter patterns.

The highest recorded maximum temperature in Tasmania was 42.2 °C (108.0 °F) at Scamander on 30 January 2009, during the 2009 south-eastern Australia heat wave. Tasmania's lowest recorded minimum temperature was −14.2 °C (6.4 °F) on 7 August 2020, at Liawenee.

Map of Tasmania with the locations shown in the table labelled

Place	Climate type	January max. temp	January min. temp	July max. temp	July min. temp	No. clear days	Annual precipitation
Burnie	Cfb	21.1 °C (70 °F)	12.7 °C (55 °F)	12.8 °C (55 °F)	6.0 °C (43 °F)	51.7	947.3 mm (37 in)
Devonport	Cfb	21.8 °C (71 °F)	12.6 °C (55 °F)	12.9 °C (55 °F)	4.7 °C (40 °F)	56.1	764.0 mm (30 in)
Flinders Island	Cfb	22.3 °C (72 °F)	13.6 °C (56 °F)	13.4 °C (56 °F)	6.4 °C (44 °F)	47.4	727.6 mm (29 in)
Hobart (capital)	Cfb	22.7 °C (73 °F)	13.0 °C (55 °F)	12.6 °C (55 °F)	5.2 °C (41 °F)	43.9	565.3 mm (22 in)
King Island	Cfb / Csb	21.2 °C (70 °F)	12.6 °C (55 °F)	13.4 °C (56 °F)	7.7 °C (46 °F)	19.6	843.6 mm (33 in)
Launceston	Cfb / Csb	25.2 °C (77 °F)	11.1 °C (52 °F)	11.8 °C (53 °F)	2.1 °C (36 °F)	60.5	612.1 mm (24 in)
Liawenee	Csc	19.1 °C (66 °F)	5.6 °C (42 °F)	5.8 °C (42 °F)	−1.6 °C (29 °F)	22.4	934.6 mm (37 in)
Queenstown	Cfb	21.0 °C (70 °F)	8.3 °C (47 °F)	11.6 °C (53 °F)	2.4 °C (36 °F)	29.0	2,404.1 mm (95 in)
St Helens	Cfb	22.9 °C (73 °F)	13.5 °C (56 °F)	13.6 °C (56 °F)	4.9 °C (41 °F)	N/A	712.0 mm (28 in)
Strahan	Cfb	21.2 °C (70 °F)	11.0 °C (52 °F)	12.4 °C (54 °F)	5.4 °C (42 °F)	15.7	1,495.9 mm (59 in)

=== Victoria ===
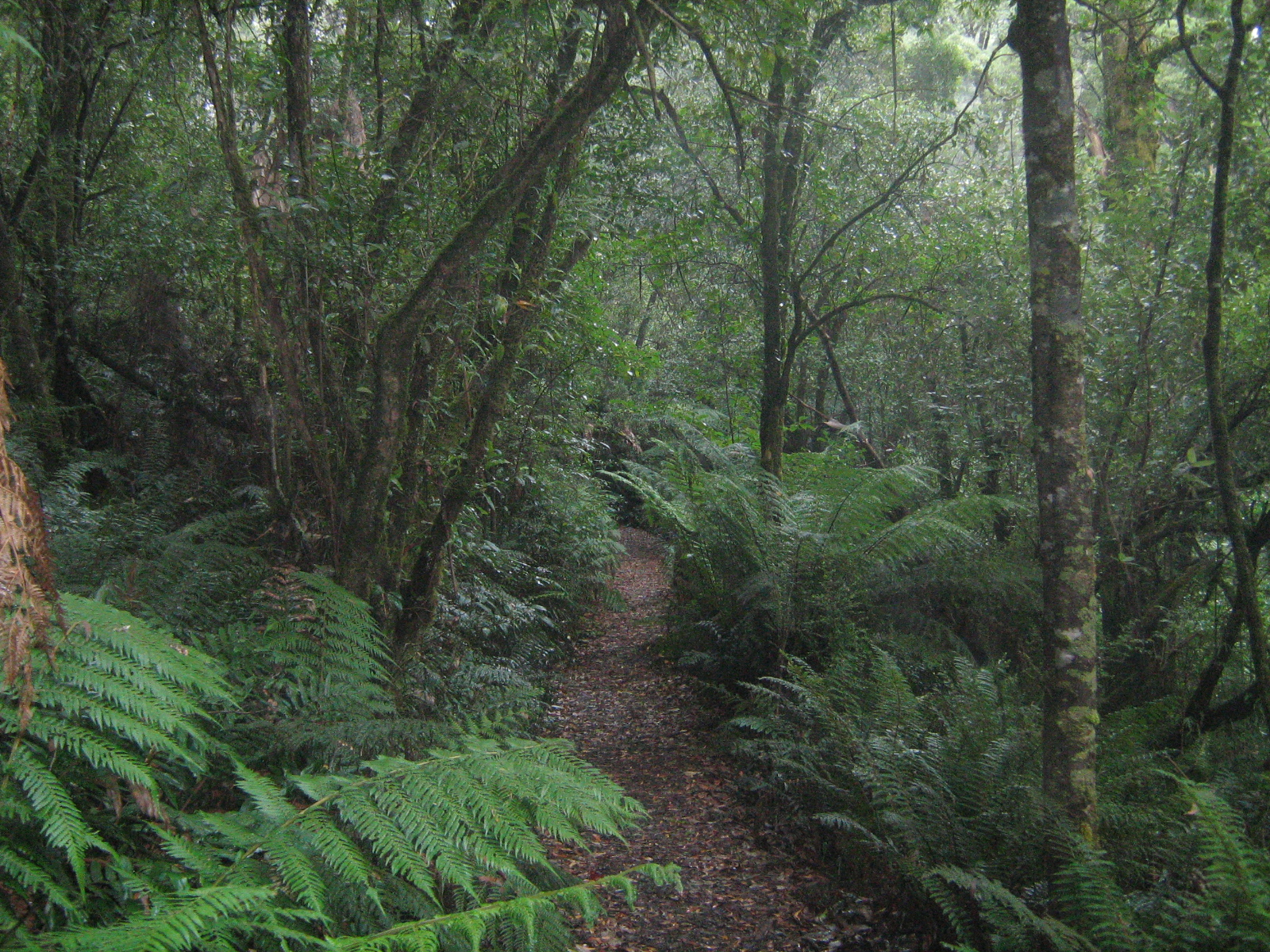
A temperate rainforest in Great Otway National Park, in the southwest region of the state

Victoria has a varied climate despite its small size. It ranges from semi-arid and hot in the north-west, to temperate and cool along the coast. Victoria's main land feature, the Great Dividing Range, produces a cooler, mountain climate in the centre and east of the state.

The coastal plain south of the Great Dividing Range has Victoria's mildest climate. Regular frontal systems off the Southern Ocean significantly mitigate the heat of summer. Melbourne and other large cities are located in this temperate region.

The Mallee and upper Wimmera are Victoria's warmest regions with hot winds blowing from nearby deserts. Average temperatures top 32 °C (90 °F) during summer and 15 °C (59 °F) in winter. Victoria's highest maximum temperature of 48.8 °C (119.8 °F) was recorded in Hopetoun on 7 February 2009, during the 2009 south-eastern Australia heat wave. A screen temperature of 50.7 °C (123.3 °F) was recorded on 7 January 1906 in Mildura.

The Victorian Alps in the eastern and central regions constitute the coldest climate of Victoria. The Alps are part of the Great Dividing Range extending longitudinally through the centre of Victoria. Average maximum temperatures are less than 9 °C (48 °F) in winter; below 0 °C (32 °F) in the highest parts of the ranges. The state's lowest minimum temperature of −11.7 °C (10.9 °F) was recorded at Omeo on 13 June 1965, and again at Falls Creek on 3 July 1970.

Victoria is the wettest Australian state after Tasmania. Rainfall in Victoria increases from north to south, with higher averages in areas of high altitude. Median annual rainfall exceeds 1,800 mm (71 in) in some parts of the Northeast but is less than 250 mm (10 in) in the Mallee.

Rain is heaviest in the Otway Ranges on the southwest coast and West Gippsland in south-central Victoria, and in the mountainous Northeast. Snow often falls on the low-lying hilly country in the centre of the state, and on rare occasions may also fall to sea level on the southernmost beaches. Rain falls most frequently in winter, but summer rainfall is heavier. Rainfall is most reliable in Gippsland and the Western District, making them both leading farming areas. Victoria's highest recorded daily rainfall was 375 millimetres (14.8 in) at Tanybryn in the Otway Ranges on 22 March 1983.

Labelled map showing the relative locations of the places mentioned in the table

Place	Climate type	January max. temp	January min. temp	July max. temp	July min. temp	No. clear days	Annual precipitation
Bairnsdale	Cfb	25.9 °C (79 °F)	13.2 °C (56 °F)	14.7 °C (58 °F)	4.0 °C (39 °F)	59.6	644.3 mm (25 in)
Ballarat	Cfb	25.3 °C (78 °F)	11.1 °C (52 °F)	10.1 °C (50 °F)	3.2 °C (38 °F)	55.2	683.1 mm (27 in)
Bendigo	Cfa/Cfb/BSk	30.4 °C (87 °F)	14.5 °C (58 °F)	12.7 °C (55 °F)	2.7 °C (37 °F)	109.9	515.2 mm (20 in)
Falls Creek	Cfb/Cfc/Dfb/Dfc	17.9 °C (64 °F)	8.9 °C (48 °F)	1.2 °C (34 °F)	−2.9 °C (27 °F)	53.0	1,370.2 mm (54 in)
Geelong	Cfb	24.5 °C (76 °F)	13.0 °C (55 °F)	13.9 °C (57 °F)	5.4 °C (42 °F)	37.6	525.2 mm (21 in)
Melbourne (capital)	Cfb	27.0 °C (81 °F)	14.2 °C (58 °F)	13.4 °C (56 °F)	5.8 °C (42 °F)	48.2	515.5 mm (20 in)
Mildura	BSk	32.6 °C (91 °F)	16.9 °C (62 °F)	15.5 °C (60 °F)	4.4 °C (40 °F)	132.0	285.1 mm (11 in)
Portland	Csb/Cfb	22.3 °C (72 °F)	12.5 °C (55 °F)	13.2 °C (56 °F)	6.3 °C (43 °F)	40.1	833.6 mm (33 in)
Shepparton	BSk	32.1 °C (90 °F)	15.6 °C (60 °F)	13.4 °C (56 °F)	3.4 °C (38 °F)	106.1	446.8 mm (18 in)
Warrnambool	Cfb/Csb	24.7 °C (76 °F)	12.1 °C (54 °F)	13.5 °C (56 °F)	5.5 °C (42 °F)	53.4	741.9 mm (29 in)

Temperature and precipitation for Victoria.
Source: BOM – Department of Primary Industries, Australian Natural Resources Atlas
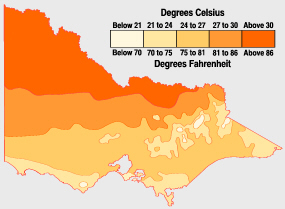
Average January temperatures: Victoria's north is always hotter than coastal and mountainous areas.

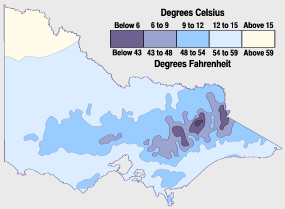
Average July temperatures: Victoria's hills and ranges are coolest during winter. Snow also falls there.

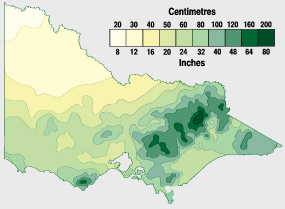
Average yearly precipitation: Victoria's rainfall is concentrated in the mountainous north-east and coast.

Köppen map of Victoria

=== Western Australia ===
Köppen map of Western Australia

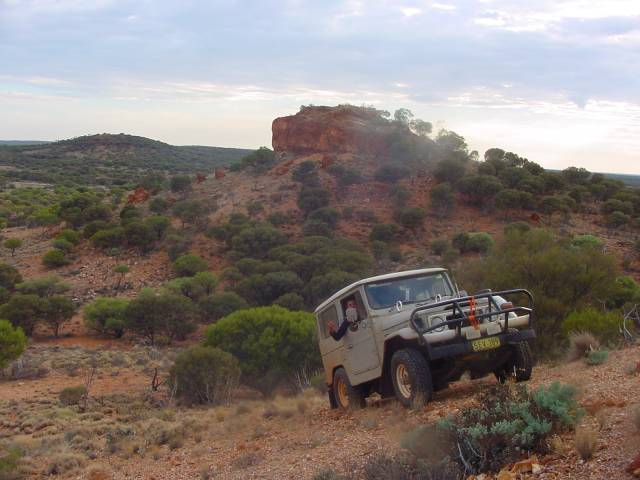
A four-wheel drive in the Gibson Desert

Most of Western Australia has a hot arid and semi-arid climate. However, the south-west corner of the state has a Mediterranean climate. The area was originally heavily forested, including large stands of the karri, one of the world's tallest trees. This agricultural region of Western Australia is in the top nine terrestrial habitats for terrestrial biodiversity, with a higher proportion of endemic species than most other equivalent regions. Due to the offshore Leeuwin Current, the area numbers in the top six regions for marine biodiversity, containing the most southerly coral reefs in the world.

Average annual rainfall varies from 300 mm (12 in) at the edge of the Wheatbelt region to 1,400 mm (55 in) in the wettest areas near Northcliffe, the southwesternmost tip of Australia, but in the months of November to March, although rain still falls, evaporation exceeds rainfall and it is generally very dry. Plants must be adapted to this as well as the extreme poverty of all soils. A major reduction in rainfall has been observed, with a greater number of rainfall events in the summer months. The central four-fifths of the state is semi-arid or desert and is lightly inhabited with the only significant activity being mining. Annual rainfall averages about 200 to 250 mm (8 to 10 in), most of which occurs in sporadic torrential falls related to cyclone events in summer months.

An exception to this is the northern tropical regions. The Kimberley has an extremely hot monsoonal climate with average annual rainfall ranging from 500 to 1,500 mm (20 to 59 in), but there is a very long dry season of 7 months from April to November. Eighty-five per cent of the state's runoff occurs in the Kimberley, but because it occurs in violent floods and because of the insurmountable poverty of the generally shallow soils, development has only taken place along the Ord River.

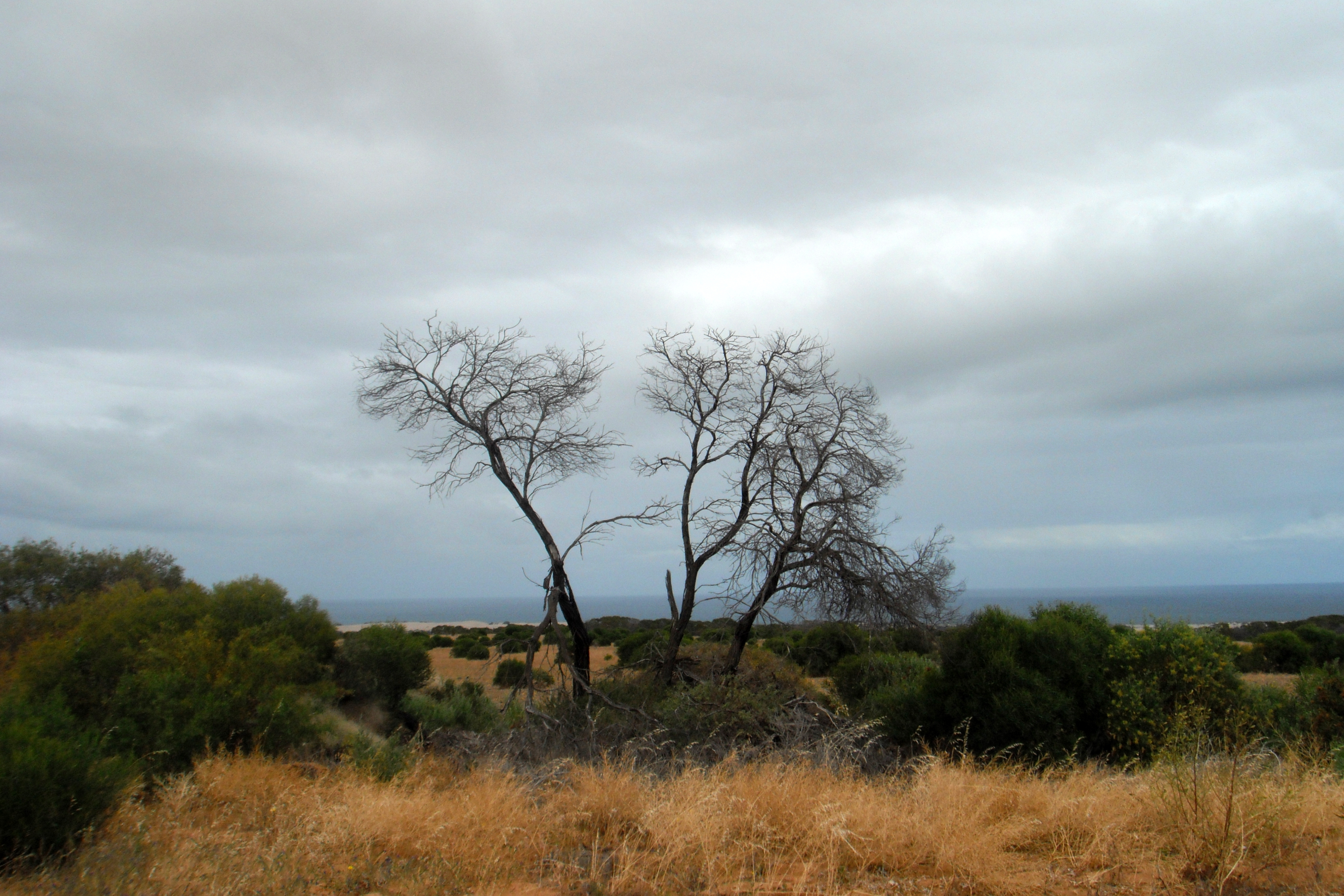
A chaparral-like bush land in the Mediterranean region of the state

Australia's tropical/subtropical location and cold waters off the western coast make most of Western Australia a hot desert with aridity a marked feature of a greater part of the continent. These cold waters produce precious little moisture needed on the mainland. A 2005 study by Australian and American researchers investigated the desertification of the interior, and suggested that one explanation was related to human settlers who arrived about 50,000 years ago.

Snowfall in the state is rare, and typically only in the Stirling Range near Albany, the southwesternmost point in WA, the only mountain range far enough south and with sufficient elevation. More rarely, snow can fall on the nearby Porongurup Range. Snow outside these areas is a major event; it usually occurs in hilly areas of south-western Australia. The most widespread low-level snow occurred on 26 June 1956 when snow was reported in the Perth Hills, as far north as Wongan Hills and as far east as Salmon Gums. However, even in the Stirling Range, snowfalls rarely exceed 5 cm (2 in) and rarely settle for more than one day.

The highest observed maximum temperature of 50.7 °C (123.3 °F) was recorded at Onslow on 13 January 2022. The lowest minimum temperature recorded was −7.2 °C (19.0 °F) at Eyre Bird Observatory on 17 August 2008.

Map of Western Australia with the places listed in the table labelled

Place	Climate type	January max. temp	January min. temp	July max. temp	July min. temp	No. clear days	Annual precipitation
Albany	Csb	22.8 °C (73 °F)	15.3 °C (60 °F)	15.9 °C (61 °F)	8.3 °C (47 °F)	44.8	921.1 mm (36 in)
Broome	BSh	33.4 °C (92 °F)	26.4 °C (80 °F)	29.0 °C (84 °F)	13.7 °C (57 °F)	182.3	631.2 mm (25 in)
Eucla	BSk/BSh	26.0 °C (79 °F)	16.8 °C (62 °F)	18.1 °C (65 °F)	7.2 °C (45 °F)	94.4	274.7 mm (11 in)
Geraldton	Csa/BSh	31.7 °C (89 °F)	18.3 °C (65 °F)	19.6 °C (67 °F)	9.4 °C (49 °F)	164.2	442.9 mm (17 in)
Kalgoorlie	BSh	33.7 °C (93 °F)	18.4 °C (65 °F)	16.9 °C (62 °F)	5.1 °C (41 °F)	151.1	265.5 mm (10 in)
Karratha	BWh	36.0 °C (97 °F)	27.0 °C (81 °F)	26.5 °C (80 °F)	13.8 °C (57 °F)	208.0	290.9 mm (11 in)
Perth (capital)	Csa	31.4 °C (89 °F)	18.2 °C (65 °F)	18.5 °C (65 °F)	8.1 °C (47 °F)	130.9	744.8 mm (29 in)
Wyndham	BSh/Aw	36.9 °C (98 °F)	26.3 °C (79 °F)	31.0 °C (88 °F)	16.9 °C (62 °F)	175.5	850.0 mm (33 in)

=== Distant Australian islands ===
Island(s)	Climate type	Coordinates	January max. temp	January min. temp	July max. temp	July min. temp	No. clear days	Annual precipitation
Christmas Island	Am	10.45°S 105.69°E	28.1 °C (83 °F)	22.8 °C (73 °F)	26.3 °C (79 °F)	22.6 °C (73 °F)	7.9	2,194.7 mm (86 in)
Cocos (Keeling) Islands	Af	12.19°S 96.83°E	29.8 °C (86 °F)	24.9 °C (77 °F)	28.1 °C (83 °F)	24.1 °C (75 °F)	N/A	1,960.0 mm (77 in)
Lord Howe Island	Cfa	31.54°S 159.08°E	25.5 °C (78 °F)	20.8 °C (69 °F)	19.1 °C (66 °F)	14.0 °C (57 °F)	67.8	1,474.1 mm (58 in)
Macquarie Island	ET	54.50°S 158.94°E	8.8 °C (48 °F)	5.3 °C (42 °F)	5.0 °C (41 °F)	1.7 °C (35 °F)	3.5	1,005.2 mm (40 in)
Norfolk Island	Cfa	29.04°S 167.94°E	24.6 °C (76 °F)	19.2 °C (67 °F)	18.5 °C (65 °F)	13.7 °C (57 °F)	41.0	1,280.5 mm (50 in)
Willis Island	Aw	16.29°S 149.97°E	30.8 °C (87 °F)	25.8 °C (78 °F)	26.1 °C (79 °F)	22.1 °C (72 °F)	67.4	1,099.2 mm (43 in)

== Precipitation ==
Australia sits south of the equator and under a strong, migrating zone of high-pressure called the subtropical ridge; this can lead to some interesting cloud cover. Using an advanced supercomputer climate model called GEOS-5, NASA scientists recreated 19 days of changing cloud cover over Australia. Watch the visualisation to explore the movement of different systems that formed across the continent. Look for rising cumulus clouds that appear to bubble up over land each day.

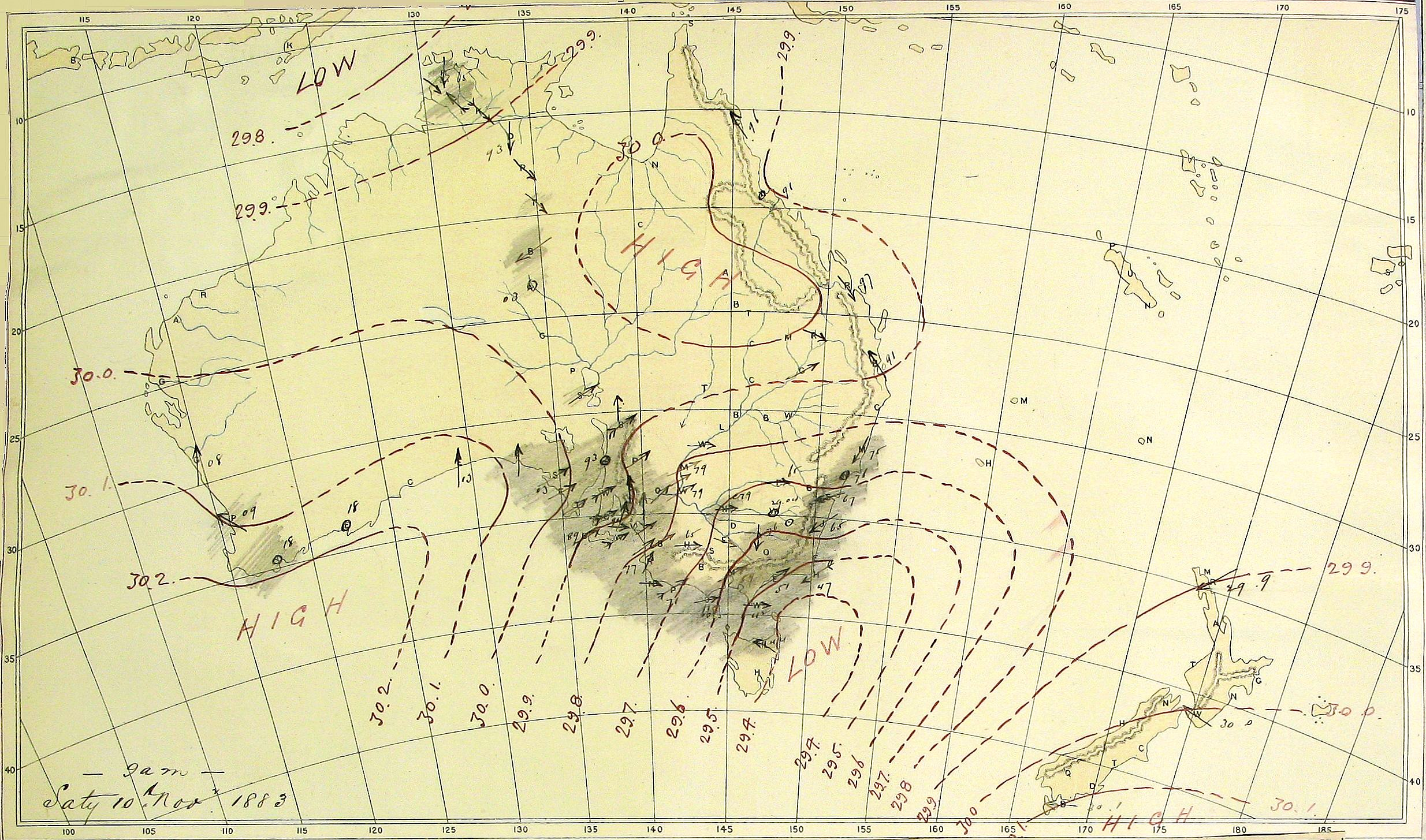
When the Roaring forties contract towards southeastern Australia, they would usually bring rainfall and as well as snow in the southeast, particularly around the Australian Alps.

123 years of rainfall in Australia (1900–2022), report by Bureau of Meteorology.

=== Rain ===
More than 80% of Australia has an annual rainfall of less than 600 mm (24 in); among the continents, only Antarctica receives less rainfall. A place inland near Lake Eyre (in South Australia) would only receive 81 mm (3 in) of rain annually. Another place, Troudaninna Bore (29°11′44″S 138°59′28″E, altitude : 46 m) in South Australia, from 1893 to 1936, received, in average, 104.9 mm (4.13 inches) of precipitation. From one extreme to another, parts of the far North Queensland coast annually average over 4,000 mm (157 in), with the Australian annual record being 12,461 mm (491 in), set at the summit of Mount Bellenden Ker in 2000. Four factors contribute to the dryness of the Australian landmass:

- Cold ocean currents off the west coast
- Low elevation of landforms
- Dominance of high-pressure systems
- Shape of the landmass

The average annual rainfall in the Australian desert is low, ranging from 81 to 250 mm (3 to 10 in). Thunderstorms are relatively common in the region, with an annual average of 15 to 20 thunderstorms. Summer daytime temperatures range from 32 to 40 °C (90 to 104 °F); winter temperatures run 18 to 23 °C (64 to 73 °F).

The southern parts of Australia get the usual westerly winds and rain-bearing cold fronts that come when high–pressure systems move towards northern Australia during winter. Cold snaps may bring frosts inland, though temperatures near the coast are mild or near mild all year round. The Australian northwest cloudbands provides up to 80% of the annual rainfall for northwestern Australia and up to 40% of the annual rainfall for southwestern Australia, including most of the winter rainfall over northwest Western Australia and Central Australia. Summers in southern Australia are generally dry and hot with coastal sea breezes. During a lengthy dry spell, hot and dry winds from the interior can cause bushfires in some southern and eastern states, though most commonly Victoria and New South Wales.

The tropical areas of northern Australia have a wet summer because of the monsoon. During "the wet", typically October to April, humid north-westerly winds bring showers and thunderstorms. Occasionally, tropical cyclones can bring heavy rainfall to tropical coastal regions, which is also likely to reach further inland. After the monsoonal season, the dry season comes ("winter"), which brings mostly clear skies and milder conditions.

Rainfall records tend to be concentrated along the east coast of Australia, particularly in tropical north Queensland. The highest 24‑hour rainfall on record in Australia was 907.0 millimetres (35.7 in) in Crohamhurst on 3 February 1893. The highest monthly rainfall on record was 5,387.0 millimetres (212.1 in) recorded at Mount Bellenden Ker, Queensland in January 1979. The highest annual rainfall was 12,461.0 millimetres (490.6 in) recorded also at Mount Bellenden Ker in 2000. Additionally, the location which receives the highest average annual rainfall in Australia is Babinda in Queensland with an annual average of 4,279.4 millimetres (168.5 in).

Cold ocean currents off the coast of Western Australia result in little evaporation occurring. Hence, rain clouds are sparsely formed and rarely do they form long enough for a continuous period of rain to be recorded. Australia's arid/semi-arid zone extends to this region. The absence of any significant mountain range or area of substantial height above sea level, results in very little rainfall caused by orographic uplift. In the east the Great Dividing Range limits rain moving into inland Australia.

Australia has a compact shape, and no significant bodies of water penetrate very far inland. This is important in as much as moist winds are prevented from penetrating inland, so keeping rainfall low.

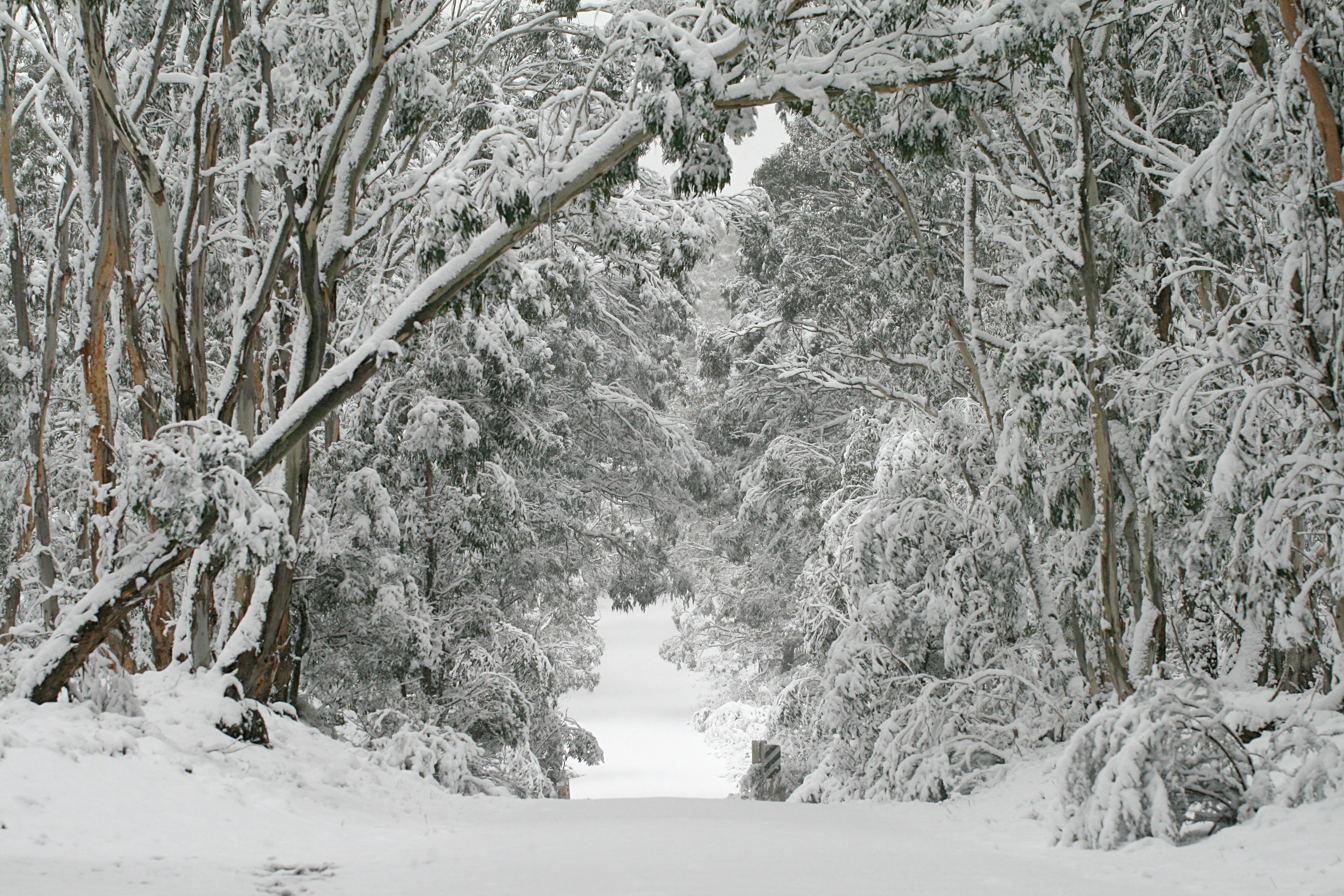
Kanangra-Boyd National Park in the Blue Mountains

=== Snow ===
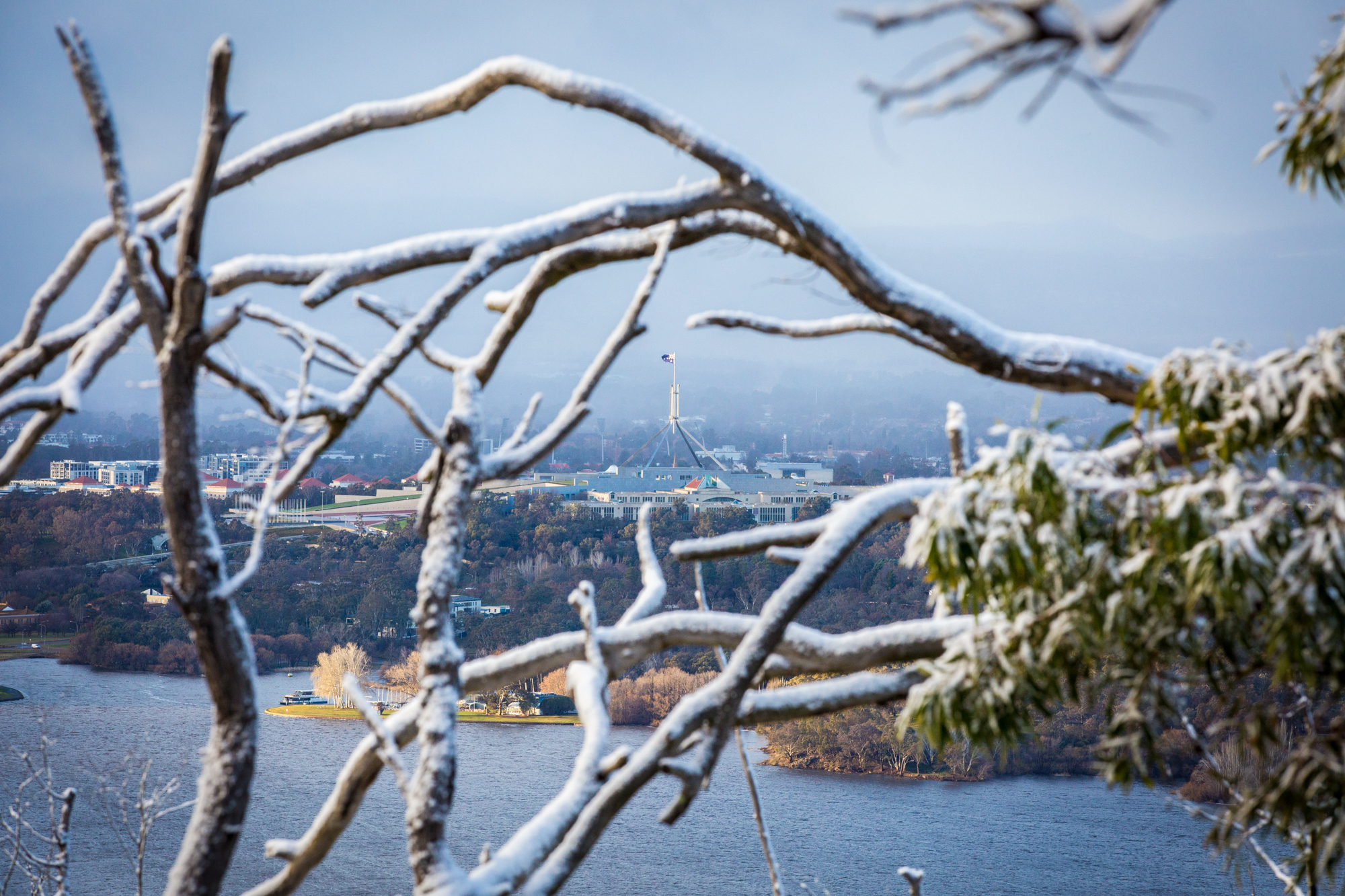
Snow in Canberra, July 2016.

In Australia, snow falls frequently on the highlands of the southeast. There is a regular snow season in several areas which have seasonal skiing industries, such as Thredbo, Cabramurra, Perisher, Mount Hotham and Mount Buller, among others. Snow falls with some regularity above 600 metres (2,000 ft) on the Great Dividing Range, seldom as far north as Stanthorpe in southernmost Queensland and in isolated parts of South Australia and Western Australia.

Snow at sea level is rarely recorded on mainland Australia (namely in southern Victoria), but is much more frequent in south-western Tasmania. Light snow generally falls once every few winters in the nation's capital Canberra. Furthermore, the major regional cities of Orange and Ballarat receive snowfalls on an annual basis, with populations of over 40,000 and 100,000 respectively. Snow has been recorded in every state and territory, though among the state capitals only Canberra, Hobart and Melbourne have recorded snow.

== Temperatures ==
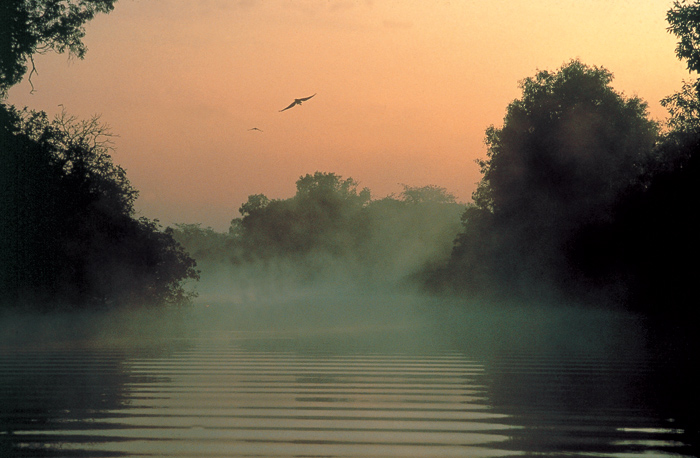
A billabong in the Kakadu National Park, Northern Territory. The monsoon climate of northern Australia is hot and humid in summer.

The tropical savannah zone of Northern Australia is warm to hot all year. Summers are hot in most of the country with average January maximum temperatures exceeding 30 °C over most of the mainland, except for high elevations. Winters are warm in the north and cool in the south, with nightly frosts common in inland areas south of the Tropic of Capricorn. Only at the highly elevated areas do wintertime temperatures approach those found in much of Europe or North America, especially the southern parts.

Temperatures in Australia have followed an increasing trend between the years of 1910 and 2004 by approximately 0.7 °C. Overnight minimum temperatures have warmed more rapidly than daytime maximum temperatures. The observed warming has hastened in recent years. The late-20th-century warming has been largely attributed to the increased greenhouse effect. Temperature differences between winter and summer are minor in the tropical region of Australia. However, they are greatest in the southern inland, with seasonal differences along the coast being moderated by the ocean's proximity. In July, a more common latitudinal distribution of average maximums is apparent, ranging from 30 °C near the north coast to below 3 °C in the mountainous areas of the south-east.

Average minimum temperatures in all seasons are highest in northern Australia and near the coastal areas, and are lowest in the elevated areas of the south-east. The highest average January minimum temperatures (near 27 °C) are found near the north-west coast, while in winter they exceed 20 °C at some coastal locations in northern Australia and on the Torres Strait and Tiwi Islands. In the mountains of New South Wales, it is not unusual to have average low minimum temperatures dipping below 5 °C in January and −5 °C in July. Comparatively, most inland (non-mountainous) areas south of the tropics have average July minimum between 0 and 6 °C.

In the desert, the dry air and clear skies give rather large ranges in temperature between day and night. Ranges of 15 °C being typical and 20 °C not quite unusual. Light nighttime frosts in winter occur over much of the southern half of the arid zone, where mean July minimum temperatures are mostly in the 3 to 6 °C range. Moving north, frosts become increasingly rare, with mean July minimum being around 10 °C on the northern boundary.

The highest maximums in Australia are recorded in two regions, the Pilbara and Gascoyne regions of north-western Western Australia and the area extending from south-western Queensland across South Australia into south-eastern Western Australia. Many locations in this region have recorded temperatures exceeding 48 °C. In January, average maximum temperatures exceed 35 °C over a large area of the interior and exceed 40 °C over areas in the north-west. The highest summer maximums in the Pilbara and Gascoyne average at around 41 °C (in some years daily maximums consecutively exceed 40 °C for several weeks at a time).

=== Extremes ===
Spring snowfall in Ballarat, September 2020. Temperatures hovered around freezing across the middle of the day in the city, allowing snow to settle on the ground. This is a rare event in Ballarat.

The most powerful heatwave in the history of south-eastern Australia occurred in January 1939. Adelaide (46.1 °C on the 12th), Melbourne (45.6 °C on the 13th) and Sydney (45.3 °C on the 14th) all had record-high temperatures during this period, as did many other central district areas in New South Wales, Victoria and South Australia. Each city's record would later be broken, with Adelaide's 46.6 °C (115.9 °F) on 24 January 2019, Melbourne's 46.4 °C (115.5 °F) on 7 February 2009 and Sydney's 45.8 °C (114.4 °F) on 18 January 2013.

The record number of consecutive days in Melbourne over 40 °C is five, with Brisbane having two and Sydney having three. Heatwaves usually bring oppressively warm nights, with Oodnadatta, SA recording an Australian record of nine nights above 30 °C in February 2004. Another extreme event was a prolonged period of extensive heatwaves known as the Angry Summer in early 2013.

Marble Bar achieved 160 consecutive days above 37.8 °C (100.0 °F) in 1923–24. Nyang had an average maximum of 44.8 °C for the months of February 1998 and January 2005, an Australian record. At the other extreme, average January maximums are near 15 °C on the highest peaks of the south-east ranges and near 20 °C in much of Tasmania. In most of the desert region during summer, cool days are rare and usually associated with major rain events—a rather exceptional example occurred in February 1949, when many areas failed to reach 20 °C on one or more days, and the maximum at Boulia, western Queensland was at 14.4 °C, which was 23 °C below normal.

Many other locations in Australia, except those above 500 metres, have extreme maximums between 43 and 48 °C. Most Tasmanian sites away from the north coast have had extreme maximums between 35 and 40 °C. The lowest extreme maximums are found along the north coast of Tasmania (e.g. 29.5 °C at Low Head) and at high elevations (27.0 °C at Thredbo). While extreme high temperatures are more common inland than they are near the coast, notable extreme maxima have been observed near the coast; 50.7 °C at Onslow, 50.5 °C at Mardie, 50.0 °C at Port Augusta, South Australia, 49.9 °C at Nullarbor, South Australia and 49.8 °C at Eucla, South Australia.

At lower elevations, most inland places south of the tropics have extreme minimum between −3 and −7 °C, and these low temperatures have also occurred in locations within a few kilometres of southern and eastern coasts, such as Sale, Victoria (−5.6 °C), Bega, New South Wales (−8.1 °C), Grove, Tasmania (−7.5 °C) and Taree, New South Wales (−5.0 °C). Many locations in this region have recorded −10 °C or lower, including Gudgenby in the Australian Capital Territory (−14.6 °C) and Woolbrook, New South Wales (−14.5 °C). In the desert, the lowest extreme minimum occur at high elevations, especially around Alice Springs, where the temperature has fallen as low as −7.5 °C.

In the tropics, extreme minimum near or below 0 °C have occurred at many places distant from the coast, as far north as Herberton, Queensland (−5.0 °C). Some locations near tropical coasts, such as Mackay (−0.8 °C), Townsville (0.1 °C) and Kalumburu, Western Australia (0.3 °C) have also recorded temperatures near 0 °C. In contrast, some coastal locations, such as Darwin, have never fallen below 10 °C, and Thursday Island, in the Torres Strait, has an extreme minimum of 16.1 °C. The lowest maximum temperature on record in Australia was −6.9 °C (19.6 °F), recorded on 9 July 1978 at Thredbo Ski Resort in New South Wales. The highest minimum temperature on record was 36.6 °C (97.9 °F) on 26 January 2019 at Borrona Downs Station near Wanaaring, New South Wales. Before this heatwave, the previous record was 35.5 °C (95.9 °F), recorded on 24 January 1982 in Arkaroola, South Australia and again on 21 January 2003 in Wittenoom, Western Australia.

A list of extremes can be found in the tables below:

Absolute temperature ranges
Month	Maximum temperatures			Minimum temperatures		
Month	°C	°F	location and date	°C	°F	location and date
January	50.7	123.3	Oodnadatta, South Australia (2 January 1960); Onslow, Western Australia (13 January 2022)	−7.7	18.1	Thredbo Ski Resort, New South Wales (24 January 2000)
February	50.5	122.9	Mardie, Western Australia (19 February 1998)	−7.0	19.4	Perisher Ski Resort, New South Wales (17 February 1979)
March	48.5	119.3	Emu Creek Station, Western Australia (11 March 2019)	−7.2	19.0	Kiandra, New South Wales (25 March 1964)/Bullocks Flat, New South Wales (31 March 1988)
April	45.0	113.0	Port Hedland, Western Australia (1 April 1948)/Marble Bar, Western Australia (2 April 1928)	−13.0	8.6	Charlotte Pass, New South Wales (29 April 2009)
May	40.6	105.1	Bidyadanga, Western Australia (6 May 1990)	−13.4	7.9	Charlotte Pass, New South Wales (24 May 2008)
June	37.9	100.2	Bradshaw Station, Northern Territory (7 June 2016)	−23.0	−9.4	Charlotte Pass, New South Wales (29 June 1994)
July	38.3	100.9	Kalumburu, Western Australia (24 July 2016)	−19.6	−3.3	Charlotte Pass, New South Wales (20 July 2010)
August	41.6	106.9	Yampi Sound, Western Australia (26 August 2024)	−20.6	−5.1	Charlotte Pass, New South Wales (14 August 1968)
September	43.1	109.6	West Roebuck, Western Australia (27 September 2003)	−16.7	1.9	Charlotte Pass, New South Wales (20 September 1967)
October	46.9	116.4	Port Hedland, Western Australia (22 October 2002)	−12.0	10.4	Charlotte Pass, New South Wales (29 October 2006)
November	48.7	119.7	Birdsville, Queensland (17 November 1990)	−9.4	15.1	Charlotte Pass, New South Wales (26 November 1968)
December	49.9	121.8	Nullarbor, South Australia (19 December 2019)	−9.0	15.8	Thredbo Ski Resort, New South Wales (13 December 1976)

Climate data for Australia
Month	Jan	Feb	Mar	Apr	May	Jun	Jul	Aug	Sep	Oct	Nov	Dec	Year
Record high °C (°F)	50.7 (123.3)	50.5 (122.9)	48.5 (119.3)	45.0 (113.0)	40.6 (105.1)	37.9 (100.2)	38.3 (100.9)	41.6 (106.9)	43.1 (109.6)	46.9 (116.4)	48.7 (119.7)	49.9 (121.8)	50.7 (123.3)
Record low °C (°F)	−7.7 (18.1)	−7.0 (19.4)	−7.2 (19.0)	−13.0 (8.6)	−13.4 (7.9)	−23.0 (−9.4)	−19.6 (−3.3)	−20.6 (−5.1)	−16.7 (1.9)	−12.0 (10.4)	−9.4 (15.1)	−9.0 (15.8)	−23.0 (−9.4)
Source: Bureau of Meteorology, Australian Government

== Natural hazards and disasters ==
=== Bushfires ===
Climatic factors contribute to Australia's high incidence of bushfires, particularly during the summer months. Low relative humidity, wind and lack of rain can cause a small fire, either man-made or caused by lightning strikes, to spread rapidly. Low humidity, the heat of the sun and lack of water cause vegetation to dry out becoming a perfect fuel for the fire. High winds fan the flames, increasing their intensity and the speed and distance at which they can travel.

Many of the worst bushfires in eastern Australia, such as the 1983 Ash Wednesday fires, accompany El Niño–Southern Oscillation events which tend to cause a warm, dry and windy climate.

The worst bushfires in Australian history occurred during the 2019–2020 Australian bushfire season, also known as the "Black Summer", which lasted for 6 months and burnt 140,000 km^{2} (55,000 mi^{2}) of land primarily in New South Wales, Victoria, Queensland and the Australian Capital Territory. By the end of the season there had been 14-34 direct human deaths, hundreds of indirect human deaths, 1-3 billion animal deaths and 3,500 homes destroyed.

Prior to this, the worst had been the Black Saturday fires in February to March 2009, causing 173 deaths and destroying over 2000 homes in Victoria.

=== Dust storms ===
A dust storm or sandstorm, a meteorological phenomenon common in arid and semi-arid regions, arises when a gust front passes or when the wind force exceeds the threshold value where loose sand and dust are removed from the dry surface. Particles are transported by saltation and suspension, causing soil erosion from one place and deposition in another.

Sandstorm usually refers to dust storms in desert areas when, in addition to fine particles obscuring visibility, a considerable amount of larger sand particles moves closer to the surface. The term dust storm is more likely to be used when finer particles are blown long distances, especially when the dust storm affects urban areas.

=== Drought ===
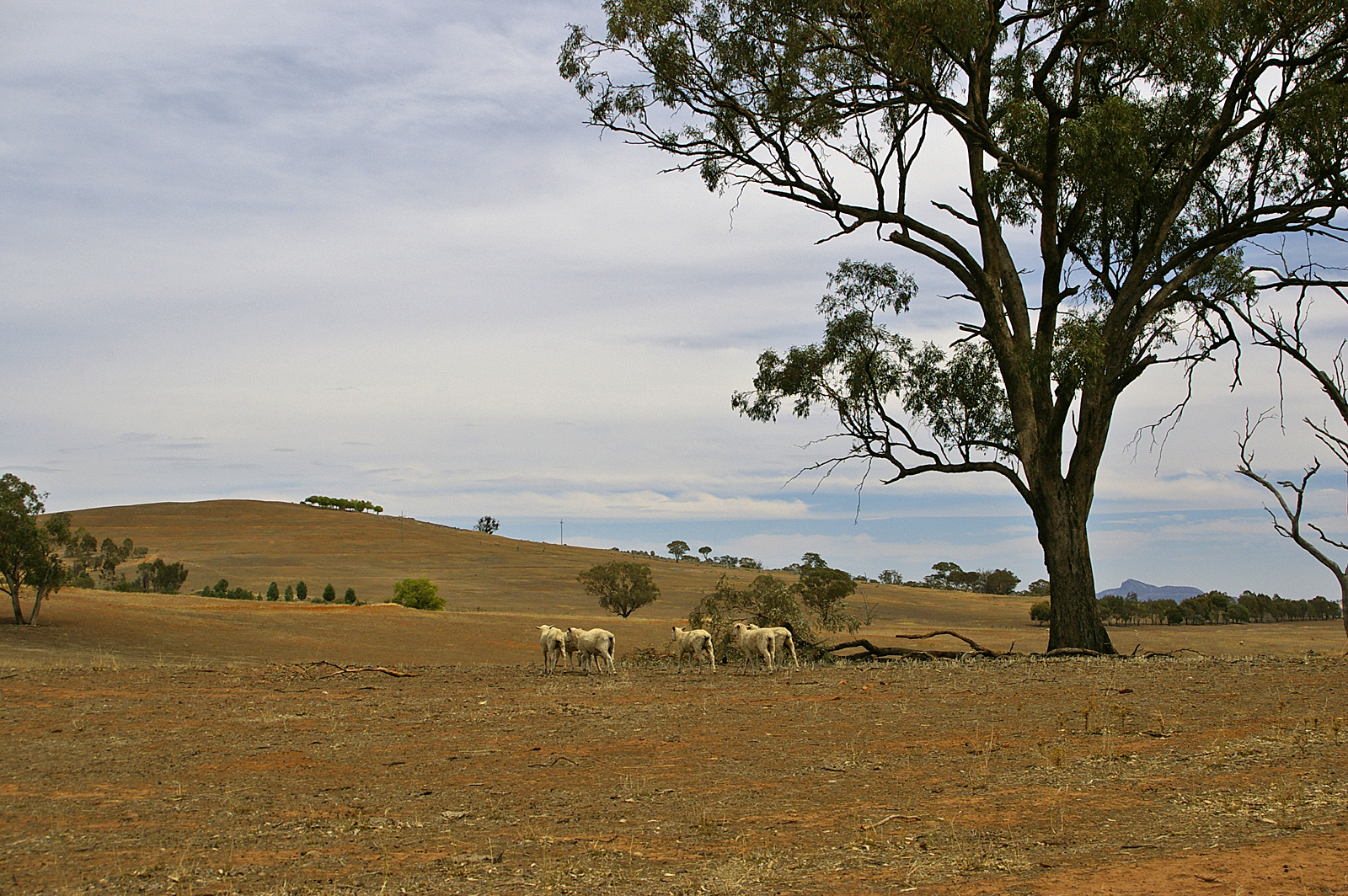
Drought-affected paddock in the New South Wales farming region of the Riverina

Drought in Australia is defined by rainfall over a three-month period being in the lowest ten per cent of amounts having been recorded for that region in the past. This definition takes into account that low rainfall is a relative term and rainfall deficiencies need to be compared to typical rainfall patterns including seasonal variations. Specifically drought in Australia is defined in relation to a rainfall deficiency of pastoral leases and is determined by decile analysis applied to a certain area.

Historical climatic records are now sufficiently reliable to profile climate variability taking into account expectations for regions. State Governments are responsible for declaring a region drought affected and the declaration will take into account factors other than rainfall.

=== Flooding ===
Though most of Australia is arid or semi-arid, some regions have very significant rainfall. The Wet Tropics in northeast Queensland as well as the western half of Tasmania both average over 1400mm (55 in) of rainfall annually, sometimes much higher. As a result, the former has some of Australia's only tropical rainforest, while the latter features extensive temperate rainforests where floods can occur at any time.

Through La Niña years the eastern seaboard of Australia (east of the Great Dividing Range) records above-average rainfall, usually creating damaging floods. The 2010–2011 La Niña system broke many rainfall records in Australia, particularly in the states of Queensland and New South Wales, with extensive flooding and major damage to infrastructure and crops. The central east area of Queensland, an area the size of Germany and France combined, was under water in 2010–11. La Nina related flooding has affected major eastern cities such as Sydney, and especially Brisbane. The 2022 eastern Australia floods were also one of the worst recorded flood events.

West of the Great Dividing Range, higher than average rainfall may be related to a negative Indian Ocean Dipole, which sometimes leads to inland flooding, particularly in the Murray–Darling basin river system and its flood plains and especially during winter.

The Top End, Kimberley and much of North and Far North Queensland are affected by the Australian monsoon (wet season) which brings heavy rain, thunderstorms, tropical cyclones (see below) and frequent flooding from November to April, making many unsealed roads impassable for part of the year. As a result, these regions feature extensive tropical savannah.

=== Tornadoes ===
In Australia, a tornado is also known as a twister or willy-willy. The earliest recorded tornado in Australia was in 1795. The country experiences about 60 tornadoes per year.

=== Tropical cyclones ===
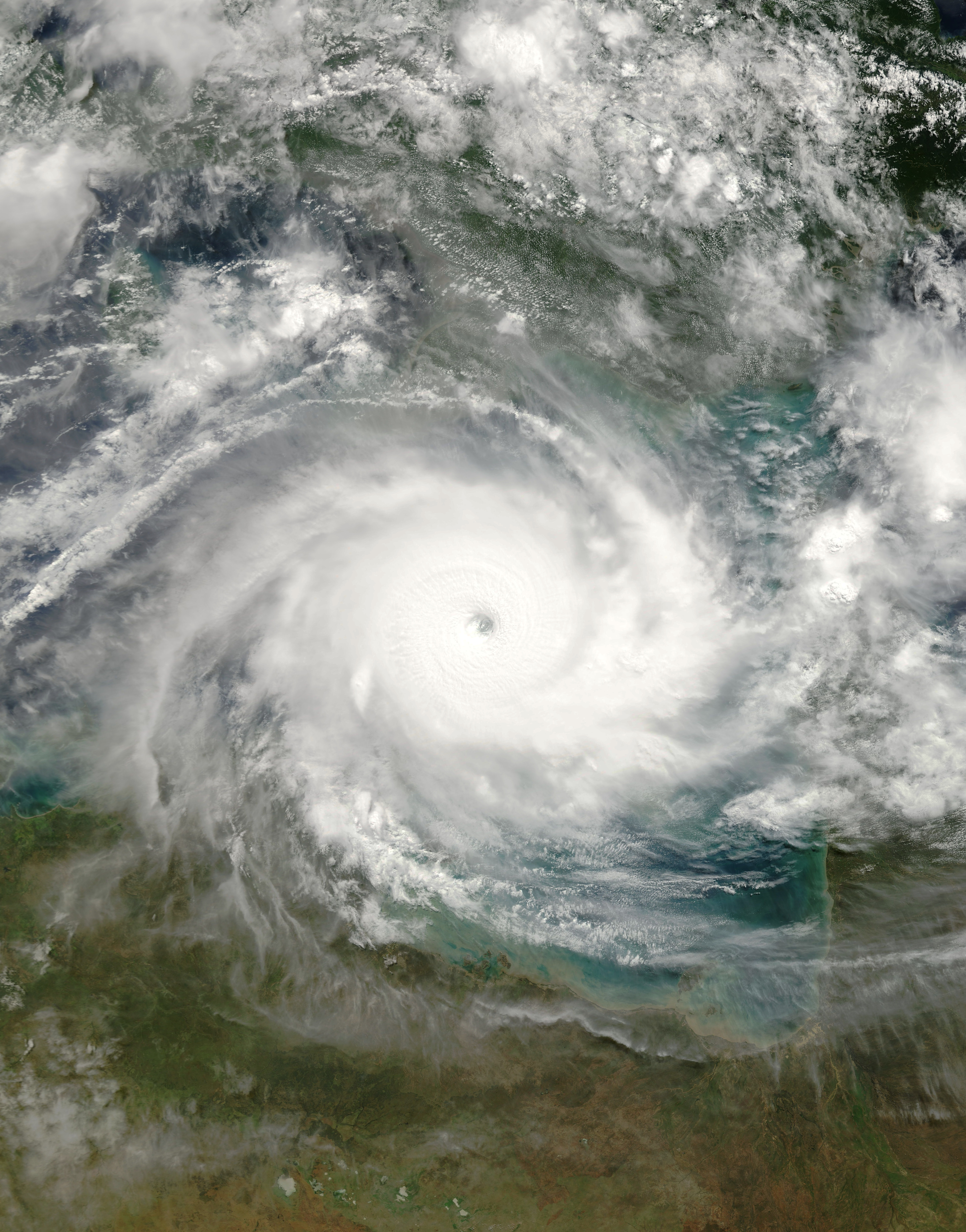
Cyclone Monica at peak intensity

Australia is affected by tropical cyclones which primarily occur between December and April but have occasionally developed in November and May. Cyclones over mainland Australia occur on average five to six times each year. The regions between Broome and Exmouth are most prone to cyclones. Tropical cyclones are known to bring destructive winds, heavy rain with flooding creating storm surges along the coast, causing inundation to low-lying areas. The strongest Australian region cyclone was 2006's Cyclone Monica, with gusts topping 350 km/h (220 mph). Cyclones can also move inland, decaying to rain depressions, dumping heavy rain and causing flooding.

The worst cyclones of Australia have caused billions of dollars of damage and many deaths. Cyclone Tracy crossed directly over Darwin in 1974, killing 71 persons. It was Australia's most damaging cyclone. Cyclone Mahina in 1899 brought a storm surge to Far North Queensland reaching 13 metres (43 ft) high, causing 400 deaths and making it the worst natural disaster to befall Australia. Cyclone Larry struck North Queensland and passed over Innisfail in 2006 causing damages estimated at A$1.5 billion. However, there were no deaths in that storm. Cyclone Yasi caused severe flooding and had a total estimated cost of A$3.5 billion making it the second-most costliest cyclone to strike Australia.

== Climate change ==
Australian annual average temperature anomaly from 1910 to 2019 with five-year locally weighted ('lowess') trend line. Source: Australian BOM.

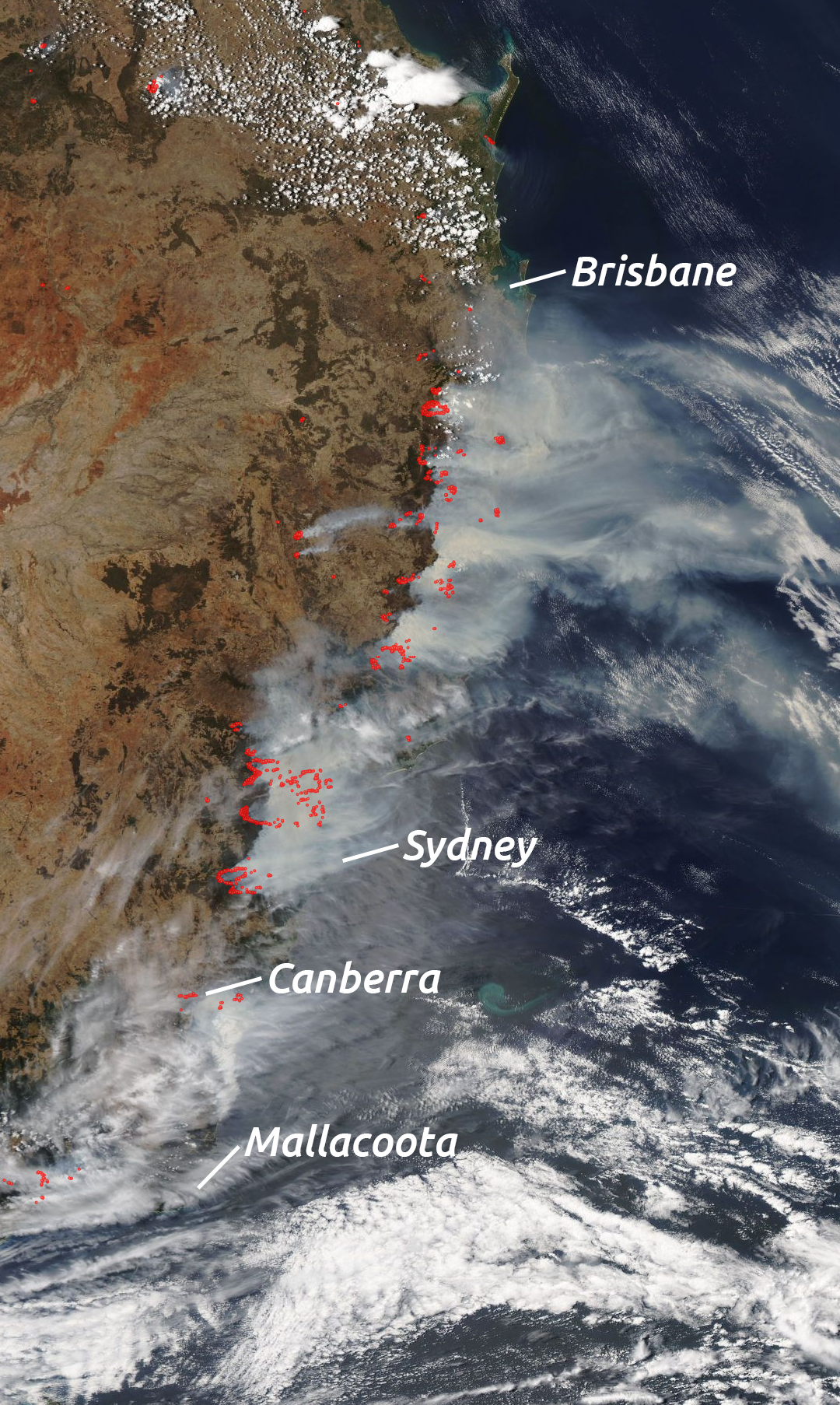
Climate change is increasing the frequency and size of bushfires, as evidenced by the 2019–20 Australian bushfire season.

Climate change has been a critical issue in Australia since the beginning of the 21st century. Australia is becoming hotter and more prone to extreme heat, bushfires, droughts, floods, and longer fire seasons because of climate change. Climate issues include wildfires, heatwaves, cyclones, rising sea levels, and erosion.

Since the beginning of the 20th century, Australia has experienced an increase of over 1.5 °C in average annual temperatures, with warming occurring at twice the rate over the past 50 years compared with the previous 50 years. In 2025, the Australian Government reported "high confidence" that the global temperature rise "will stabilise some" at the increase of 1.5-3 °C. Recent climate events such as extremely high temperatures and widespread drought have focused government and public attention on the effects of climate change in Australia. Rainfall in southwestern Australia has decreased by 10–20% since the 1970s, while southeastern Australia has also experienced a moderate decline since the 1990s. Rainfall is expected to become heavier and more infrequent, as well as more common in summer rather than in winter. Australia's annual average temperatures are projected to increase 0.4–2.0 °C above 1990 levels by the year 2030, and 1–6 °C by 2070. Average precipitation in the southwest and southeast Australia is projected to decline during this time, while regions such as the northwest may experience increases in rainfall.

Climate change is affecting the continent's environment and ecosystems. Australia is vulnerable to the effects of global warming projected for the next 50 to 100 years because of its extensive arid and semi-arid areas, already warm climate, and high annual rainfall variability. The continent's high fire risk increases this susceptibility to changes in temperature and climate. Meanwhile, Australia's coastlines will experience erosion and inundation from an estimated 8–88 centimetres (3.1–34.6 in) increase in global sea level. Australia's unique ecosystems such as the Great Barrier Reef and many animal species are also at risk.

Climate change also has diverse implications for Australia's economy, its agriculture and public health. Projected impacts include more severe floods, droughts, and cyclones. Furthermore, Australia's population is highly concentrated in coastal areas at risk from rising sea levels, and existing pressures on water supply will be exacerbated. The exposure of Indigenous Australians to climate change impacts is exacerbated by existing socio-economic disadvantages which are linked to colonial and post-colonial marginalisation. The communities most affected by climate changes are those in the North where Aboriginal and Torres Strait Islander people make up 30% of the population. Aboriginal and Torres Strait Islander communities located in the coastal north are the most disadvantaged due to social and economic issues and their reliance on traditional land for food, culture, and health. This has raised the question for many community members in these areas, "Should we stay or move away?"

Australia is also a contributor to climate change, with its greenhouse gas emissions per capita above the world average. The country is highly reliant on coal and other fossil fuels, although renewable energy coverage is increasing. National climate change mitigation efforts include a commitment to achieving net zero emissions by 2050 under the Paris Agreement, although Australia has repeatedly ranked poorly in the Climate Change Performance Index and other international rankings for its climate targets and implementation. Climate change adaptation can be performed at national and local levels and was identified as a priority for Australia in the 2007 Garnaut Review.

Climate change has been a divisive or politicised issue in Australian politics since the 2000s, contributing to successive governments implementing and repealing mitigation policies such as carbon pricing. Some Australian media outlets have promoted climate misinformation. The issue has sparked protests in support of climate change policies, including some of the largest demonstrations and school strikes in Australia's history.

== See also ==
- Indigenous Australian seasons
- List of wettest tropical cyclones by country § Australia
- Weather extremes in Australia, an index of extreme Australian weather articles
- Effects of the El Niño–Southern Oscillation in Australia
- Australian monsoon
