= Borrona Downs Station =

Pastoral lease in New South Wales

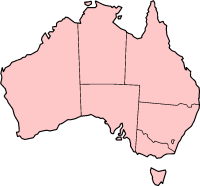
Map of state borders in Australia

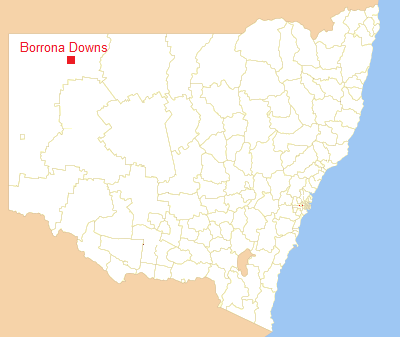
Map showing the location of Borrona Downs in New South Wales

Borrona Downs Station is a cattle station near White Cliffs in far western New South Wales, Australia. It is about halfway between Milparinka, around 100 km to the West, and Wanaaring, around 100 km to the East, as the crow flies.

The Borrona Downs Station airstrip is at 29°45'4"S 143°6'4"E, on Bloodwood Creek east of the Pindera Downs Aboriginal Area, about 890 km west-northwest of Sydney, 160 km north of White Cliffs and 140 km east of Tibooburra, New South Wales.

Borrona Downs is about 120m above sea level. For many years the station has been operated by the Taylor family.
