= Floods in Australia =

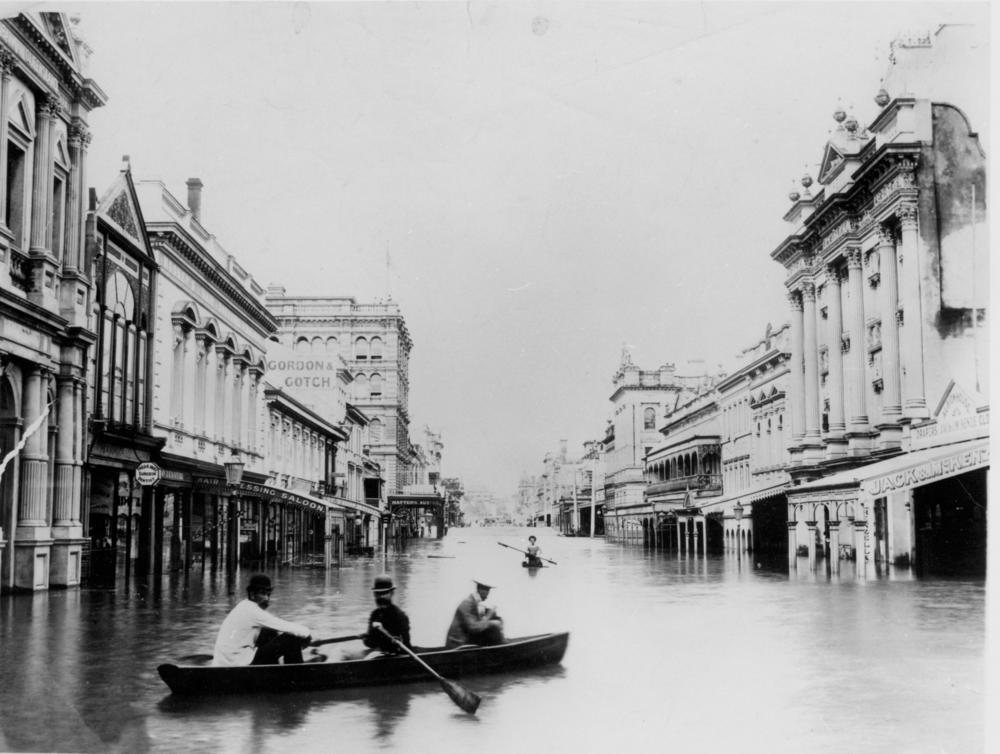
1893 Brisbane flood

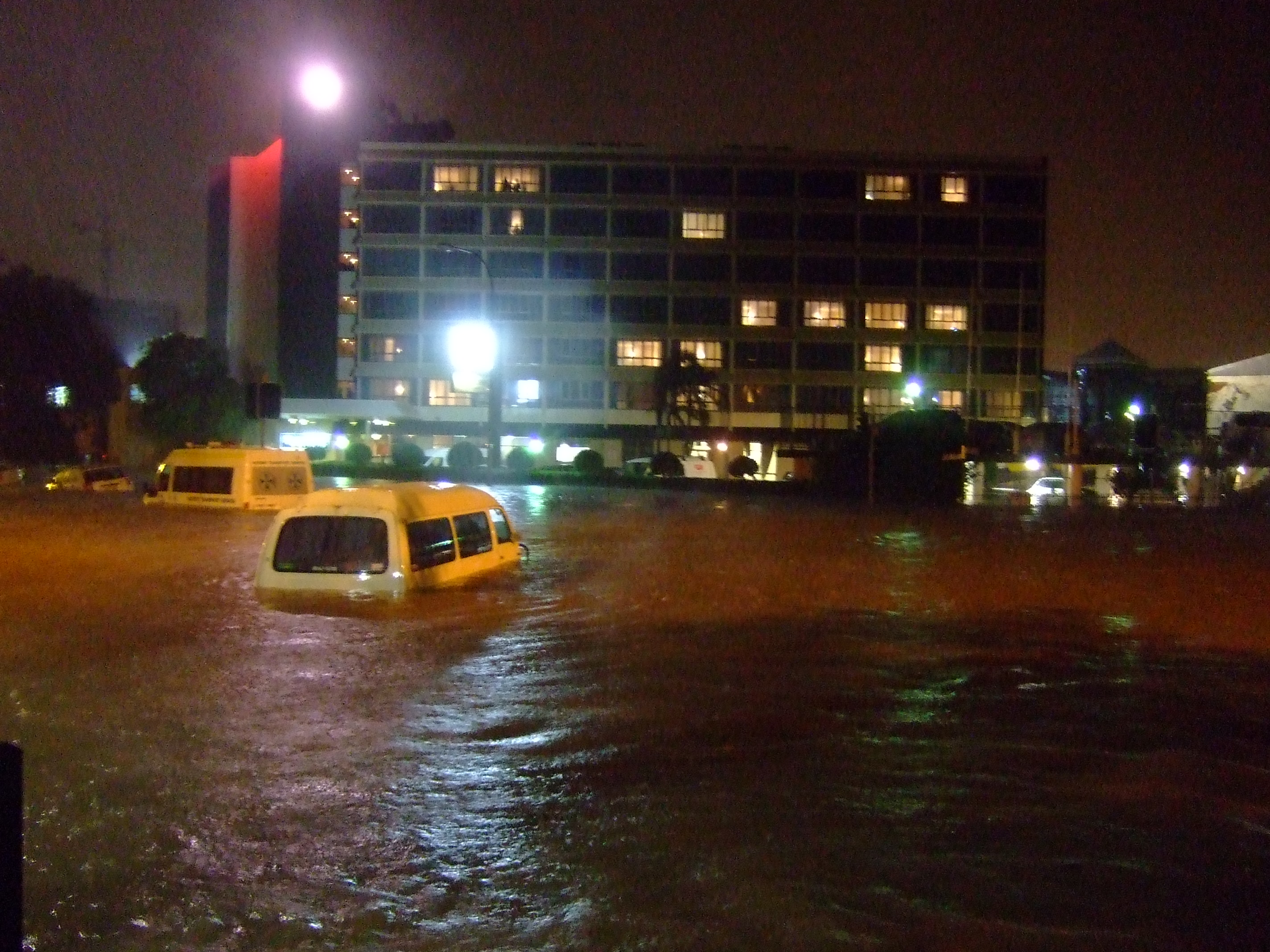
Flooding in Newcastle in 2007

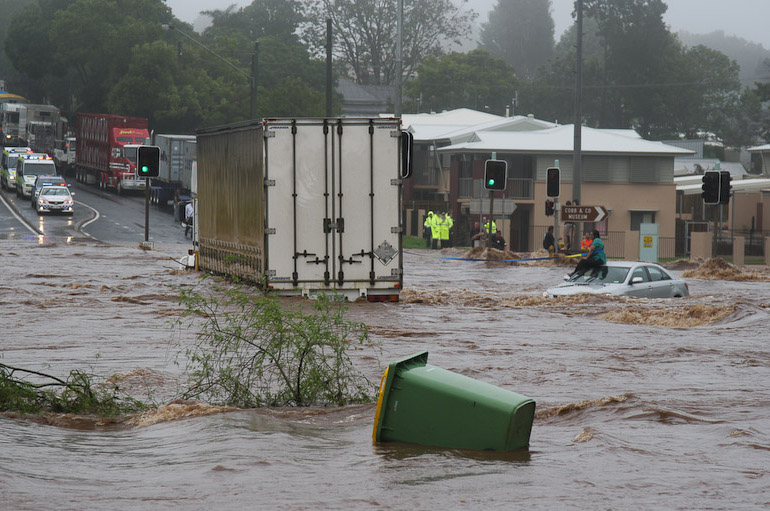
Queensland 2010–2011 floods

Australia has had numerous floods in the last 10 years, many of which have taken out homes, wildlife and many habitats.

The following floods have occurred in Australia since 1806:

Date	Location	State(s)	Fatalities	Notes
1806	Melbourne	VIC	4	
1820	Maitland	NSW		
1852	Gundagai	NSW	89	
1863	Melbourne (December)	VIC	1	
1867	Hawkesbury River (June)	NSW	12	
1869	Ballarat	VIC	2	
1891	Melbourne (July)	VIC	1	
1893	Brisbane flood	QLD	11	
1893	Maitland	NSW	9	
1900	Western Australian floods	WA		
1909	Western Victorian floods	VIC	4	
1913	Maitland	NSW	1	
1916	Clermont	QLD	65	
1923	Adelaide	SA	3	
1926	Southwestern Australia	WA		
1927	Wollombi	NSW		
1929	Tasmanian Floods	TAS	22	
1930	Maitland	NSW		
1931	Maitland	NSW		
1934	Yarra River	VIC	35	
1947	June 1947 Tasmanian floods	TAS		
1949	Maitland	NSW		
1950	Maitland, Gippsland, West Queensland	NSW, VIC, QLD	1	
1951	Maitland	NSW		
1952	Maitland	NSW		
1955	Maitland flood	NSW	14	
1955	All southern states (August)	WA, SA, VIC, NSW, TAS	2	
1956	Murray River flood	NSW, VIC, SA		
1970	All eastern states (December)	QLD, NSW, VIC, TAS	16	
1971	Canberra flood	ACT	7	
1971	Tadpole flood	NSW		
1974	Brisbane flood	QLD	16	
February 1984	West Dapto	NSW	not known	
1986	Sydney	NSW	6	
1990	East Coast	NSW	7	
1996	Queensland and New South Wales	NSW & QLD	4	
1998	Katherine; Townsville; Wollongong	NT, QLD, NSW	3	
June 2007	Hunter Valley/Maitland floods	NSW	10	
June 2007	Gippsland Floods	VIC		
February 2008	Mackay floods	QLD		
September 2010	Victorian floods (Sept)	VIC		
March 2010	Queensland floods (March)	QLD		
December 2010	Carnarvon/Gascoyne (December)	WA		
December 2010 – January 2011	Queensland floods (Dec – Jan)	QLD	35	
January 2011	2011 Victorian Floods (Jan)	VIC	2	
August 2011	Gippsland (August)	VIC	1	
February – March 2012	Eastern Australia (Feb – Mar)	NSW, VIC, QLD	3	
March 2012	Gippsland and Koo wee rup	VIC	0	
January – February 2013	2013 Eastern Australia Floods (Jan)	QLD, NSW	6	
April 2015	2015 Hunter Valley/Central Coast/Sydney Floods	NSW	8	
May 2015	South – East Queensland Flash Floods	QLD	5	
June 2016	Tasmanian Floods	TAS	3	
September 2016	Central West and Riverina Floods	NSW	1	
February 2017	Western Australian Floods	WA	2	
Late March 2017	Eastern Australian Floods caused by Cyclone Debbie	Southern Queensland, Northern NSW	12	
January – February 2019	Townsville flood	Queensland	5	
February 2020	Widespread flooding in Sydney basin and the Blue Mountains, flooding in central west to the north of NSW, caused by Tropical Cyclone Damien in Karratha	NSW, WA	0	
March 2021	Widespread flooding in the Sydney basin and the Mid North Coast of NSW (2021 eastern Australia floods). Extending into South East Queensland	NSW, South East Queensland	3 (As of 25 March 2021)	
9–10 June 2021	Widespread flash flooding across Gippsland. 160,000 properties blacked out, some for 4 days or more. Traralgon in the Latrobe Valley was one of the hardest-hit places with 200 homes evacuated.	Victoria	2	
November 2021	Central Queensland	Queensland		
January 2022	Wide Bay-Burnett, Fraser Coast and Gympie Regions, caused by ex-Tropical Cyclone Seth	Queensland	3	
February 2022	Eastern Australia floods	Queensland, NSW	23, 1 missing	
March 2022	Eastern Australia floods	South East Queensland, NSW	4	
July 2022	New South Wales	NSW	1	
October 2022	South eastern Australia floods	VIC, TAS, NSW	7	
October 2023	Gippsland	VIC		
December 2023	Cairns Flood	QLD		
January – February 2025	North Queensland	QLD	2	
May 2025	New South Wales	NSW	5	
