= 2022 Australian rainfall records =

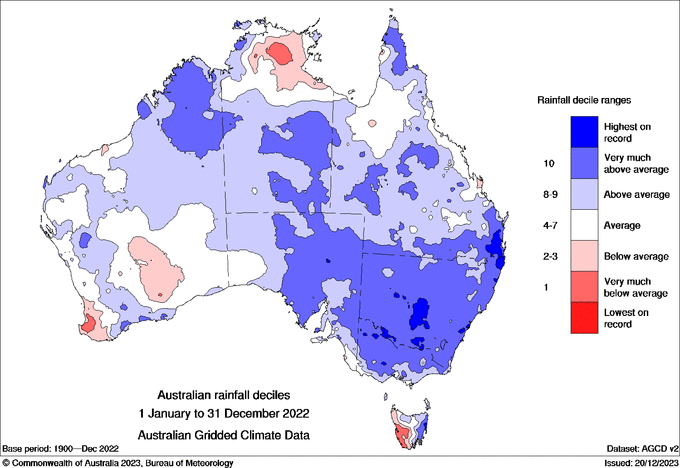
The rainfall deciles in 2022, according to the Bureau of Meteorology

2022 was an extremely wet year for Australia, coming out of a back-to-back La Niña in the summer of 2021–22, a Negative Indian Ocean Dipole developing over the winter and a third back-to-back La Niña in the spring of 2022.

== Monthly records ==
=== January ===
Rainfall nation-wide in January 2022 was 30% higher than average, the fourth highest on record for South Australia and the seventh highest for Victoria.

Ex-Tropical Cyclone Seth bought over 400 millimetres or 16 inches of rain to the hills outside Gympie, with 674 millimetres or 26.54 inches falling in Marodian.

Cyclone Tiffany (2022) bought heavy rain to Far North Queensland, crossing the Gulf of Carpentaria and moving inland of Western Australia, bringing heavy rain to the Outback, inland Western Australia, Southern Northern Territory, and South Australia, isolating many communities.

=== February ===
A blocking high at the end of the month brought record breaking rain for Eastern Australia.

677 millimetres or 26.65 inches fell in Brisbane in 3 days from the 28th breaking the old 3 day rainfall record of 600.4 millimetres or 23.64 inches in 1974 Brisbane recorded its second-highest February rainfall on record recording 887 millimetres or 34.92 inches. (Note: 1,026 millimetres or 40.39 inches was recorded at an older site in February 1893.) Cities such as Toowoomba and the Sunshine Coast had their monthly record broken and Gympie recording their wettest February in 30 years.

On the 28th, 701.8 millimetres or 27.63 inches fell in Upper Coopers Creek, being the wettest day recorded for New South Wales since 1954, the third highest ever in the state, and the highest in Australia since 1998.

=== March ===
March Rainfall was 74% above average for NSW, and 35% above average for Victoria however overall rain was 27% below average for Australia.

A large number of sites in NSW recorded their wettest March on record, in Greater Sydney, Illawarra, Northern Rivers and the Mid North Coast saw numerous daily records and monthly records broken. With totals in excess of 1000mm being recorded.

Sydney broke its all time March record with 537 millimetres or 21.14 inches falling throughout the month, breaking the old record of 521.4 millimetres or 20.53 inches set in 1942.

=== April ===
Rainfall was 27% above average nation-wide. the ninth highest on record for both NSW and Queensland. Rainfall was above average, especially for the South Coast, Central and Western NSW. parts of Upper Western Queensland experienced their wettest April on record.

=== May ===
May rainfall was 40% above average for Australia.

A cold front and low pressure system crossed Tasmania at the start of the Month seeing record daily rainfalls for May. Many stations saw rainfall daily records along the east coast of Queensland and the Pilbara. Heavy Rain fell over large parts of Queensland with totals from 150 to 300 millimetres (6 to 12 in) were common. An upper level cloud-band embedded with thunderstorms brought record breaking rain to the Pilbara with towns such as Onslow and Mardie breaking their May rainfall record, 310.4 millimetres or 12.22 inches and 268.8 millimetres or 10.58 inches being received.

Queensland recorded its fifth-wettest May on record with being 145.8% above average, numerous stations recorded their wettest May on record. Eumundi, Queensland receiving 645.4 millimetres or 25.41 inches.

Hobart saw its second-wettest May since 1958 (Note: Behind May 2018's 146.2 millimetres or 5.76 inches of which 129.2 millimetres or 5.09 inches fell on 11 May alone. The all-time May rainfall record in Hobart for 1958 was 213.8 millimetres or 8.42 inches.) with 134.6 millimetres or 5.30 inches and also its second-wettest May day with 85.6 millimetres or 3.37 inches on the 6th.

=== June ===
June was drier than average for large parts of the Country, NSW experiencing its eighth-driest June. Northern Territory rainfall was above average and several stations broke June records. Large parts of the NT experience a Dry season during this time, so above average rainfalls do not have to be significant.

=== July ===
An Australian east coast low affected NSW during the start of the month, bringing torrential rain to South Coast, Illawarra, Greater Sydney, Mid North Coast and the Hunter Valley. With Numerous records being broken. Daily Records were smashed in many stations, Taree breaking their all-time daily record receiving 305 millimetres or 12.01 inches on the 7th. Darkes Forest, New South Wales broke a 122-year-old record receiving 875 millimetres or 34.45 inches. Cities such as Katoomba, Central Coast, and Campbelltown saw their July Rainfall Records Broken. Sydney received 8 months of rain in 4 days. Sydney recorded 344.2 millimetres or 13.55 inches for July.

A number of stations in QLD broke their July Records, such as Kuranda receiving 231.1 millimetres or 9.10 inches.

=== August ===
Numerous cold fronts swept across Southern Australia. Parts of southern and central NSW recorded their wettest August on record, Parkes, New South Wales saw 95.8 millimetres or 3.77 inches and Thredbo recorded 424.8 millimetres or 16.72 inches. Canberra recorded its highest daily rainfall on the 5th, recording 54.8 millimetres or 2.16 inches.

Sydney reached 2,000 millimetres or 79 inches in record time on the 31st August.

=== September ===
September was the fifth-wettest on record for Australia. Out of season heavy rain affected North West WA and tropical moisture was brought down to the southern states through a large cloud band causing heavy rain and storms. An offshore low pressure system brought heavy rain to North East NSW and South East Queensland.

On 3 September, a low pressure system crossed the Gascoyne, WA and 15 percent of the state experienced its highest September daily rainfall on record. Towns such as Meekatharra broke September rain records receiving 56.4 millimetres or 2.22 inches. Large parts of the Pilbara and Gascoyne experienced the wettest September on record.

Much of Victoria's north experienced above average rainfall, with sites having their highest September rainfall on record. Ultima, Victoria received 155 millimetres or 6.10 inches, its highest on record for September. other towns that experienced record rain are Swan Hill and Combienbar.

NSW recorded its 5th highest September rainfall on record, with the Lower Western, Central West, Northern Tablelands, Mid North Coast and Northern Rivers all experiencing above average rainfall. Many sites had their highest September rainfall on record. Tamworth, experienced its wettest September on recording 145.2 millimetres or 5.72 inches. Other towns that broke the September rainfall records include: Pilliga, Barraba, Narrabri and Murwillumbah.

=== October ===
The beginning of October saw Sydney break its all time yearly record recording 2,199.8 millimetres or 86.61 inches on the 6th of October. Beating the all time annual high set in 1950 of 2,194 millimetres or 86.38 inches. Every new rain total will result in the record being broken.

Canberra broke its all time October record on 27 October, beating the 1976 record of 161 millimetres or 6.34 inches.

Heavy rainfall affected large parts of Victoria and Tasmania, and continued through NSW throughout the month. As of 29th October, many towns in northern NSW had seen their wettest October on record, including Moree, Narrabri, Armidale, Gunnedah and Tamworth. Many towns across Victoria have also seen their wettest October on record such as Echuca, Bendigo and Shepparton.

Sydney broke its all time October record on 24 October receiving 286.8 millimetres or 11.29 inches.

== See also ==
- Weather of 2022
- 1950 Australian rainfall records
- Floods in Australia
