= Queensland floods =

Queensland floods or Brisbane floods may refer to:

- March 2010 Queensland floods
- 2010–2011 Queensland floods
- January 2012 floods
- January 2013 eastern Australia floods; see Cyclone Oswald
- 2021 eastern Australia floods
- 2022 eastern Australia floods
- 2025 Queensland floods

== See also ==
- Brisbane River#Floods
