= The Border Star =

The Border Star was a newspaper published in Coolangatta, Queensland, Australia from 1927 to 1942, with its final issue appearing on 30 January.

This newspaper has been digitised and is available on Trove.
