= Jazzland Coolangatta =

Coordinates: 28.1680°S 153.5352°E

Image and description of Jazzland Dance Palais as it appeared in the Northern Star 1 November 1939.

Jazzland Dance Hall, also known as Jazzland Dance Palais, was a dance hall located in Coolangatta, Queensland. The venue was built in 1928 and was used as an entertainment venue throughout the first half of the twentieth century. Though no longer used for dances and social events, the building remains at the western end of McLean Street at the intersection with Griffith Street. The former dance hall is listed on the Gold Coast Local Heritage Register as a rare surviving purpose built ballroom built in Queensland, Australia during the interwar period and in acknowledgement of its role of the social life of the region. It is also recognised in the Coolangatta Local Area Plan for its heritage and character components. In 2002 the building was considered for the Queensland State Heritage Register but was not listed.

== History ==
In the early 1920s, jazz floors and jazz halls began to appear in Coolangatta, Queensland following proposals to improve the foreshore and a venue known as Jazzland is known to have been operating immediately before the Christmas and New Year's holiday season in December 1926 with dances being recorded on both the 24 and 25 December 1926. This time period coincides with the opening of a number of dance venues in the region, including the Pier Theatre with its large dance floor in Southport, Queensland at the northern end of the coast. The 1926 holiday season was a busy one in Coolangatta, Queensland when at least one of the '...jazz floors [was] thrown open for jazzing at an early hour, and continued open throughout the night...' without the permission of the local Council. In ongoing court cases, The Diggers Hall is mentioned by name, as is a Mr. Cahill of the Capitol Theatre.

Mr. Joseph Michael Cahill, who owned the leases of the nearby Capitol Theatre and Empire Theatre, and his wife Rose, a pianist, were involved with the jazz scene of the region before 1928. Mr. Cahill was also a member of the local Coolangatta Town Council and a committee member of the group of citizens lobbying for jazz floors and skating rinks on the foreshore in 1924. In late 1926, Mr. Cahill had disposed of his interests in the Empire Theatre and newspaper articles from the same period start referring to Cahill's jazz floor though the location is not specified. It is known that radio broadcasts were taking place at Cahill's jazz floor in the days immediately before the first reported dances at a venue called Jazzland. Mr. Cahill was involved with both.

In May 1926 Mr. Cahill applied to the Coolangatta Town Council to build a jazz hall in the main street of Coolangatta, Queensland and approval was given in November 1926. In 1931, the sale of the 'Jazzland block' was reported as having been made to Mr. Cahill a few years earlier, in 1927, for £3,200 with later improvements totaling £700. While some jazz evenings and dance events occurred at the Capitol Theatre, Mr. Cahill was certainly responsible for the eventual construction of a timber building measuring 85 feet by 40 feet called Jazzland that was officially opened in the presence of local dignitaries on the 9 November 1928 on the western end of McLean Street. This first dance hall was built from local timber and had alcoves along each side with a fernery planned for one side. One of the earliest functions in Jazzland was a dance to benefit the Kirra Surf Life Saving Club. Over 100 couples were on the dance floor and a euchre party took place in the garden annex. The room was decorated in the colours of the club with gold and blue ribbons and the electric lights were shaded in the same tones.

=== Conversion and renovation in the 1930s ===
By 1930 Cahill's Jazzland had been converted into a garage and the Coolangatta Town Council wanted both the alterations to cease and the building, which it considered a temporary structure, to be demolished. The property was formerly described as subdivisions 1 and 2 on allotment 3 of section 6 and it was reported as having two houses immediately behind it which were let to tenants. Mr. Cahill had obtained permission from the Council's building committee to adapt the building for use as a garage but the matter did not go before the full Council meeting. The alterations went ahead and the Kirra garage, leased by Mr. Shelley, started trading from the former dance hall. The area of the street was considered a first-class building section no longer suitable for a temporary timber structure and the area already had a preexisting purpose built brick garage that complied with the fire restriction requirements located nearby. Mr. Cahill was served with an order to remove the building he had constructed, referred to in newspaper reports as Jazzland and being used as a garage, from McLean Street. Considered the first case of its kind in Queensland, the matter eventually found its way to the Supreme Court where the court refused to issue the order compelling the Council to instruct Mr. Cahill to demolish the building. In 1931 Mr. Cahill had filed for bankruptcy with the Diggers Hall, Capitol Theatre and Jazzland being mentioned in proceedings.

By December 1931 attempts to stop the Cahill's from operating dances at Jazzland without a licence were made by Albert Keith Bedwell who ran another dance hall in Coolangatta. Both men were associated with the Diggers' Theatre and Capitol Theatre. Newspaper reports note that Mr. Cahill had requested that his license to hold dances at Bedwell's Diggers' Theatre be transferred to the Kirra Garage which had formerly been known as Jazzland. His request was refused but the dances went ahead and in April 1932 he was fined. In a March 1932 Council meeting Mr. Cahill is credited for running successful dances over the proceeding Christmas period at the building known as the Kirra Garage and questions about excessive delays in granting licenses to both Mr. Cahill and Mr. Bedwell were raised. The license was granted though prosecution of Mr. Cahill for breaking by-laws would proceed. Mr. Bedwell purchased the lease of the Pier Theatre at Southport, Queensland and, in addition to the Diggers' Theatre, also held the Capitol Theatre in 1931. When the Pier Theatre was destroyed by fire in April 1932, Mr. Bedwell was financially ruined, filed for bankruptcy and left Queensland to pursue opportunities in Melbourne.

It is unclear how Mr. Cahill held dances in Jazzland when the hall had been converted into a garage but requests to Mr. Cahill to cease offering dancing events at Jazzland, also known as Kirra Garage, continued into 1932 when he was also prosecuted for having a gambling device, known as a fruit machine, on the premises of his dance hall. At a court appearance Mr. Cahill explained that the profits from Jazzland and the Diggers' Theatre maintained the Capitol Theatre which was running at a loss. During this period, an application for an injunction was before the Supreme Court of Australia and Mr. Cahill was also suing an Alderman of the Coolangatta Town Council. At a later date, Mr. Cahill was responding to a complaint before Council that he had conducted dances during prohibited hours. In 1933 a bailiff entered Jazzland to take an inventory of the remaining items and seize assets on behalf of the Coolangatta Town Council to recover unpaid rates. During this period, Mr. Cahill indicated his intention to hand the property over to Morton and White. By October 1933 a syndicate of local businessmen are mentioned as the proprietors of Jazzland and Mr. Cahill's name starts to fade from newspaper reports about the property. In 1933, Jazzland was remodeled and redecorated for the busy Christmas and New Year holiday season and was reopened by the Mayor at a grand opening ceremony on 26 October 1933. In 1934 it was the venue for the dance to celebrate the jubilee of Coolangatta in 1934.

In 1939 the dance hall was considered too small to accommodate the large crowds and the original timber structure was enlarged by the managers, Border Theatre Pty. Ltd. The Border Theatre Pty. Ltd. had been registered in New South Wales in late 1939 with its directors being Septimus J. Humphries, Harry G. Palmer and Richard H. Sutton. The company controlled a number of dance halls and picture theatres in the Coolangatta, Queensland and Tweed Heads, New South Wales region.

The building, also referred to Jazzland Dance Palais during this time, underwent significant changes. The size of the dance floor was doubled and the updated hall contained a cloak room, lounge, kitchenette, state room, orchestra room, four shops and an arcade entrance finished in cream tiled floors and walls. The design style was reported as being a severe form of Art Deco with and angular stepped facade and ornamentation to the interior ceilings, both of which remain in situ. The annex featured a glass clerestory windows and ventilation was supplied throughout by ornamental grills and Venetian shutters. Inverted cones on the main pillars of the hall supplied additional lighting that had two colour controls.

The building was designed by Messers P. J. Board and Son of Lismore for flexibility with the ability to partition areas for private gatherings and small meetings. The construction work was contracted to Mr. Sutton of Murwillumbah, New South Wales. When completed, the new Jazzland measured 165 feet long and 66 feet wide and was described as being very similar to the Trocadero in Brisbane. With a dance hall measuring 114 feet in length, Jazzland had one of the largest dance floors in Queensland and was considered one of the finest dance halls between Sydney and Brisbane The front of the building had a continuous glass frontage with cream Brisbane bricks on the exterior, stainless steel moulds and the name of the venue displayed in large block letters. It was officially opened by the Mayor of Coolangatta, Alderman H. G. Winders on 16 December 1939.

Throughout its decades of operation as an entertainment and meeting venue, Jazzland was also the site of numerous local community and fund raising events including community singing, local balls, card parties, debutantes balls and dances for the Coolangatta Ambulance and Kirra Surf Life Saving Club. It also used as a venue for conventions and special functions arranged by local government.

During World War II, Jazzland was a popular place for American soldiers visiting the Gold Coast and Tweed Heads, New South Wales for rest and recreation to dance and be entertained. It also raised funds for the Coolangatta Patriotic Fund by hosting weekly dances where local returning service men were also formerly welcomed home in special presentations during interludes in the dancing. A ball organised by the local community to aid the local soldiers' rest home at Rainbow Bay attracted crowds of up to 700 people with music provided by the AIF band. Recruitment drives and rallies to encourage young men to enlist in the armed forces during World War II were also held in front of Jazzland during the evening.

In 1942 Jazzland was altered to comply with new Council requirements and in 1945, tenders was called to repaint the interior.

=== Closure and sale ===
In January 1951 Jazzland was sold by Mr. R. Sutton to Penny's chain stores and the last dance was held in the hall during October 1951. In recognition of the social importance of the venue, the government of the time reflected on the importance of providing a new dance venue for the young people of the area. As the only dance venue in the region, the local Council discussed purchasing Jazzland from its new owners so it could continue in use as an entertainment venue but attempts to ensure the continuance of Jazzland as a dance hall were unsuccessful. For the following decades the building was used as a store by a series of businesses. As part of the Bleach Festival in 2015, contemporary performances inspired by Jazzland entitled 'Sand Sound Shake' and 'The Inaugural Dance Affair' took place in McLean Street.

== Current Use ==
Jazzland is currently the home of 20th Century Antiques and Collectibles at 31–33 McLean Street. Since 2005, the owners of the building have sought permission to construct apartments on the site of the former dance hall.
