= 2025 New South Wales floods =

May disaster in New South Wales

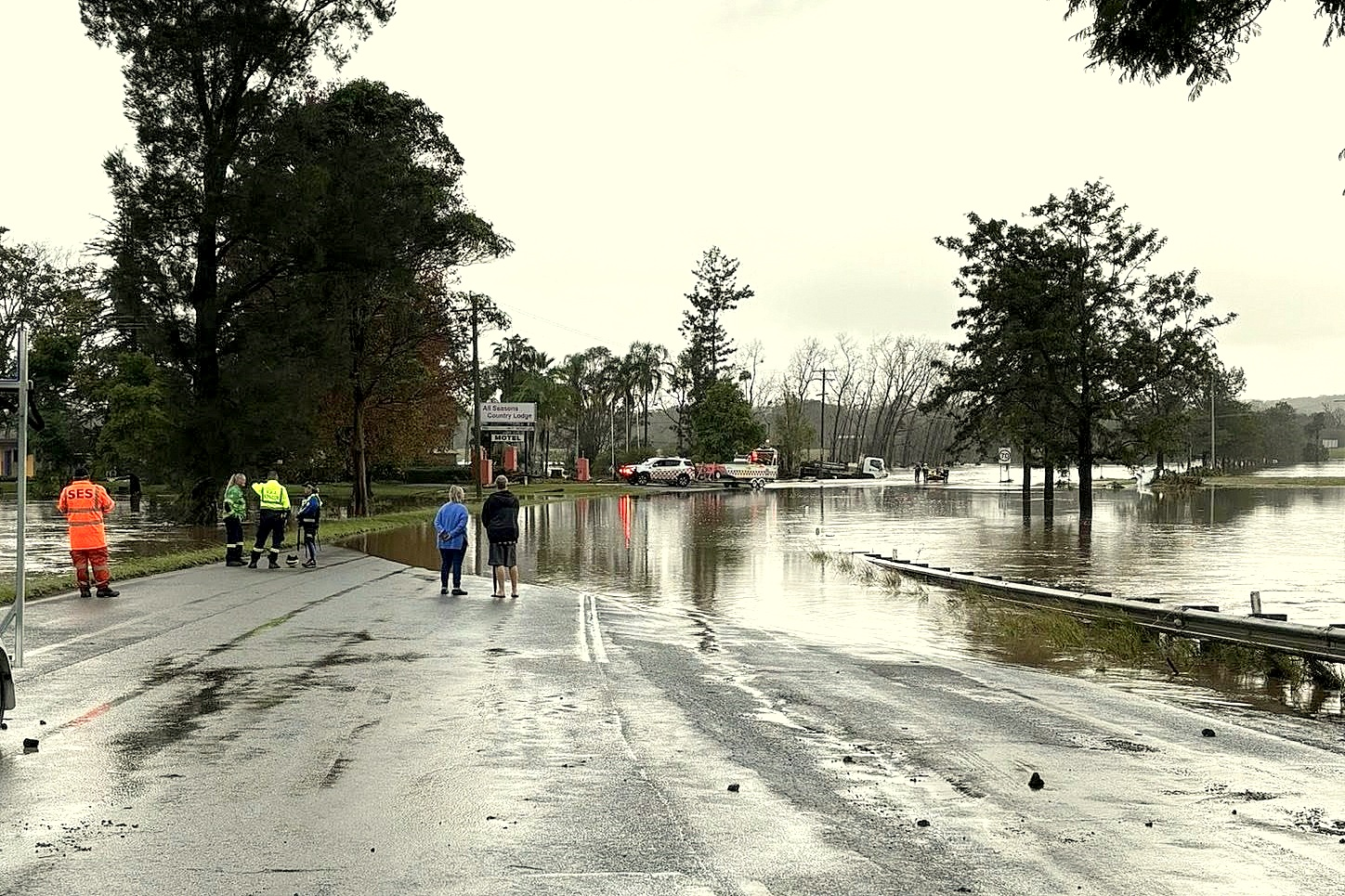
- River water rising over road at Taree
- Date: 20 May 2025 – 25 May 2025
- Location: Mid North Coast Hunter Valley Central Coast
- Cause: Stationary low pressure trough
- Deaths: 5

Flood
- Max. rainfall: 533 millimetres (21.0 in)

The 2025 New South Wales floods were a significant flooding event that impacted the New South Wales coast in May 2025, particularly the Mid North Coast and parts of the Hunter Valley region, including the towns of Taree, Wingham, Kempsey, Nambucca Heads, Sawtell, Dorrigo, Port Macquarie, and Coffs Harbour.

Caused by a slow-moving low pressure system and killing five people, it was the worst flood disaster in Mid North Coast region, with access to disaster funding been activated at both state and federal levels. The chief executive of Natural Hazards Research Australia, Andrew Gissing, stated that the flooding was the biggest on record for the region, and a 1-in-500-year event.

== Impact ==
Taree, which is 130 kilometres (81 mi) north-east of Newcastle, was ground zero of the floods, where dozens of residents were rescued from their housetops. More than 48,000 people were isolated by flooding on the NSW Mid North Coast and almost 10,000 homes were at risk, in addition to more than 1,000 calls being made to the New South Wales State Emergency Service (SES). There were more than 140 flood warnings for the region, including significant flood warnings for the Macleay, Hastings, and Manning rivers. A woman and four men died in the disaster, and one missing man was later found.

NSW premier, Chris Minns, stated that the region saw "levels of rise in local tributaries, creeks, rivers" that has not been experienced since 1920. On 21 May, residents in the low-lying areas at Macksville, Wauchope, East Bellingen, parts of Gloucester, Paterson were told to evacuate. Furniture from churches such as lounges, beds and chairs flowed downstream alongside council barriers, footgear and cows, which were found washed up on beaches as far south as Forster. Major rivers in the Greater Sydney area were issued with minor flood warnings for the latter days.

Over 5,000 homes and businesses from Woolgoolga to Forster had power outages, in addition to over 100 schools been closed. The Manning River at Taree broke an almost 100-year record where it passed 6 metres (20 ft) on 21 May. Low-lying farms in Barrington were destroyed. Submerged roads also caused a landslide between Dorrigo Mountain and Thora. The Pacific Highway was closed between Purfleet and Coopernook. In the coastal waters off the Mid North Coast around Nambucca Heads, muddy water with a clear brown shade was visible from satellite imagery. On 25 May, the Pacific Highway near Taree reopened and some supermarket supply chains like Woolworths and Coles still remained closed in Kempsey and Wingham.

== Meteorology ==
Receiving 427 millimetres (16.8 in) of rain over two days, Taree had the wettest May on record and experienced one-third of its annual average rainfall from 19 to 21 May. Taree also experienced the highest floodwaters in more than 90 years. The Bureau of Meteorology warned that the rain band causing the flood came from the north, after intensifying around Grafton and Coffs Harbour in the North Coast, and shifted south to Sydney, the South Coast and eastern Victoria. The Bureau of Meteorology recorded 312 millimetres (12.3 in) of rainfall in Bellingen, 533 millimetres (21.0 in) at Careys Peak, 207 millimetres (8.1 in) in Moparrabah and prevalent falls of up to 200 millimetres (7.9 in) through the New South Wales North Coast from Wednesday 22 May to the next day.

The main causes of the heavy rainfall were a near-stationary low pressure trough over the eastern seaboard in the Pacific Ocean, which barely moved over the span of four days, that was cooperating with a static pool of cold upper-level air and unyielding stream of moisture-laden, easterly winds brought by a high pressure system in the southern Tasman Sea. Furthermore, above average sea surface temperatures in the Tasman Sea delivered additional atmospheric moisture, thereby increasing water in the sky to drop as rainfall.

== Response ==
Emergency services carried out 284 flood rescues in the Mid North Coast and Hunter region, after 300 millimetres (12 in) of rain falling in the region in less than 24 hours. Thousands of SES crews worked to rescue people who were trapped in the floodwaters. Around 2,500 emergency workers were deployed, as well 500 appliances that included trucks, boats, and helicopters. Moreover, the state and federal governments activated disaster assistance to areas in 16 local government areas. Emergency Minister Kristy McBain stated that the Australian Defence Force personnel would be deployed for search and rescue on the night of 22 May to Taree.

On 24 May, the National Emergency Management Agency stated they were striving to restore food supply, telecommunications and power to communities, as around 50,000 people still remained cut off and 10,000 properties required damage assessment, in addition to food being scarce after several supermarkets losing all their produce in the disaster. On 25 May, NSW Minister for Roads Jenny Aitchison stated that debris removal has been expansive, with crews working continuously and freight access progressively improving. Furthermore, around 10,000 properties were still assessed for damage.

=== Reactions ===
Australia prime minister Anthony Albanese shared a message of support to the residents of the Hunter and Mid North Coast regions on Twitter, in addition to offering his condolences to the dead. NSW premier Chris Minns paid tribute to the victims at a press conference. Greens leader Larissa Waters blamed the climate crisis for the floods, stating that humans have been "burning too much coal and gas".

== See also ==
- 2021 eastern Australia floods
- 2022 eastern Australia floods
- 2025 Queensland floods
- Floods in New South Wales
