= Coolangatta =

- Suburb
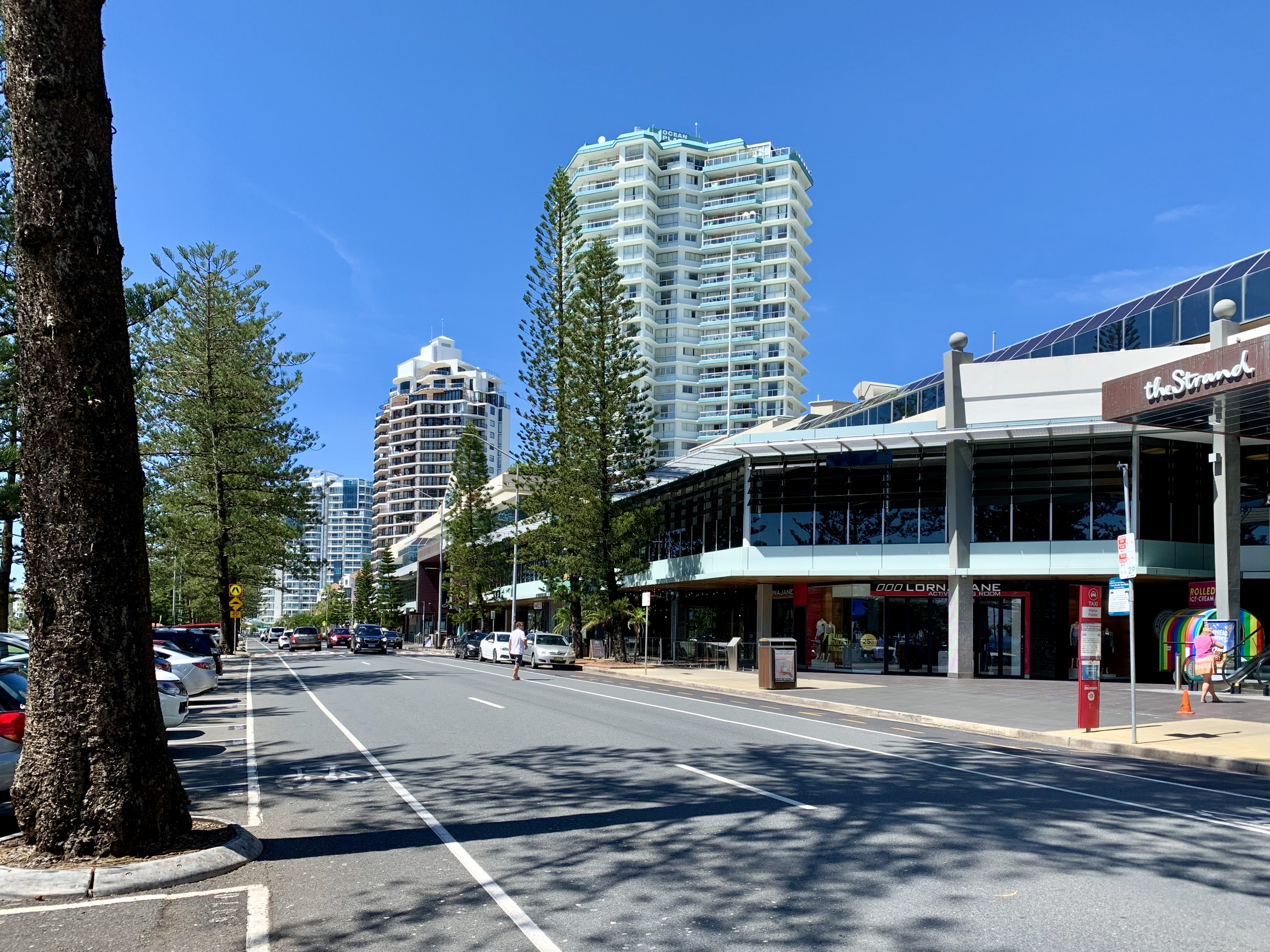
- Marine Parade

- Interactive map of Coolangatta
- Coordinates: 28.1708°S 153.5336°E
- Country: Australia
- State: Queensland
- City: Gold Coast
- LGA: City of Gold Coast
- Location: 23.8 km (14.8 mi) SSE of Surfers Paradise; 29.0 km (18.0 mi) SSE of Southport; 113 km (70 mi) SSE of Brisbane
- Established: 1883

Government
  - State electorate: Currumbin
  - Federal division: McPherson

Area
  - Total: 1.8 km^{2} (0.69 sq mi)
- Elevation: 6 m (20 ft)

Population
  - Total: 6,491 (2021 census)
  - Density: 3,610/km^{2} (9,340/sq mi)
- Time zone: UTC+10:00 (AEST)
- Postcode: 4225
Suburbs around Coolangatta
Bilinga	Coral Sea	Coral Sea
Bilinga	Coolangatta	Coral Sea
Tweed Heads West (NSW)	Tweed Heads (NSW)	Tweed Heads (NSW)

Coolangatta is a coastal suburb in the City of Gold Coast, Queensland, Australia. It is the Gold Coast's southernmost suburb and it borders New South Wales. In the 2021 census, Coolangatta had a population of 6,491 people.

== History ==
Coolangatta is located on Yugambeh Country. The Yugambeh people are recognised as Traditional Owners whose Country includes the Gold Coast region. Linguistic sources also discuss Yugambeh as part of the broader Yugambeh-Bundjalung or Bandjalangic dialect chain. Yugambeh language (also known as Yugumbir, Jugambel, Jugambeir, Jugumbir, Jukam, Jukamba) is one of the Australian Aboriginal languages in areas that include the Beenleigh, Beaudesert, Gold Coast, Logan, Scenic Rim, Albert River, Coolangatta, Coomera, Logan River, Pimpama, Tamborine and Tweed River Valley, within the local government boundaries of the City of Gold Coast, City of Logan, Scenic Rim Regional Council and the Tweed River Valley.

=== Early settlement ===
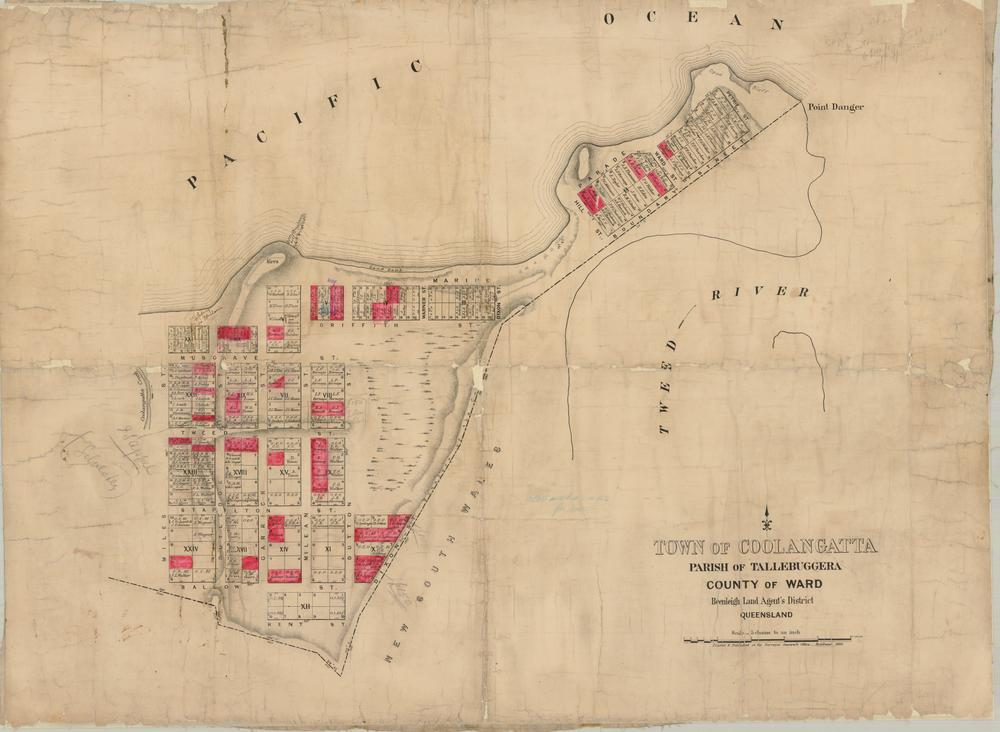
Estate map of the town of Coolangatta, Queensland, 1885

Coolangatta was one of the earliest settlements on the Gold Coast. Once again focused on a steep headland at Point Danger the area was occupied by Europeans from at least 1828 by a convict station and red cedar getters soon followed.

=== Wreck of the Coolangatta ===
On 18 August 1846, the schooner Coolangatta was wrecked on Kirra / Bilinga Beach adjacent to a creek during a storm.

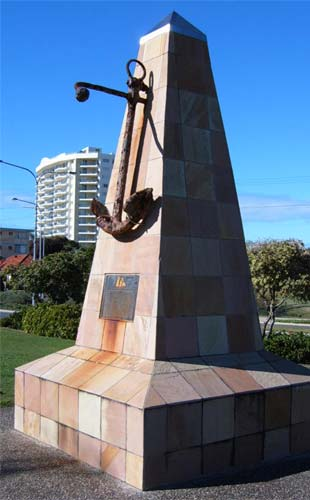
Anchor from Coolangatta wreck site memorial; creek at right

A topsail schooner of 83 feet (25 m) in length and 88 long tons (89 t), Coolangatta was built by John Blinksell in 1843 for Alexander Berry whose property, Coolangatta Estate, adjoined Coolangatta mountain located on the northern bank of the Shoalhaven River, New South Wales.

On 6 July 1846, the ship sailed under Captain Steele from Brisbane, carrying two convict prisoners (George Craig in irons, and William George Lewis), to load red cedar logs at the Tweed River for Sydney. Steele found the river entrance closed by silt forming a bar, so he anchored in the lee of Point Danger off Kirra Beach. Red cedar logs were then hauled overland from Terranora Inlet and rafted from the beach, but in six weeks less than half of the contracted 70,000 feet of red cedar had been loaded. Meanwhile, five ships loaded with red cedar were bar-bound inside the river.

On 18 August 1846, while Steel was ashore, a south-east gale blew up. Steele's boat was damaged while getting through the surf and he watched from the beach as the gale intensified. Eventually, the prisoners were freed and all hands abandoned ship and swam for shore as the anchors dragged. The ship parted its anchors and washed ashore near what was later called Coolangatta Creek.

The survivors walked 70 miles (110 km) north to Amity Point in six days, fed each night by different groups of friendly indigenous Australians, and were taken into Brisbane on board the Tamar.

=== Township develops ===
Selectors followed in the 1860s and a small settlement was established.

In 1883 a township was surveyed. A map of the town in 1885 shows the results of a recent land sale where several town lots were sold. Government surveyor Henry Schneider named the area Coolangatta after the shipwreck while surveying in 1883 for the land auction in March 1884.

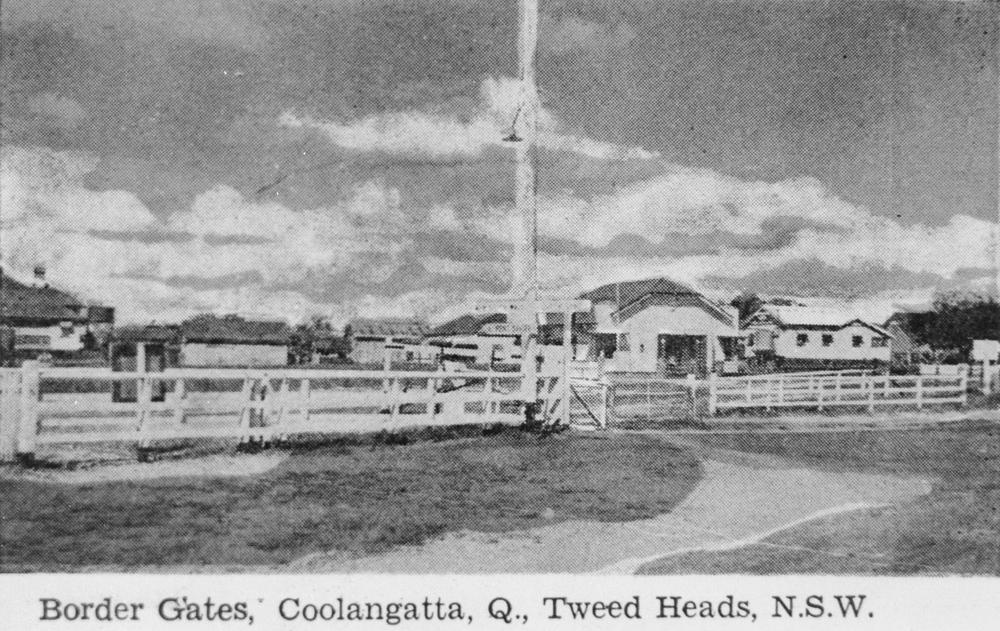
Border Gates between Coolangatta and Tweed Heads, 1943

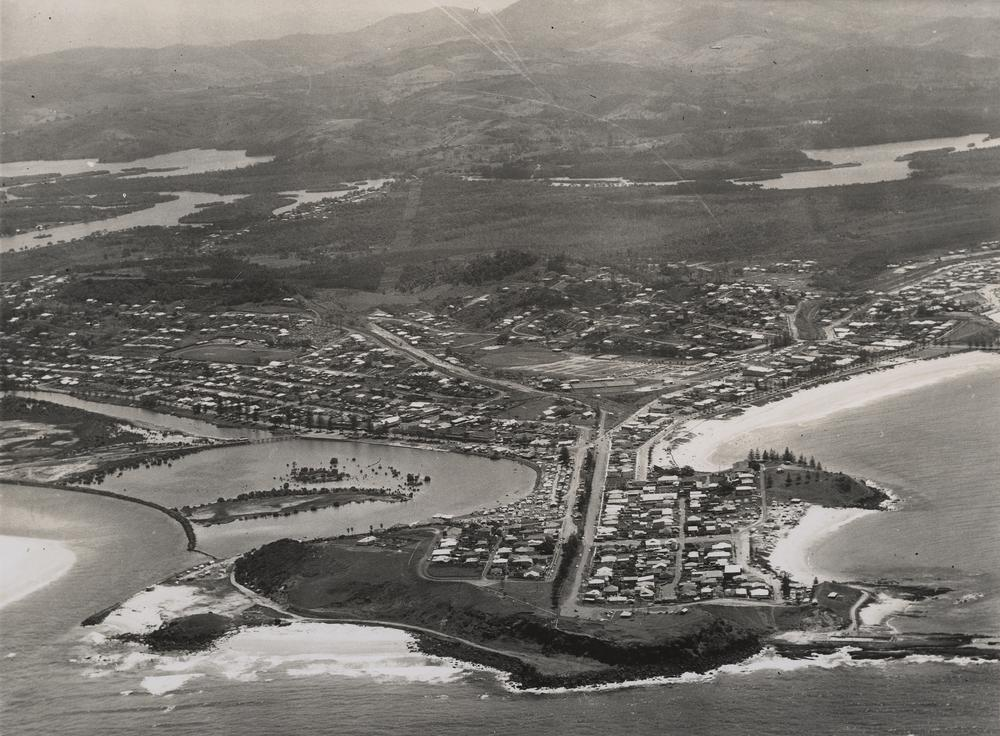
Aerial view looking towards Point Danger, Coolangatta, c. 1952. Tweed Heads (New South Wales) is to the left. The main road running inland from the headland is Boundary Street, which marks the state border.

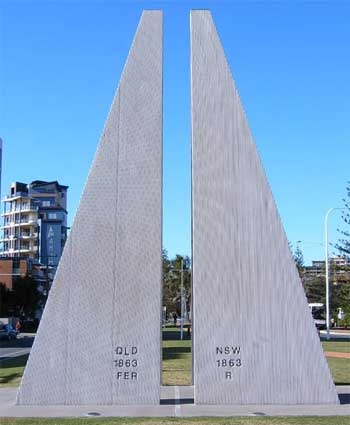
Border marker between two states, dividing the "Twin Towns"

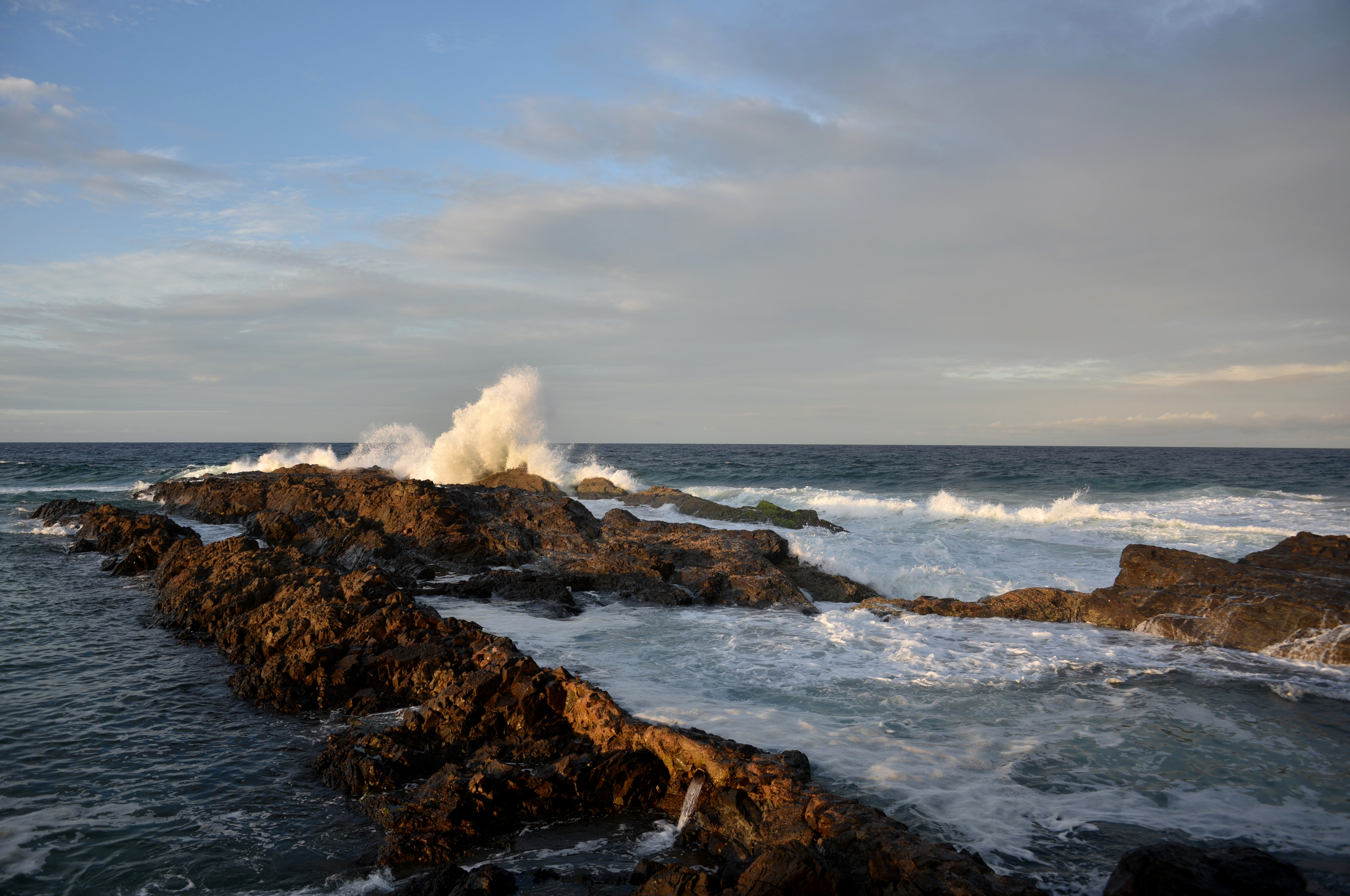
Snapper Rocks, a popular surfing and sea-bathing area in Coolangatta

As a border town Coolangatta included a customs office, boatshed and government wharf.

=== Twentieth century ===
The South Coast railway was extended from Nerang railway station to Tweed Heads in New South Wales and opened on 10 August 1903. Coolangatta railway station was located to the south of the intersection of Griffith and Dutton Streets (28.1685°S 153.5367°E). The terminus Tweed Heads railway station was in Tweed Heads near Thomson Street (28.1720°S 153.5405°E). The railway guaranteed the success of Coolangatta as a holiday township and it flourished from that time forward.

The Tweed Heads Surf and Life Saving Club was established on Friday 26 January 1909. Tweed Heads and Coolangatta Surf Life Saving Club building opened on 13 September 1911. Guesthouses and hotels were erected and a commercial centre soon followed.

Land was advertised for sale in December 1912, being allotments in sections 3, 14, 25, [16 & 17], town of Coolangatta and portion 44 (special lease) parish of Tallebudgera, with 7 allotments facing either Marine Parade or Griffith Street. A further 35 allotments immediately south of Coolangatta railway station and 2 further allotments facing McLean Street were also advertised for sale.

Prior to 1914, Coolangatta was administered by the Nerang Divisional Board, which became the Shire of Nerang in 1903. In 1914, Coolangatta had its own local government, the Town of Coolangatta, but in 1949 it was amalgamated into the Town of South Coast, which later became City of Gold Coast.

The Coolangatta Star newspaper was published from 1916 to 1927. In May 1927, the Tweed Heads and Coolangatta star amalgamated with the Coolangatta Chronicle to become the Border Star. The Border Star newspaper ceased publication in 1942.

In January 1919, the border between Queensland and New South Wales was closed to all traffic in response to the 1918 flu pandemic in an attempt to stop the spread of the disease north into Queensland. People found themselves stranded on the one side of the border unable to return to their homes or employment on the other side. Quarantine stations and camps were established to house travelers and stranded residents. One impact on the border closure was the need to duplicate services across the twin towns on the Queensland side of the border, as at 1 February 1919, Coolangatta had no doctor, no pharmacist, no milkman, no butcher and no undertaker. Nor did Coolangatta have a school nor a post office. The border remained closed until May 1919.

One of the services that required duplication was a school for 56 children living in Coolangatta but attending school in Tweed Heads. Previously on 28 June 1918 the Queensland Department of Public Instruction had indicated their intention to establish a school at Coolangatta but no progress had been made. When the Coolangatta children were unable to return to their Tweed Heads school in February 1919, the Coolangatta Town Council made a meeting room available in their council chambers for use as a temporary school room and the Queensland Department of Public Instruction sent school furniture and one teacher from Brisbane, and Coolangatta Provisional School commenced operation on 10 February 1919. The next task was to construct a school building with two classrooms on the school reserve at 1 Garrick Street (corner of Powell Street, 28.1675°S 153.5338°E) on Kirra Hill. Although expected to be completed in six months, it was not until the start of the 1920 school year that the new Coolangatta State School opened with 67 students under headmaster Claude de Jersey and another teacher. It was officially opened on 2 October 1920 by Queensland Governor Matthew Nathan. Growth in the school over the decades subsequently led to its relocation to Stapylton Street, officially opening there on 26 November 1977. The old school bell from Kirra Hill was relocated to the Stapylton Street where it remains in daily use.

There was a stump-capping ceremony held for the Coolangatta Methodist Memorial Church on Sunday 8 June 1924. The church was officially opened at 26-28 Lanham Street (28.1693°S 153.5356°E) on Sunday 27 September 1924 by Reverend Dr George Edward Rowe. Following the Methodist Church amalgamating into the Uniting Church in Australia in 1977, the church became Coolangatta Uniting Church. In June 1988 the Uniting Church in Coolangatta and Tweed Heads merged to form the Twin Towns Uniting Church. In 1992 the growing population in Banora Point in New South Wales resulted in the decision to open a Uniting Church there and in the late 1990s, that church became a parish in its own right with the Twin Towns parish now serving only Coolangatta.

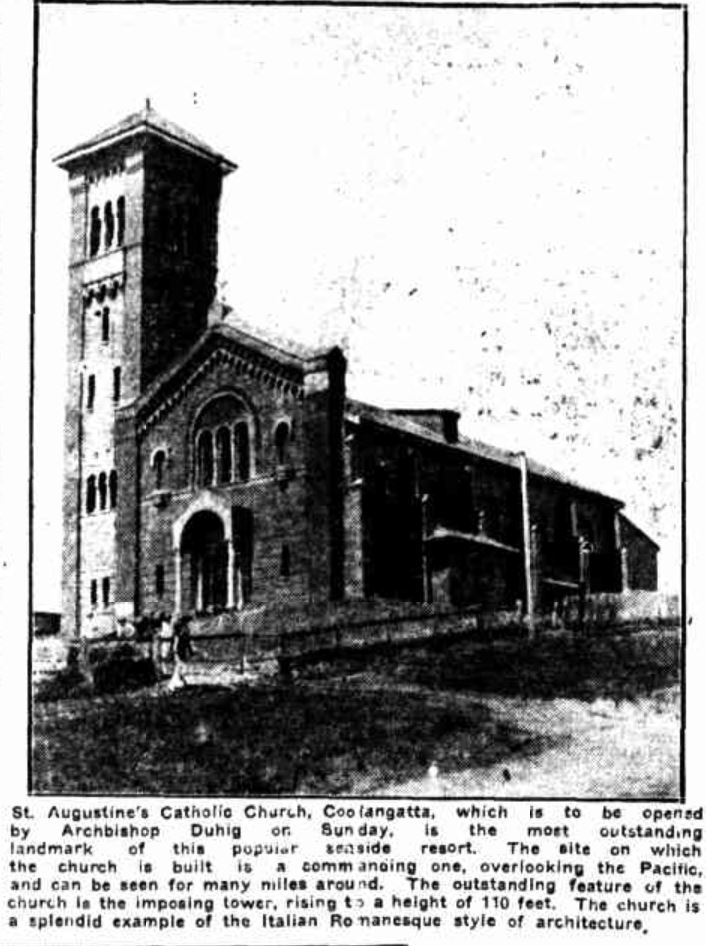
St Augustine's Catholic Church at its opening, December 1926

On Monday 31 April 1925 Archbishop James Duhig laid the foundation stone of St Augustine's Catholic Church. On Sunday 19 December 1926 Duhig returned to officially open and bless the church. The church was built in a commanding position overlooking the Pacific Ocean in the Italian Romanesque style. The tower is 110 feet (34 m) high.

St Augustine's Catholic School was established in 1926 by the Daughters of Our Lady of the Sacred Heart. From 1950 the school was operated by Missionary Franciscan Sisters of the Immaculate Conception. On 27 January 1987 the school relocated to a new site in Currumbin Waters. In 1992 the sisters ended their association with the school which is now under lay administration.

The foundation stone of St Peter's Anglican Church at 34 Lanham Street (corner of Dutton Street, 28.1693°S 153.5362°E) was laid on 31 October 1937 by Archbishop William Wand. It was dedicated in 1938 by Wand. Its closure circa 2013 was approved by Archbishop Philip Aspinall.

An unnamed cyclone crossed the coast at Coolangatta on the night of 20 February 1954. The storm quickly cleared from Queensland skies but moved south, causing widespread loss of life and flooding in New South Wales.

The railway line closed in 1961 due to the rising use of cars.

Little remains of the earliest structures at Coolangatta but some evidence remains of subsequent development in the early years of the twentieth century including the Coolangatta Hotel, Kirra Beach Hotel and St Augustine's Catholic Church (Coolangatta). In addition to the former Coolangatta State School, the Anzac Memorial (Coolangatta), Jazzland Coolangatta, the Kirra Beach Pavilion, Kirra Beach Shelter Shed and the remains of Jack Evans Porpoise Pool are on the Gold Coast Local Heritage Register.

The border fence and gates that until recently were a characteristic of the area have now been removed but the sense of the border remains at Boundary Street running along the ridge of the headland between Queensland and New South Wales. The headland itself is an important landmark and tourist destination and is the site of the Point Danger Lighthouse. Coolangatta symbolises the terminus of the Gold Coast and the long strip of beach that begins at Main Beach forty kilometres to the north.

Coolangatta and its surrounds were the home of two early tourist attractions on the Gold Coast. Jack Evans Porpoise Pool which was built at Snapper Rocks in 1957 and Gilltraps Auto Museum which was established at Kirra in 1959.

Coolangatta Special School opened on 1 January 1979 on the Kirra Hill site vacated by the Coolangatta State School. On 1 July 2006 the school was relocated to Currumbin Waters and renamed Currumbin Community Special School. Following local agitation from the "Save Kirra Hill" group, the school buildings at the Kirra Hill site were transferred to the Gold Coast City Council in 2008 for community purposes. The Council spent $3 million in restoration and refurbishment before officially opening the site as the Kirra Hill Cultural and Community Centre in October 2011. The Kirra Hill site is listed on the Gold Coast Local Heritage Register.

To commemorate the centenary of Coolangatta, in 1984 a stone from the Coolangatta Estate homestead was donated by the citizens of Coolangatta near Berry, New South Wales and was mounted on a plinth of granite from Aberdeen, Scotland, the birthplace of Alexander Berry.

=== Twenty-first century ===
The Coolangatta library opened in 2013.

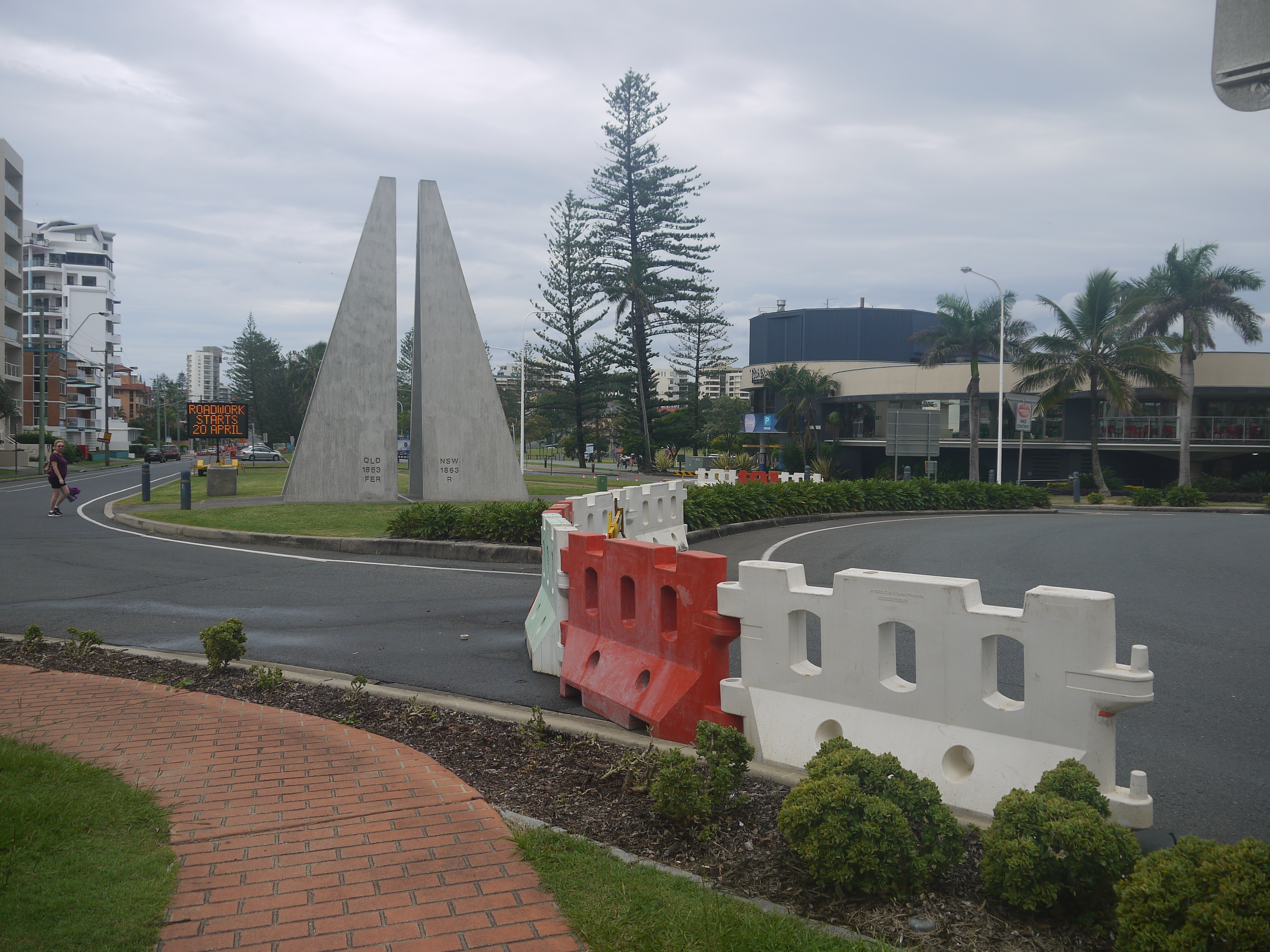
Coolangatta as seen in April 2020, when Queensland closed the border to New South Wales in the early stages of the COVID-19 pandemic.

During 2020 and 2021, the Queensland borders were closed to most types of traffic due to the COVID-19 pandemic. Border crossing points were either closed or had a Queensland Police checkpoint to allow entry to those with an appropriate permit. Griffith Street at Coolangatta was one of the police checkpoints, while other crossing points were closed.

== Geography ==
Coolangatta and its immediate neighbouring "Twin Town" Tweed Heads in New South Wales have a shared economy. The Tweed River supports a thriving fishing fleet, and the seafood is a local specialty offered in the restaurants and clubs of the holiday and retirement region on both sides of the state border.

There are three hills in Coolangatta:

- Kirra Hill (28.1679°S 153.5333°E ) at 27 metres (89 ft) above sea level on the coast, which was named in 1883 by surveyor Schneider (1883) using an Aboriginal word which might mean white cockatoo or fire
- Greenmount Hill (28.1652°S 153.5447°E ) at 32 metres (105 ft) above sea level on the coast, which was named for the Greenmount Guest House, operated from 1905 by Patrick J. Fagan, and named after his birthplace in County Meath, Ireland
- Murraba (28.1752°S 153.5313°E ) at 70 metres (230 ft) above sea level on the border with New South Wales

Point Danger is a headland on the Queensland/New South Wales border (28.1641°S 153.5516°E). It was widely believed to be named by Lieutenant James Cook on his 1770 exploration of the eastern Australia coastline in HMS Endeavour, but this is only partially correct. Cook did create the name, but he applied it to another headland further south (now known as Fingal Head). This was confirmed in the 1823 map produced by explorer John Oxley. However a map published in 1831 based on the 1828 survey conducted on HMS Rainbow applied the name Point Danger to the headland north of the Tweed River. So while Cook created the name, he did not assign it to the current location.

Rainbow Bay is offshore from the south-east of the suburb (28.1638°S 153.5470°E). It was originally called Shark/Sharks Bay until 1926 when the Coolangatta Town Council decided to rename it after HMS Rainbow, a sixth-rate frigate, commanded by Captain Henry John Rous, used in surveys of the area in 1828.

There are three neighbourhoods within Coolangatta:

- Kirra (28.1675°S 153.5325°E) which takes its name from Kirra Hill
- Greenmount (28.1658°S 153.5444°E ) named after the guest house
- Rainbow Bay (28.1647°S 153.5477°E ) named after the bay

Point Danger Lighthouse is located on the Point Danger headland (28.1650°S 153.5507°E).

There are three beaches in the suburb, from west to east:

- Kirra Beach (28.1661°S 153.5294°E)
- Coolangatta Beach (28.1667°S 153.5374°E)
- Greenmount Beach (28.1666°S 153.5426°E)

There is a breakwater extending from Kirra Hill in the ocean which protects Coolangatta Beach from erosion (28.1652°S 153.5363°E).

The Gold Coast Airport, formerly known as Coolangatta Airport, is not located within the present suburb boundaries but within neighbouring Bilinga with part of the runway extending across the border into Tweed Heads West in New South Wales.

=== Climate ===
Coolangatta has a humid subtropical climate (Köppen climate classification Cfa) with warm, wet summers and cool, moist winters. Although there is four times as much rainfall in March as there is in September, Coolangatta is still considered to have no dry season because there is more than a tenth of the rainfall of the wettest month in the driest month of the year.

Climate data for Coolangatta
Month	Jan	Feb	Mar	Apr	May	Jun	Jul	Aug	Sep	Oct	Nov	Dec	Year
Record high °C (°F)	35.9 (96.6)	40.0 (104.0)	34.6 (94.3)	32.9 (91.2)	28.8 (83.8)	27.5 (81.5)	29.6 (85.3)	31.7 (89.1)	33.9 (93.0)	35.6 (96.1)	37.9 (100.2)	38.0 (100.4)	40.0 (104.0)
Mean daily maximum °C (°F)	28.6 (83.5)	28.4 (83.1)	27.4 (81.3)	25.5 (77.9)	23.3 (73.9)	21.1 (70.0)	20.8 (69.4)	21.7 (71.1)	23.5 (74.3)	24.7 (76.5)	26.2 (79.2)	27.5 (81.5)	24.9 (76.8)
Mean daily minimum °C (°F)	21.1 (70.0)	21.0 (69.8)	19.8 (67.6)	17.1 (62.8)	13.8 (56.8)	11.5 (52.7)	10.0 (50.0)	10.5 (50.9)	13.4 (56.1)	15.9 (60.6)	18.2 (64.8)	19.8 (67.6)	16.0 (60.8)
Record low °C (°F)	13.5 (56.3)	15.0 (59.0)	12.7 (54.9)	7.3 (45.1)	1.2 (34.2)	0.6 (33.1)	−0.1 (31.8)	0.5 (32.9)	3.0 (37.4)	5.8 (42.4)	9.3 (48.7)	12.2 (54.0)	−0.1 (31.8)
Average precipitation mm (inches)	159.9 (6.30)	196.4 (7.73)	202.7 (7.98)	157.8 (6.21)	129.3 (5.09)	131.6 (5.18)	73.5 (2.89)	54.8 (2.16)	42.6 (1.68)	92.0 (3.62)	115.5 (4.55)	157.5 (6.20)	1,510.7 (59.48)
Average precipitation days	14.7	16.4	18.4	15.7	14.9	13.0	10.2	8.0	8.5	10.5	12.1	13.8	156.2
Average afternoon relative humidity (%)	69	69	67	64	62	60	56	56	61	66	68	68	64
Source: Bureau of Meteorology

== Demographics ==
In the 2016 census, Coolangatta had a population of 5,948 people. Aboriginal and Torres Strait Islander people made up 2.2% of the population. The median age of people in Coolangatta was 50 years. 67.6% of people were born in Australia. The next most common countries of birth were New Zealand 4.3% and England 4.0%. 80.2% of people spoke only English at home. Other languages spoken at home included Portuguese at 1.7%. The most common responses for religion were No Religion 32.3%, Catholic 21.9% and Anglican 15.4%.

In the 2021 census, Coolangatta had a population of 6,491 people.

== Education ==
Coolangatta State School is a government primary (Prep to Year 6) school for boys and girls at Stapylton Street (28.1720°S 153.5287°E). In 2018, the school had an enrolment of 184 students with 19 teachers (14 full-time equivalent) and 11 non-teaching staff (8 full-time equivalent).

There are no secondary schools in Coolangatta. The nearest government secondary school is Palm Beach Currumbin State High School in Palm Beach to the north-west.

The Coolangatta campus of TAFE Queensland is a technical college at 5 Scott Street (28.1705°S 153.5399°E).

== Facilities ==
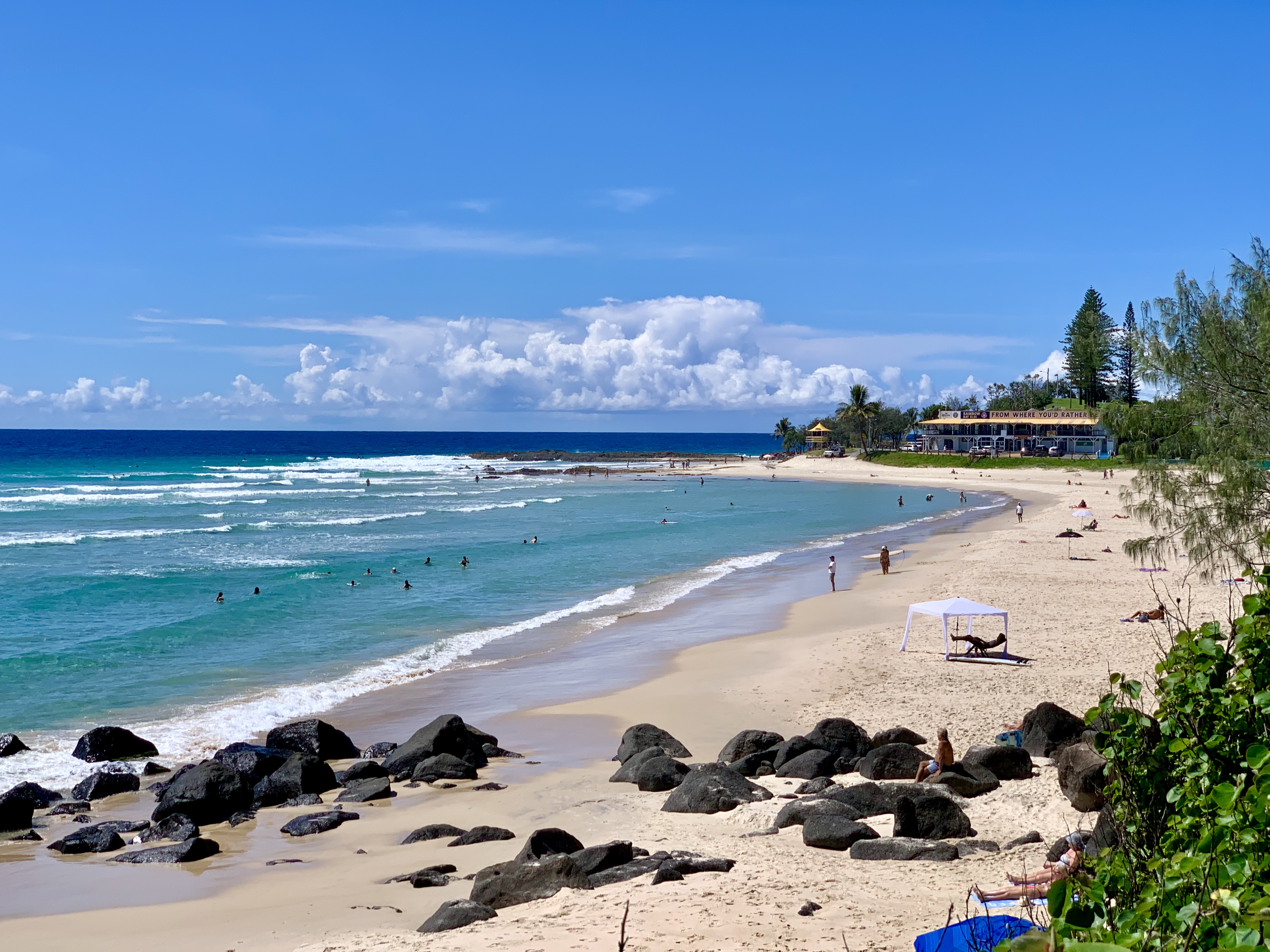
Rainbow Bay seen from Greenmount Hill, Coolangatta

Coolangatta Magistrates Court is at 136 Musgrave Street (28.1689°S 153.5346°E).

Coolangatta Police Station is on the corner of Musgrave and Mclean Streets (28.1689°S 153.5345°E).

== Amenities ==
The Gold Coast City Council operate a public library (28.1675°S 153.5378°E) on Level 1 of the Strand Shopping Centre (between Marine Parade and Griffith Street, 28.1677°S 153.5381°E).

Coolangatta Post Office is at (28.1683°S 153.5356°E).

There are four surf life saving clubs:

- Kirra Surf Life Saving Club is on Kirra Beach (28.1673°S 153.5320°E)
- Coolangatta Surf Life Saving Club is on Coolangatta Beach (28.1669°S 153.5369°E)
- Tweed Heads Coolangatta Surf Life Saving Club (also known as Greenmount Surf Club) is on Greenmount Beach (28.1668°S 153.5445°E)
- Rainbow Bay Surf Life Saving Club is on Rainbow Bay (28.1635°S 153.5487°E)

The Coolangatta branch of the Queensland Country Women's Association meets at their hall at 169 Griffith Street (28.1680°S 153.5431°E).

St Augustine's Catholic Church is on the corner of Mclean and Tweed Streets (28.1708°S 153.5351°E).

Twin Towns Coolangatta Uniting Church is at 26–28 Lanham Street (corner of McLean Street, 28.1693°S 153.5356°E).

== Sport ==
The Coolangatta Surf Life Saving Club compete in the Winter Swimming Association of Australia Championships.

Coolangatta Bowls Club is on the corner of Scott and Warner Streets (28.1698°S 153.5390°E).

Coolangatta Croquet Club is at 42 Lanham Street (28.1696°S 153.5372°E).

The Coolangatta & Tweed Heads Golf Club is at Soorley Street in Tweed Heads South.

== Events ==
Coolangatta hosts a number of sporting events: The Coolangatta Gold (surf life saving), Quiksilver Pro Gold Coast (surfing), Roxy Pro Gold Coast (surfing), and Beach Cricket Tri-Nations series (beach cricket).

Each June, Coolangatta hosts the Cooly Rocks On Festival, a two-week 1950s and 1960s nostalgia festival with free entertainment and attractions, including hot rods, restored cars and revival bands playing music of the era.

Billy cart races have been organised on Boundary Street in Coolangatta, with the most recent occurrences of these organised in association with the Cooly Rocks On Festival.

== Attractions ==
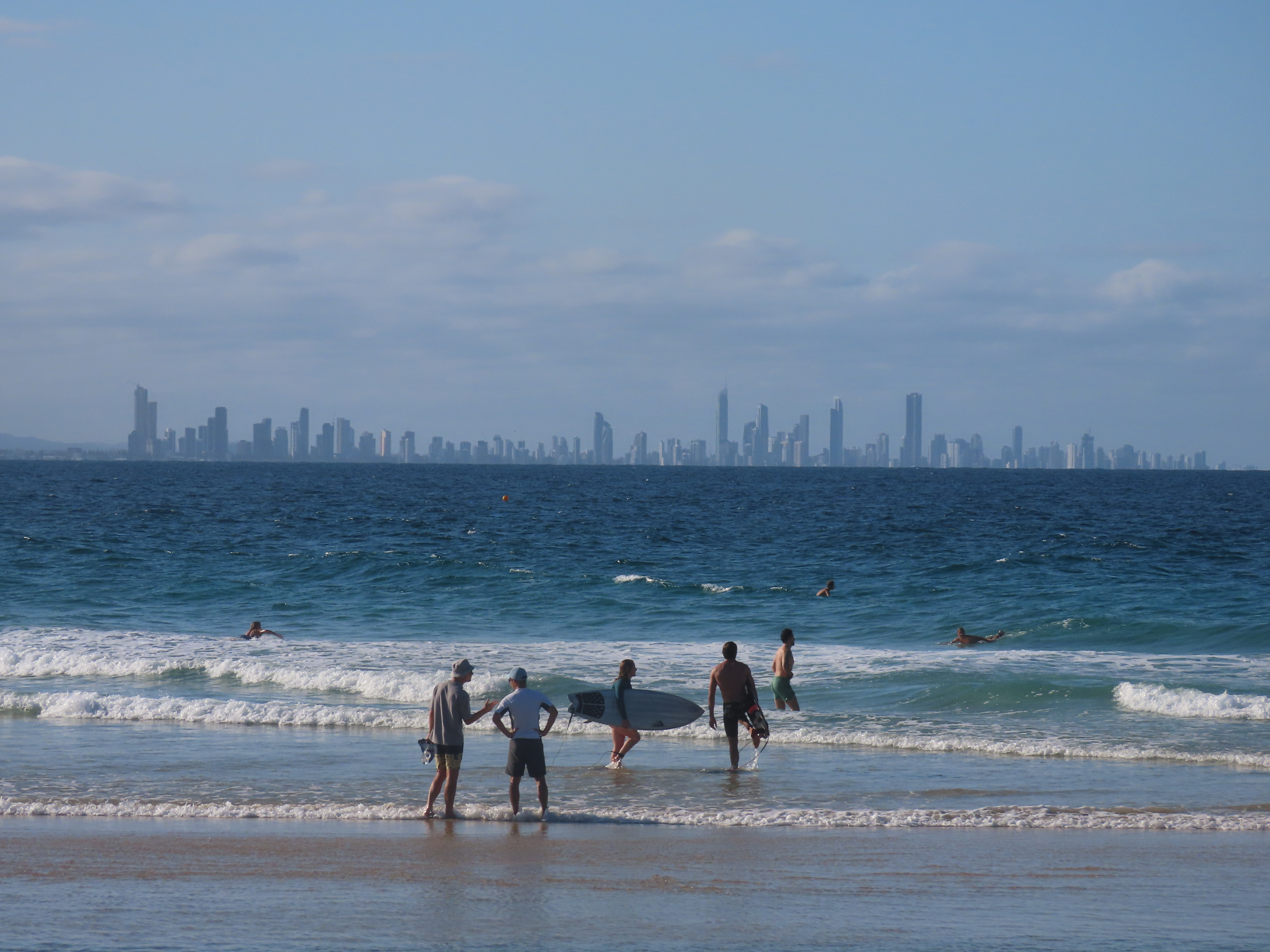
Rainbow Bay Beach with Goldcoast skyline

The beaches are major attractions of Coolangatta. Popular lookouts and viewpoints include:

- Kirra Hill
- Greenmount Hill
- Snapper Rocks (28.1622°S 153.5500°E ), named after HM Colonial Cutter Snapper which passed by Point Danger in July 1822 under the command of W.L. Edwardson
- Point Danger Lighthouse
- Kirra Beach Pavilion on Marine Parade (28.1665°S 153.5335°E)
- Razorback Lookout on Razorback Road in neighbouring Tweed Heads (28.1809°S 153.5352°E)

== Heritage listings ==
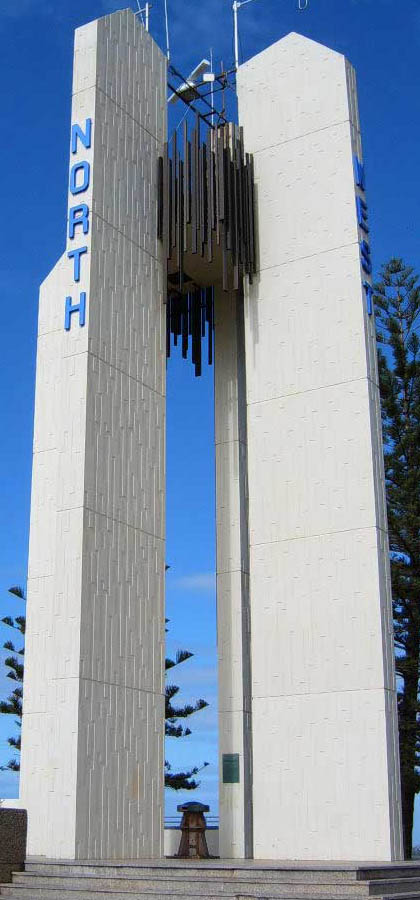
Lighthouse at Point Danger, Coolangatta, Queensland – a heritage-listed memorial to Lieutenant James Cook of HM Bark Endeavour who named the Point and described the area during the voyage of 1770.

There are a number of heritage sites in Coolangatta, including:

- Captain Cook Memorial and Lighthouse, Boundary Street (New South Wales border)
- Francis Edward Roberts Commemorative Plaque, Boundary Street (median strip)
- Powell Brothers Commemorative Trees, Garrick Street (median strip to north of Musgrave Street)
- former Coolangatta State & Special School, 1 Garrick Street
- Coolangatta War Memorial, Lanham Street (Godwin Park)
- Kirra Beach Pavilion, Marine Parade (Kirra Beach)
- Kirra Shelter Shed, Marine Parade (Kirra Beach road reserve)
- ANZAC Memorial, Marine Parade (Queen Elizabeth Park)
- Wreck of the Coolangatta Fragment, Marine Parade (Queen Elizabeth Park)
- Norfolk Pines Coolangatta Foreshore, Marine Parade (Queen Elizabeth Park and Pat Fagan Park)
- United States Navy Coolangatta Leave Area Greenmount Hill Camp No. 4 Picnic Shelter, Marine Parade (Pat Fagan Park, Greenmount Hill)
- Tweed Heads and Coolangatta Surf Life Saving Club (formerly Greenmount Surf Life Saving Club), Marine Parade (28.1667°S 153.5445°E)
- former Jazzland Dance Hall, 31–33 Mclean Street (28.1680°S 153.5352°E)
- St Augustine's Church, 58 McLean Street
- Site of the Wreck of the Coolangatta, Mouth of Coolangatta Creek, North Kirra Beach
- Remains of Jack Evans Porpoise Pool, Snapper Rocks (28.1626°S 153.5501°E)

== In popular culture ==
Coolangatta is featured in the song It's Hot in Brisbane but it's Coolangatta, recorded in 1953 by Gwen Ryan, Claude Carnell's Orchestra and additional vocals from Doug Roughton's Hokey Pokey Club. Funded by 39 businesses, it is believed to be the first jingle written to promote an Australian tourist destination. In 2008 the song was used as the theme for a Gold Coast Heritage exhibition about the 1950s, 1960s and 1970s on the Gold Coast, featuring oral histories and objects of Gold Coast residents.

The sport-romance film The Coolangatta Gold was set in the town.

Coolangatta was also used as the fictitious town of Porpoise Spit in the 1994 film Muriel's Wedding.
