= Cyclone Seth =

Australian tropical cyclone in 2021 and 2022

Tropical Cyclone Seth
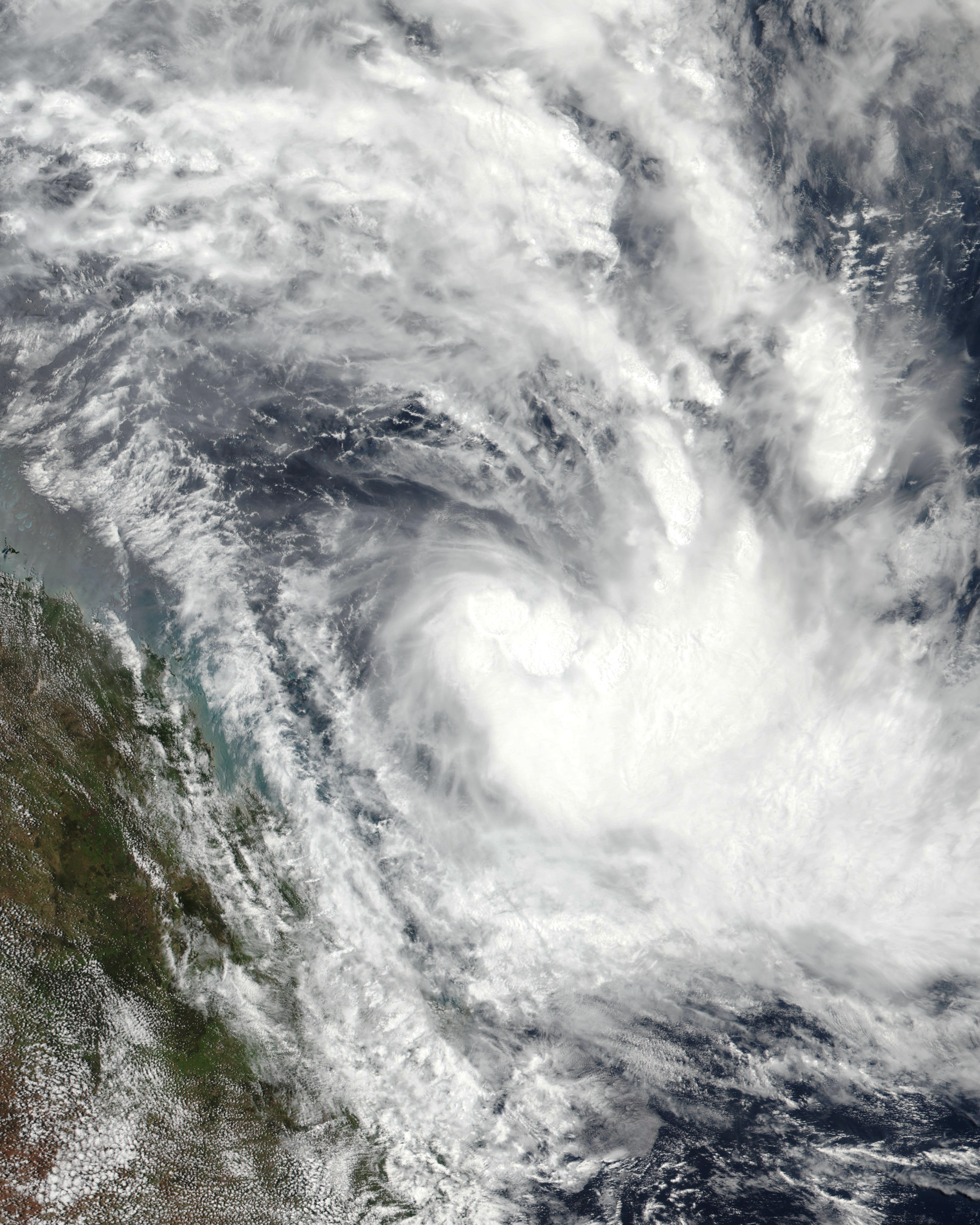
- Cyclone Seth nearing peak intensity on 31 December

Meteorological history
- Formed: 23 December 2021
- Subtropical: 2 January 2022
- Dissipated: 7 January 2022

Category 2 tropical cyclone
- 10-minute sustained (BOM)
- Highest winds: 100 km/h (65 mph)
- Lowest pressure: 982 hPa (mbar); 29.00 inHg

Tropical storm
- 1-minute sustained (SSHWS/JTWC)
- Highest winds: 100 km/h (65 mph)
- Lowest pressure: 988 hPa (mbar); 29.18 inHg

Overall effects
- Fatalities: 5
- Damage: $80 million (2022 USD)
- Areas affected: Northern Territory, Queensland, New South Wales
- Part of the 2021–22 Australian region cyclone season

Tropical Cyclone Seth was a strong tropical cyclone whose main impacts came after it degenerated into a remnant low. The eighth tropical low and the fourth tropical cyclone of the 2021–22 Australian region cyclone season, Seth originated from a tropical disturbance in the Timor Sea and caused severe flooding in southeast Queensland and hazardous surf along the southeastern coast of Australia.

Overall, Seth caused 4 fatalities, 2 each in Queensland and New South Wales. Damage from the storm totaled $80 million (2022 USD). Due to the damage caused by Seth in Queensland and New South Wales, the name Seth was retired and replaced with Stafford.

== Meteorological history ==
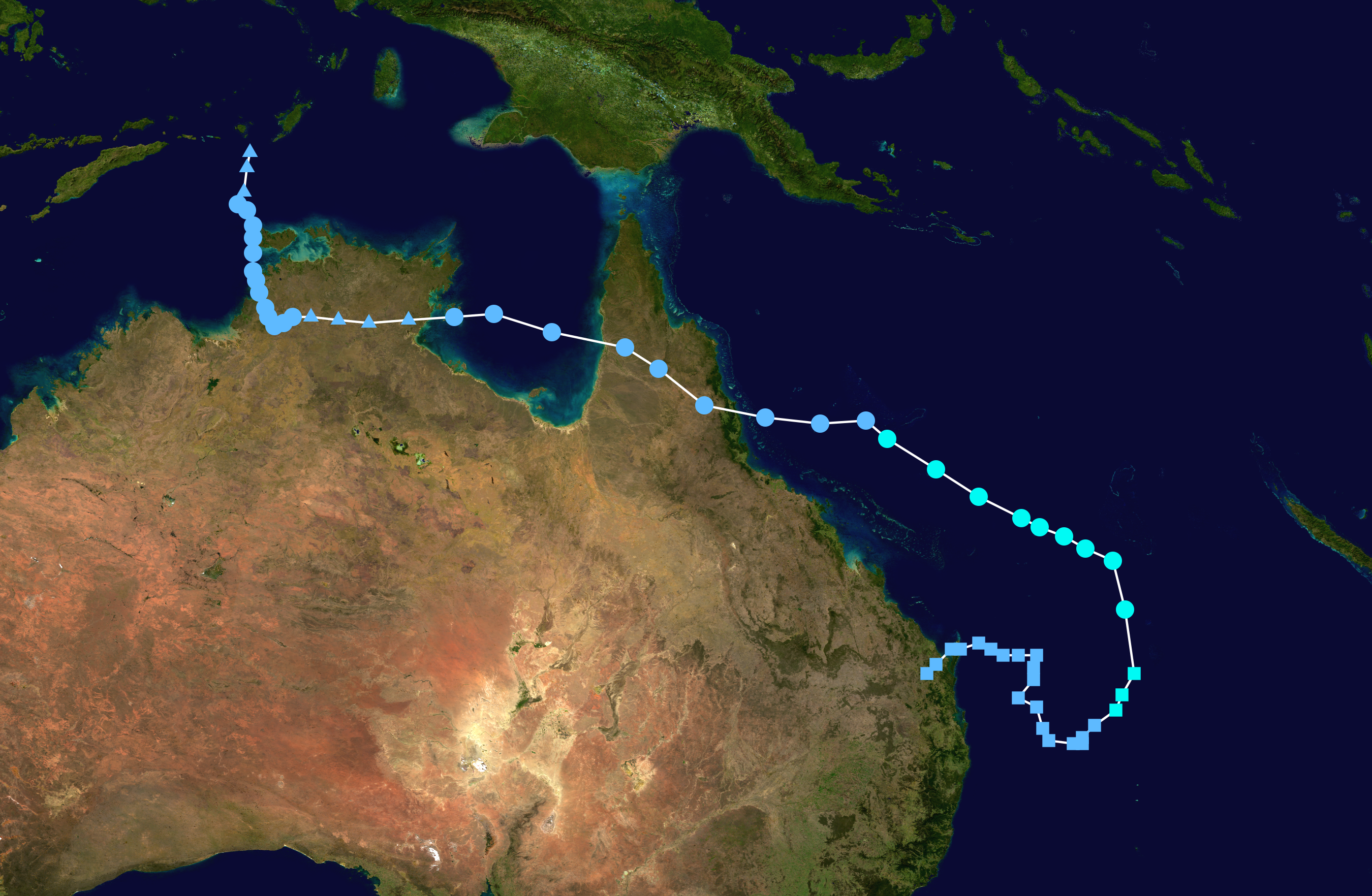
Map plotting the storm's track and intensity, according to the Saffir–Simpson scale Map key Saffir–Simpson scale Tropical depression (≤38 mph, ≤62 km/h) Tropical storm (39–73 mph, 63–118 km/h) Category 1 (74–95 mph, 119–153 km/h) Category 2 (96–110 mph, 154–177 km/h) Category 3 (111–129 mph, 178–208 km/h) Category 4 (130–156 mph, 209–251 km/h) Category 5 (≥157 mph, ≥252 km/h) Unknown Storm type Tropical cyclone Subtropical cyclone Extratropical cyclone, remnant low, tropical disturbance, or monsoon depression

On 21 December, the Bureau of Meteorology (BoM) began to monitor the northern Arafura Sea and Timor Sea for possible development of a tropical low. Two days later, the tropical low formed within a monsoon trough of low pressure over the eastern Timor Sea, with the BoM designating it as Tropical Low 08U. The agency initially gave 08U a moderate chance of development into a tropical cyclone in the next 3 days. At 00:30 UTC on 24 December, the Joint Typhoon Warning Center (JTWC) started to monitor the low, giving the unofficial designation Invest 97S and a low chance of development within the next 24 hours. At that time, broad and flaring convection was surrounding the low's partially exposed low-level circulation center, and was within a favorable environment of 30–31 °C (86–88 °F) sea surface temperatures, low to moderate vertical wind shear, and strong poleward and equatorial outflow aloft. The BoM then increased 08U's chances of development into high at 04:30 UTC. The JTWC followed suit, and upgraded the low's chances of development into medium at 14:30 UTC, before subsequently increasing it into high with the issuance of a Tropical Cyclone Formation Alert (TCFA) at 21:00 UTC that same day, noting the low's consolidating center and deep convection to its southern quadrant. However, by 18:30 UTC the next day, the JTWC cancelled the TCFA as 08U moved over the western Top End region of Australia. The BoM then decreased the low's chances of development into medium by 26 December. As it moved east-southeast, it emerged into the Gulf of Carpentaria by the next day, while becoming elongated. The JTWC then upgraded 08U's chances of development into medium as it moved over the Gulf. The system later moved inland over the Cape York Peninsula, before entering the Coral Sea on 30 December.

Upon entering the Coral Sea, the JTWC re-issued its TCFA at 02:30 UTC, as 08U was consolidating under an environment of warm sea surface temperatures, lowering wind shear, and a developing anticyclone providing improved equatorial and poleward outflow. The system was also positioned near a monsoonal flow to its north that was producing near gale-force winds, and strong southeasterlies between its broad circulation and land, which aided its development. Gale-force winds were briefly reported at Holmes Reef later that same day, however, deep convection was not organized enough for the BoM to upgrade 08U into a tropical cyclone. By 00:00 UTC the next day, the tropical low intensified into a category 1 tropical cyclone in the Australian scale, with the BoM naming it as Seth. The JTWC later canceled its TCFA again, and classified Seth as a subtropical cyclone, due to the storm possessing both tropical and mid-latitude cyclone characteristics. Seth then intensified into a Category 2 tropical cyclone six hours later. The JTWC started issuing advisories on the storm at 15:00 UTC that same day, noting that the storm transitioned into a well-defined tropical cyclone, with deep convection surrounding its center. Around the same time, the BoM reported that Seth reached peak intensity, with maximum 10-minute sustained winds of 55 knots (102 km/h; 63 mph). The storm would later weaken into a Category 1 tropical cyclone, as it became elongated due to a dry air intrusion and strong northwesterly wind shear.

As Seth moved south under a mid-latitude upper low, it became strongly influenced by the low and started to exhibit subtropical characteristics, prompting the BoM to reclsssify the storm as ex-tropical cyclone at 06:00 UTC on 1 January. The JTWC followed suit, reclassifying the storm as a subtropical cyclone. By the next day, the BoM reclassified Seth as a subtropical low, as convection was still confined to the south of its broad center. As the steering influence became weak, the low moved slowly northwest for the next few days, before turning west on 6 January and crossing over the Queensland coast by the next day and dissipating overland.

== Preparations and impact ==
As Seth's precursor low was forming in the Timor Sea, cyclone warnings were issued in parts of the Northern Territory, including the city of Darwin. It brought heavy rain on the region and later on northern Queensland. The city recorded a minimum temperature of 27.3 °C (81.1 °F) on 25 December, making it the "coolest Christmas Day on record". The highest recorded rainfall in the Northern Territory was reported at Thorak Cemetery on 29 December, with 242 millimetres (9.5 in) of rain recorded over the day, as well as Kowanyama in northern Queensland with 235.2 millimetres (9.26 in) of rain being recorded at the same day.

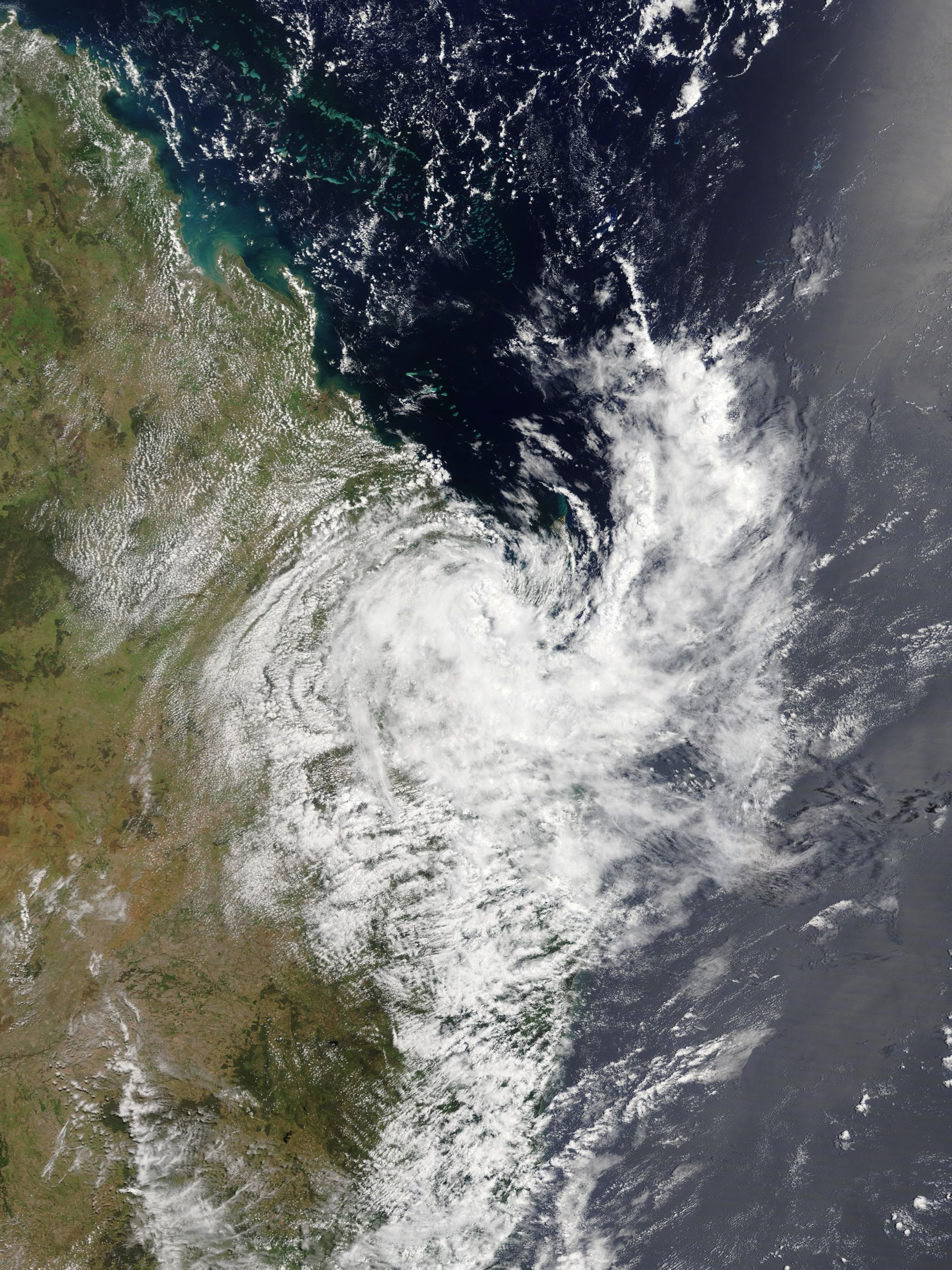
The remnants of Seth over Queensland on 7 January

The remnants of Seth caused major damage in Southern Australia, resulting in 5 fatalities. Many beaches were closed in preparation for Seth. Low-level flood warnings were issued due to Seth. A 47-year-old woman drowned off the coast of New South Wales. Tens of hundreds of rescues were necessary according to lifeguards. Erosion was reported along the coast of New South Wales. Two emergency calls near Arrawarra. Hazardous conditions were reported as south as Sydney and Illawarra. One man died after being blown off of a rock by strong winds and drowning on Windang Island. Eight children were rescued after a massive swell turned a calm estuary into deep, fast-moving waters. Another man died after being pulled unconscious due to strong surf. A large swell exposed many unexposed beaches, and further erosion was reported. Many roads and sidewalks suffered damage. Dangerous swell and high tides washed away hundreds of turtle nests before they were due to hatch. Waves in Kirra, Queensland were very high.

As the remnants of the cyclone moved inland into southeast Queensland, heavy rainfall inundated areas of the Wide Bay-Burnett, Fraser Coast Region and Gympie Region. Emergency alerts were issued in Goomeri, Kilkivan and Woolooga due to significant flooding. A 22-year old man was found dead in his car which was submerged in floodwaters. Four people were rescued from the floods. A 14-year old girl was reported missing after being swept away by the flood. Her 53-year old father was rescued after being located to be clinging to a tree. Widespread rainfall totals of 150–230 millimetres (5.9–9.1 in) were recorded across the Mary River as well as parts of the Burnett River. In the hills to the north-west of Gympie, 400–674 millimetres (15.7–26.5 in) was recorded by the BoM's rain gauges. In these areas, the 24-hour totals exceeded records set by Cyclone Oswald in January 2013. There were some anecdotal reports of falls exceeding 800 millimetres (31 in). The highest official rainfall reported was in Marodian, with 674 millimetres (26.5 in). Damage from Seth totaled over US$80 million.

== Retirement ==
Due to its impacts on New South Wales and Queensland, the name Seth was retired after the 2021–22 season. It was replaced with Stafford.

== See also ==
- Tropical cyclones in 2021
- Weather of 2021
- Cyclone Tiffany
- Cyclone Oswald
- Floods in Australia
