= Thora, New South Wales =

Locality in New South Wales, Australia

Thora is a small locality around halfway between the towns of Dorrigo and Bellingen on the Waterfall Way in Northern New South Wales, Australia. It is situated on the banks of the Bellinger River, is around 40 kilometres from the coast and is at the very bottom of the climb to the top of Dorrigo Mountain, the bottom of the Great Dividing Range and near the eastern edge of Dorrigo National Park. The Bellinger River is subject to major flooding, but the township is rarely affected by flooding but downstream floodplain becomes affected, including the town of Bellingen.

There are no residences in Thora, but small farms dot the landscape around it. There is a post office and petrol station at its general store.
