= Coolangatta Chronicle =

Australian weekly newspaper

The Coolangatta Chronicle was a weekly newspaper printed and published between 1924 and 1927 by Crampton and Co. in Maclean Street Coolangatta, Queensland, Australia, on the border of Tweed Heads, New South Wales. It was one of the early, but short lived, publications written for the residents of the region that would later be known as the Gold Coast, Queensland.

== History ==
The Coolangatta Chronicle was started by George Stradford Crampton and William Francis Higgins in early 1924. Both men had previous experience in the newspaper industry from outside the region. For the first three months the Coolangatta Chronicle was a free paper that was supported by advertising but from 7 July 1924 readers were charged a penny to buy the publication. In 1926 Crampton sold his interest in the newspaper and left the region to take up a position at the Brisbane Telegraph.

On 8 September 1926 the publication was formally acquired in its entirety by Crampton's business partner, Higgins, who had been involved in newspapers in the Dalby region. In 1927 the Coolangatta Chronicle was purchased by the Tweed Heads and Coolangatta Newspapers Ltd and was amalgamated with the Tweed Heads and Coolangatta Star, which was in its thirteenth year of operation.

The newly united publications underwent a name change and became the Border Star, which was issued twice a week. Higgins, the sole proprietor of the Coolangatta Chronicle became the managing editor of the newly amalgamated publication while W. A. Morley of Tweed Heads was the chairman.

== Digitisation ==
The paper has been partially digitised as part of the Australian Newspapers Digitisation Program of the National Library of Australia.

== See also ==
- List of newspapers in Australia
