= 2022 south eastern Australia floods =

Major floods in Victoria, Tasmania and New South Wales

- Date: October 2022-January 2023
- Location: Victoria, Tasmania, north western and southern New South Wales, South Australia
- Deaths: 7

A series of floods occurred in the Australian states of Victoria, Tasmania, New South Wales and South Australia. beginning in October 2022. Some towns experienced the highest river peaks in decades, and many places saw rivers peak multiple times. The floods were attributed to excess torrential rain caused by La Niña and a negative Indian Ocean Dipole.

In Victoria, the Campaspe River, Maribyrnong River, Avoca River, Goulburn River, Loddon River and Broken River all flooded their banks. In New South Wales, the Lachlan River caused major flooding in Forbes and the Murrumbidgee River at Wagga Wagga caused problems. In Tasmania, the Mersey River, Meander River and Macquarie River saw water levels reach major flood levels. With the exception of the Maribyrnong River, the aforementioned Victoria and NSW rivers flow into the Murray River, which caused flooding downstream in North-Western Victoria and South Australia in November and December, and into January.

The floods were expected to reduce Australia's economic growth and increase inflation. According to the Insurance Council of Australia, the NSW floods were the nation's costliest natural disaster on record, with over $5.5 billion in claims. A report by the Victorian Council of Social Services found that the communities in Victoria exposed to the flood had an estimated $22,818 drop in household income and saw an increase in unemployment and poverty in 2023.

== Meteorology ==
Lower temperatures leading to lower evaporation rates and wetter conditions in September left the ground saturated. The La Nina weather cycles is also to blame for excess rainfall in Eastern Australia. A positive Southern Annular Mode and negative Indian Ocean Dipole also favoured wet conditions. A band of clouds formed at the beginning of the week, leading to downpours on Thursday 13 October and Friday the 14th. Many rivers were already swollen from rainfall in the past few weeks.

Strathbogie topped the Victorian charts, receiving 220 mm of rainfall in a 24-hour period, marking more than twice October's average. Charnwood received 209 mm. In Tasmania, up to 400 mm fell in one day.

On 24 October, Renmark received 95.6 mm of rain, making it the wettest day ever recorded with records dating back to 1889.

== Impact ==
- Satellite imagery showing Rochester before and after

=== Victoria ===
In Victoria, thousands of homes were inundated or isolated by floodwaters, leading to declarations of a state of disaster. Australian Defence Force personnel were deployed to fill and move sandbags. Evacuations were ordered in several towns, including Seymour, Rochester, Carisbrook, Wedderburn and Charlton. On Friday 14 October, the State Emergency Service (SES) conducted more than 200 flood rescues. 146 flood rescues were made the following day. At one point around 4,700 homes were without power and 344 roads were closed. A 71-year-old man was found dead in floodwaters in his backyard in Rochester. It was estimated that 85% of the homes in Rochester were inundated.

By Sunday 16 October, attention was focused on Shepparton where a major sandbagging operation was undertaken. Flood waters moved downstream to Chartlon and Echuca where evacuation orders were announced. Echuca residents face two threats, first floodwaters from the Campaspe River and then from the Murray River.

A 2.5-kilometre dirt levee was built at Echuca to keep the Murray River out of homes and businesses. In the Victorian council areas of Campaspe, Greater Shepparton, Maribyrnong, Mitchell and Strathbogie, the federal government made a one-off, non-means tested disaster recovery payment of $1,000 per eligible adult and $400 per eligible child available. Across the states suffering in the crisis, 23 local government areas were made eligible. Displaced people were able to seek shelter at the former quarantine facility in Mickleham.

=== Tasmania ===
Flooding affected Latrobe where work had commenced on flood mitigation measures after significant flooding in 2016, however the work was not at a stage to offer any further protection at the time of the flooding.

The Tasmanian town of Deloraine was particularly hard hit. Evacuation orders were first issued on 13 October for the town of Meander. The Tasmanian SES was responding to calls for help on the same day.

On 13 November the Central Coast Council estimated that the cost of repairing damage within their region would exceed $2 million.

=== New South Wales ===
On 21 October, dozens of evacuation orders were made with 48 flood warnings active, as the flooding crisis continued in the south of the Murray–Darling basin. More than a week into the disaster, 8,300 calls for help were made to the SES; 40,000 potholes were fixed.

Another death was reported on 24 October when a woman's body was found on the bank of a river near Gulgong, New South Wales.

Widespread rain and storms spread across NSW, and Victoria, causing more major flooding for river systems. The Mehi River at Moree caused 4,000 residents to be evacuated and reached a peak level of 10.5 metres, with the town receiving 107.8 mm of rain on 21 October. Other towns such as Narrabri, Gunnedah and Barraba have experienced rapid major flood levels.

The Wyangala Dam overflowed with a record 230,000 megalitres per day. By 14 November, flooding along the Lachlan River forced the evacuation of Forbes. Over 220 people were rescued by the SES over the 24 hour period, but a full assessment had not yet been competed. Up to 80% of homes in the town of Eugowra were flood damaged. Flash flooding affected the town of Molong's central business district, cutting the Mitchell Highway and flooding the only supermarket in town.

An international team of flood rescue experts arrived in mid November from New Zealand and Singapore to relive fatigued NSW emergency service crews.

=== South Australia ===
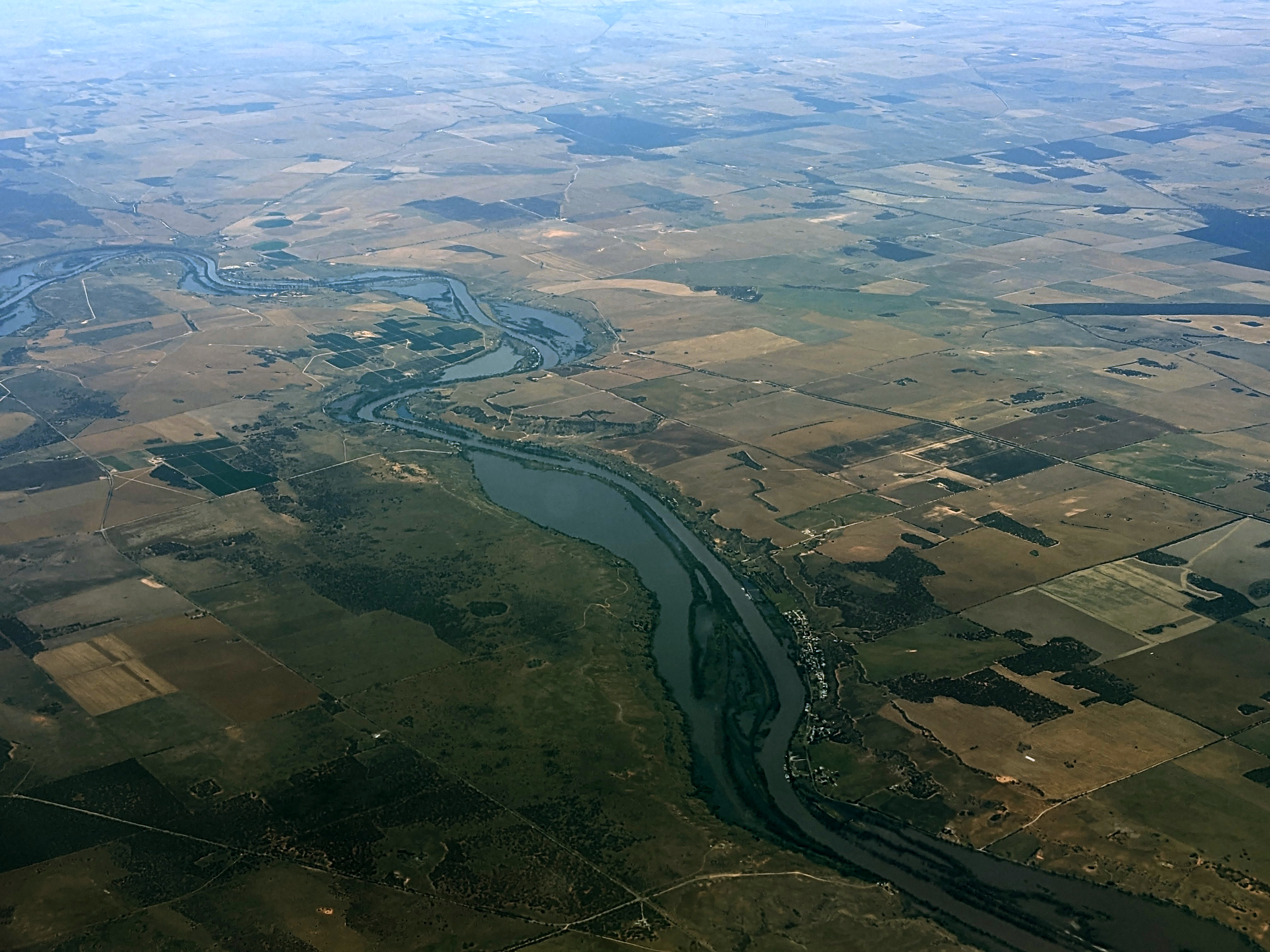
The River Murray photographed from the air on 4 December 2022, looking towards Bowhill. The river's water level increased significantly due to high flows from upstream.

Preparations for anticipated flooding in South Australia began in October. The forecast peak Murray River flows in South Australia were gradually revised during October to December. On 21 October it was forecast to peak at 120 gigalitres per day in early December. On 3 November this was revised to 135 to 150 gigalitres per day in late December and early January; and on 17 November it was revised again, to 175 to 220 gigalitres per day. By mid December the forecast was 190 to 220 gigalitres per day, making it the highest flood level since the 1956 Murray River flood, which peaked at 341 gigalitres per day.

At Renmark, the peak was estimated to be 185 to 190 gigalitres per day, and to have occurred on 27 December. By this time, 1700 to 1800 South Australian properties had been flooded, and about one levee per day was being breached by the rising waters.

== See also ==
- Weather of 2022
- Extreme weather events in Melbourne
- 2022 Australian Rainfall Records
