= Kirra, Queensland =

Kirra
- Suburb
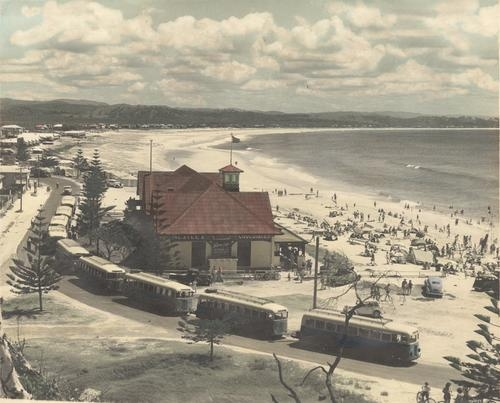
- Kirra Surf Life Saving Club, Circa 1946

- Coordinates: 28.1675°S 153.5325°E
- Country: Australia
- State: Queensland
- City: Gold Coast
- LGA: City of Gold Coast

Government
  - State electorate: Currumbin
  - Federal division: McPherson
- Postcode: 4225

Kirra is a beach-side neighbourhood within the suburb of Coolangatta in the City of Gold Coast, Queensland, Australia.

== Geography ==
The small rocky headland Kirra Point separates Kirra Beach to the north and Coolangatta Beach to the south, and is noted as one of the world's premier surf breaks. In the past the surf break was known for producing high quality barrels. Today sand pumping across the Tweed River mouth has filled it in and changed its character.

== History ==
The name of the neighbourhood comes from Kirra Hill (28.1681°S 153.5333°E) which is 27 metres (89 ft) above sea level, which first appears on an 1883 survey plan by surveyor Mr Schneider. Although believed to be an Indigenous name, the specific language and meaning is unknown. For example, in the Yuggera language, kaiyar means white cockatoo while in the Kabi language kirran means fire.

Prior to 1840, Kirra is not known by its current name and is rarely visited by white settlers.

From 1840 to 1910, the first white holiday-makers start to visit.

From 1910 to 1920, holiday-makers increase, making Kirra a popular recreational beach area.

In April 1914, on what is now known as Kirra, 18 residential and business sites were advertised to be auctioned by Fred Nash at the Tweed Heads Hall. A map advertising the auction states the sites at Coolangatta faced the Esplanade, now Musgrave Street located near a probable site for a railway siding.

In the 1930s, the opening of the South Coast Road increases the popularity of the southern Gold Coast as a holiday destination. Camping was very popular for families because Kirra had a long beach and a low-lying dune system.

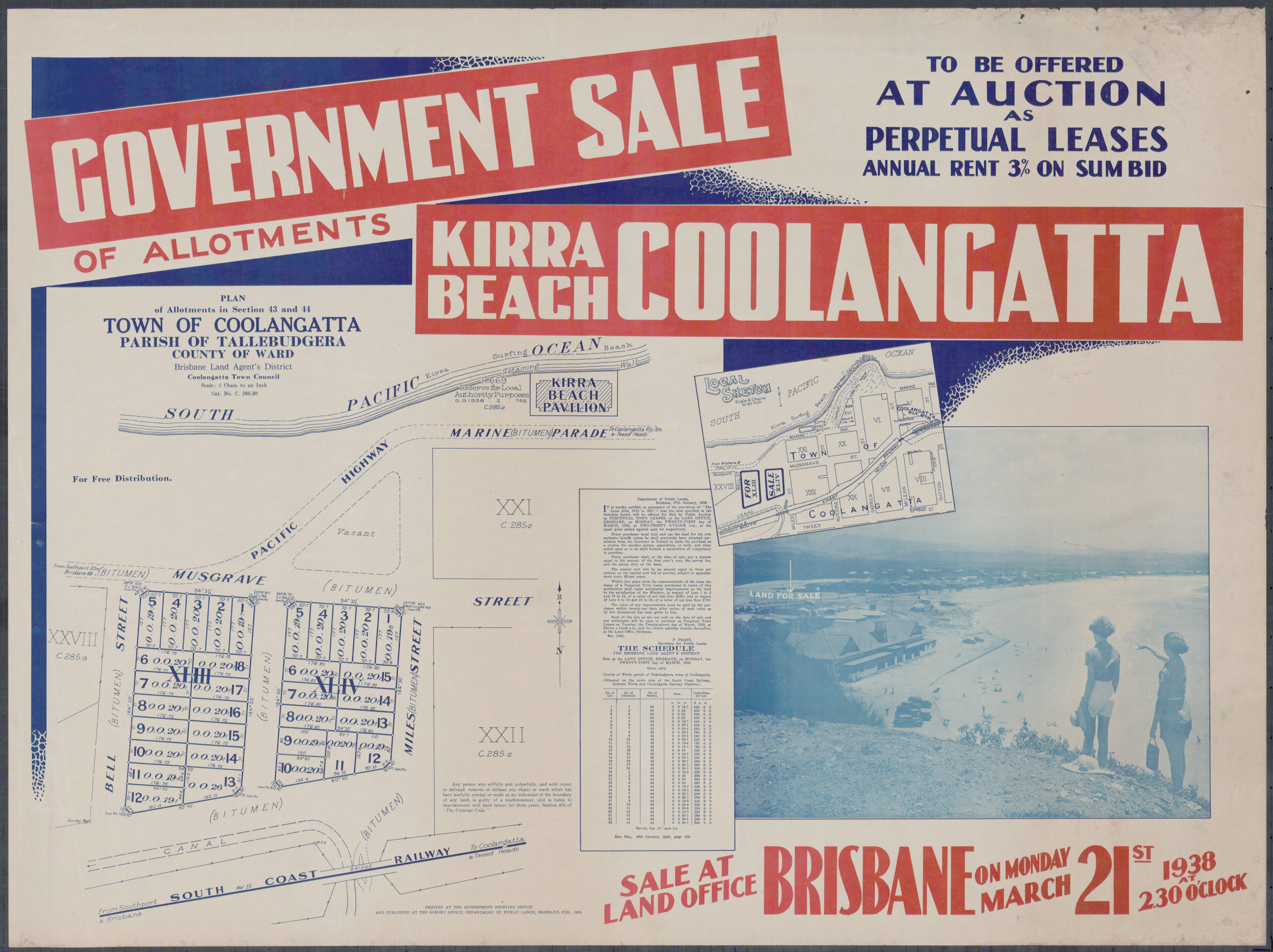
1938 land sale at Kirra Beach, 1938

In 1938, the Queensland Government sells reclaimed swamp land at Kirra.

From 1960 to early 1974, the Tweed River breakwaters combine with a series of low-pressure weather systems to result in serious sand erosion. This brings the high-water level to just below the coastal road.

In May 1972, the Government of Queensland built a groyne, now called "big groyne", extending Kirra Point, to trap sand on Coolangatta beach to the south. The growing tourist industry there relied on sandy beaches and the Coolangatta stretch had been plagued by erosion problems. Surfers were against the plan, believing it would kill the break, and they held protest meetings. They were right about its effect on the surf, for the following year a deep hole formed off the groyne. But after that first year the sand returned and it broke as well as ever.

A second smaller barrier, called "little groyne" was later built a short distance north on Kirra beach. In 1995 30 metres was taken off Big Groyne to help fight erosion at Greenmount Beach. Both groynes have been almost completely covered by sand from the sand pumping.

In 2001, the Tweed River sand bypass project commenced

By 2003, Little Groyne was completely buried in sand.

In 2006, Griffith University Coastal Management Center launch a project to restore the beach.

== Environment ==
There have been environmental effects of the sand pumping on the reef. A popular diving area with sea-life including manta rays and wobbegongs has been buried over since the pumping started. Dive companies have relocated or turned their focus to other smaller reef areas. The sand pumping contract held on the area is in place until 2024, when the contract will be re-evaluated.
