= Dorrigo Mountain =

Mountain in Australia

- Dorrigo Escarpment; Dorrigo Plateau
- Location within New South Wales
- Elevation: 762 metres (2,500 ft)

Third Approach
- Location: Northern Tablelands region, New South Wales, Australia
- Range: Great Dividing Range
- Coordinates: 30°23′S 152°44′E
- Topo map: Dorrigo 9437 (1:100000)

Dorrigo Mountain, a mountain on the Great Dividing Range, is located in the Northern Tablelands region of New South Wales, Australia.

With an elevation of 762 metres (2,500 ft) above sea level, Dorrigo Mountain is located about 3 kilometres (1.9 mi) east of the town of Dorrigo. It is between Dorrigo National Park and Bellinger River National Park.

There is one road that accesses the top of Dorrigo mountain which is the Waterfall Way but the summit is accessible from either direction though the Waterfall Way can close from the east due to flooding and landslides. From the east, the road has a 15 kilometres (9.3 mi) climb to the top of Dorrigo Mountain. There are also a number of lookouts on top of Dorrigo Mountain into the Bellinger Valley.

== See also ==
- List of mountains of Australia § New South Wales
