= 1950 Australian rainfall records =

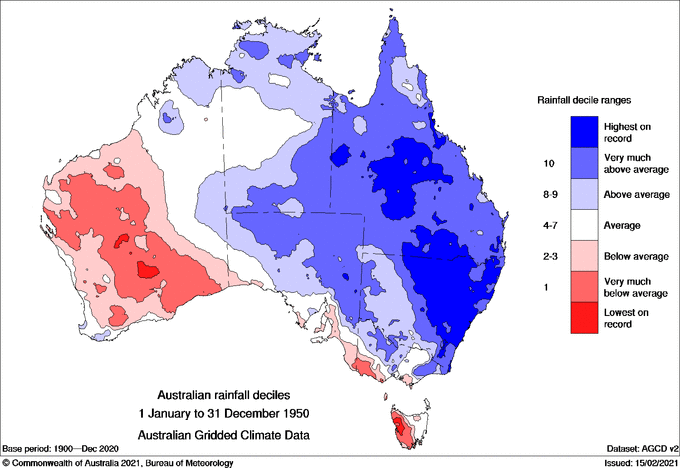
The rainfall deciles for 1950, with higher values representing above average rain.

The 1950 rainfall records for the Australian states of New South Wales and Queensland reported probably the most remarkable record high rainfall totals ever recorded anywhere in the continent. Averaged over both of these states, 1950 is clearly the wettest year since adequate records became available circa 1885. Queensland recorded a statewide average rainfall of around 1,125 millimetres (44.3 in) as against a mean since 1885 of around 640 millimetres (25.2 in), whilst New South Wales recorded around 930 millimetres (36.6 in) as against an instrumental mean around 520 millimetres (20.5 in). Australia's wettest town, Tully also recorded its highest annual rainfall total in 1950 with 7,925 millimetres (312.0 in).

== Evolution and causes of the abnormal rainfall ==
=== First four months ===
The year 1950 opened quite quietly over Australia, with a relatively inactive monsoon and generally very cool conditions further south. A major cyclone in the third week of January gave substantial rain to most of New South Wales and caused high winds that killed seven people, but it was not until February that the pattern of abnormal rainfall over NSW and Queensland became firmly established.

Especially heavy rainfall occurred over the southwest of New South Wales (extending into most of Victoria) during February, but it was in March, normally at the end of the wet season, that the heaviest rainfall occurred. The monsoon trough, which is normally situated around Cape York Peninsula, moved to a latitude near Boulia. At the beginning of that month some of the worst flooding on record occurred over the Barron and Herbert Rivers, and with a major tropical cyclone following the contour of the Queensland coast for over a week from 4 to 11 March and then moving inland, the heavy rain extended deep into the interior of Queensland and even to that part of South Australia northeast of the Flinders Ranges. The flood on the Diamantina River was measured as the highest ever recorded, and Windorah on the lower Cooper recorded for the entire month 442 millimetres (17.4 in), which is about 145 percent of its mean annual rainfall. Most pastoral areas were described as having a "superabundance of feed" and losses of sheep in the Lake Eyre Basin due to blowfly strike were as serious as experienced in the frequent droughts characteristic of the basin's extraordinarily variable climate.

With the interaction with a cold front mid-month, the heavy rainfall shifted southward to the Murrumbidgee River basin. In three days, Canberra received 150 millimetres (6 in) and the heavy rain continued over southeastern New South Wales and adjacent Victoria until the end of the month. Major flooding – unusual for this time of year – occurred on all rivers draining from the Australian Alps and over the South Coast. By the time the rain eased after further heavy falls early in April, Canberra had had its second wettest month on record. Over the North Coast up to Brisbane and inland to the Darling Downs, however, March rainfall had been below normal.

In these regions, however, the moist easterly flow of March continued to bring heavy rainfall later in April; however, in much of western and far southern New South Wales April was very dry. The continuing rain, aided by falls near Lake Eyre that prevented the rivers drying up, allowed the lake to begin filling during that month to the astonishment of many people who had seen the lake during the dry era from 1922 to 1938 and concluded that the lake could never fill with water.

=== Second four months ===
May and the first week of June saw a relatively typical winter circulation over most parts of Australia. However, the tendency of strong frontal depressions to move inland combined with generally weak anticyclones meant that temperatures were generally mild, whilst a major low pressure system off the south coast gave that region further flooding rains.

From the second week of June to the end of winter, the weather patterns became quite unusual. Strong high-pressure systems over Tasmania and Victoria were virtually constant and allowed moist easterly air to flow consistently over New South Wales and Queensland. Combined with a series of upper-level lows lifting the moisture, this caused remarkably heavy rain except over the extreme south of New South Wales, where it was dry and the ski season extremely poor. June 1950 was Sydney's wettest month on record with 643 millimetres (25.3 in), whilst at Dorrigo on the edge of the coastal escarpment, over 1,400 millimetres (55 in) fell in the last three weeks of the month and 624 millimetres (24.6 in) on the 24th alone. Even at normally dry Longreach, 160 millimetres (6.3 in) fell for June and 140 millimetres (5.5 in) for July. Most extraordinary, however, was on the Central Coast of Queensland, where Bowen received over 400 millimetres (16 in), or twenty times its normal July rainfall.

Owing to the moist easterly flow, temperatures for the winter were remarkably mild. At Inverell, the mean minimum for July was 6 °C (43 °F), which is as much as 6 °C above normal and an incredible 10 °C (18 °F) higher than had been recorded just four years previously.

The consequences of this heavy rain falling on saturated catchments with absolutely no drying westerly winds was disastrous. Most rivers on the coast of New South Wales, and many further inland, reached record levels. Food shortages were particularly prevalent in Sydney and surrounding cities, and railways and roads were repeatedly cut as each successive storm flooded all major rivers. Vegetable crops on the Hawkesbury River were hardest hit, with most being completely destroyed and prices skyrocketing.

Except for a central portion of New South Wales, August was fairly dry. However, the continued absence of frost or westerly winds meant that at the end of winter catchments were still extremely wet. With the Southern Oscillation Index firmly established as strongly positive after a couple of years near zero, it was clear that further heavy rain was always imminent.

=== Last four months ===
September continued mild with rainfall ranging from nil in western NSW to again very heavy around Dubbo and Nyngan, but October and November, with cold air continually interacting with moist easterly winds, saw a return to the extreme wet conditions of June and July. In these two months Dubbo received a total of 420 millimetres (17 in) of rain and the flooding of March returned to the reprieved southeastern areas of New South Wales. By the end of October a large number of stations had already exceeded annual records set in the 1890s.

Wheat crops in all of Queensland and all but the Riverina in NSW, which had needed some fine weather to finish, were almost completely destroyed by the excessive rainfall. Many farmers had no crop at all because of rust and many other crops were fed to cattle as their quality as grain was extremely poor.

The continued rain and mild conditions (warm in the south, cool in the tropics) led to an outbreak of Murray Valley encephalitis which killed 19 people during the subsequent summer. It had the remarkable positive, however, of allowing the first curbs to the rabbit plague in Australia via myxomatosis, which had not spread in the dry era since 1922 because of the absence of standing water for mosquitoes to breed.

December was very wet in the north, with many rainfall records in the Georgina River basin, but was hot and dry in New South Wales except around Tibooburra in the far northwest. Between Sydney and Dubbo it was the first drier-than-normal month since 1949.

== Evaluation ==
The extremely widespread flooding that resulted from record rains and unusually low evaporation caused at least 26 deaths on the North Coast during the winter.

Although record rainfall occurred over about two-thirds of New South Wales and half of Queensland, the most remarkable rainfalls occurred over the central inland of New South Wales. At many stations in the basins of the Macquarie and Bogan Rivers, the 1950 annual rainfall are as much as 250 millimetres (10 in) higher than that of the second-wettest year in a record of around 130 years:

Station	1950 rainfall	Rainfall of second-wettest year	Records begin in
Dubbo	1,329 millimetres (52 in)	1,081 millimetres (43 in)	1873
Nyngan	1,123 millimetres (44 in)	817 millimetres (32 in)	1879

Some stations show similar differences in 1974 (central Australia) and 2000 (Northern Territory, Kimberley and Pilbara). However, it is probable that by then global warming and possibly Asian aerosols were influencing Australia's climate and thus these are not natural variability, which the record 1950 rainfalls above undoubtedly are.

Using a normal distribution one can estimate the return period of 1950-level annual rainfall for the Dubbo region as around 375 years, or about three times the length of instrumental rainfall data. For areas even a little further west, however, the skewness is too high to use this method, but there can be little doubt that the return periods are similar. Excluding records post-1968, when enhanced greenhouse gases has undoubtedly impacted Australian rainfall beyond (admittedly generally high) natural variability, there are no other totals over a substantial area that compare for improbability of being repeated.

The extreme absence of westerly winds meant that unlike 1956, 1973 and 1974, the year 1950 was not uniformly wet over Australia: indeed, in much of Tasmania and Western Australia the anticyclonic control associated with the moist airflow over New South Wales and Queensland produced unusually dry conditions. (A remarkable statistic associated with this is that, although the sixth wettest year averaged over Australia since 1900, 1950 had a higher proportion of Australia in the lowest 10 percent than 81 out of 117 other years.

== See also ==
- Climate of Australia
- La Niña
- Lake Eyre
- Southern Oscillation
