= 2025 Queensland floods =

Significant weather event in northeast Australia

- Date: 28 January 2025 – 20 April 2025
- Location: Queensland, Australia
- Cause: Tropical low-pressure systems
- Deaths: 33 total 2 direct, 31 indirect

The 2025 Queensland floods refer to significant flooding that impacted the northeast Australian state of Queensland in late January, early February, into March and April 2025. The disaster resulted in at least two fatalities from flooding, 31 fatalities from a disease outbreak and prompted mass evacuation orders in Queensland's coastal regions. As of 21 March 2025, Western Queensland was experiencing widespread torrential rainfall and flooding throughout the Southwest. As of 12 April 2025, the flooding was continuing and had an estimated cost exceeding $1.2 billion (AUD) to the Queensland economy.

== Meteorology ==
The severe weather event was characterized by two tropical lows around north Queensland that produced rainfall totals the Australian Bureau of Meteorology compared to cyclonic conditions, despite not officially forming into cyclones. A third system in the Coral Sea was identified as having a moderate chance of developing into a tropical cyclone. The weather system produced significant rainfall, with 24-hour totals reaching up to 300 millimetres (12 in) in affected areas by 1 February. The Australian Bureau of Meteorology forecast the potential for continued heavy rainfall and damaging winds into early February, with its intensity dependent on the trough's strength and position. Meteorologists forecast additional rainfall between 160 and 250 mm (6.3 and 9.8 in) in the Ingham-Townsville corridor, with potential totals reaching 450 mm (18 in) in some areas. Areas outside this corridor were expected to receive between 100 and 160 mm (3.9 and 6.3 in) over six hours, with isolated rainfall potentially reaching 300 mm (12 in) in 24 hours. Major flood warnings were issued for the Bohle, Black, Herbert, Haughton, and Ross rivers, while flood watches were implemented for the Proserpine, Burdekin, and additional sections of the Black River.

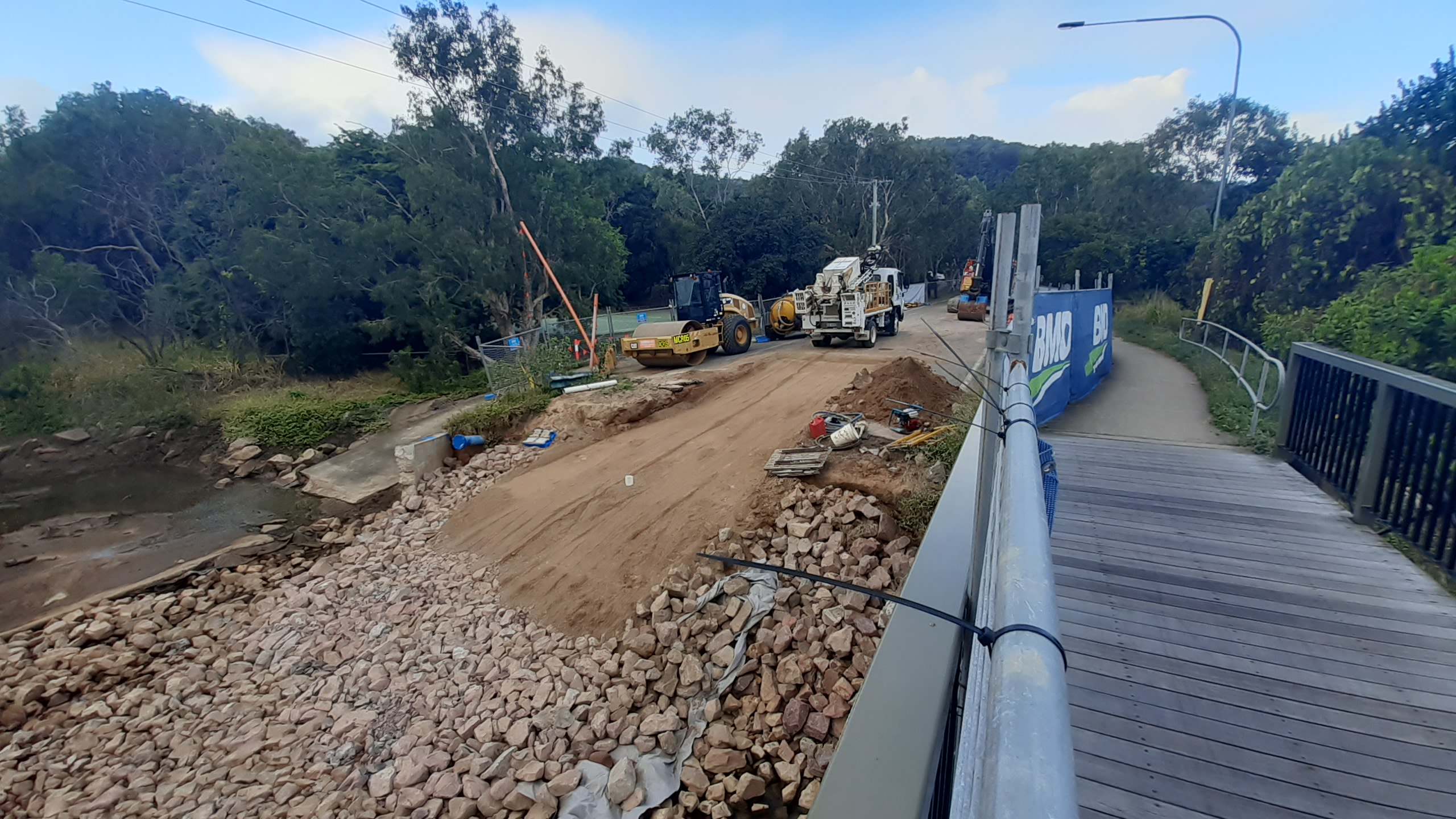
Sooning Street bridge on Magnetic Island, which links Picnic Bay with the rest of the island, being repaired in June 2025

By 4 p.m. local time on 2 February, some areas received more than 1,000 millimetres (1 metre (3 ft 3 in)) of precipitation, with Paluma recording over 175 mm (6.9 in) of rainfall within a three-hour period. Severe thunderstorms produced additional intense rainfall in the Herbert and Lower Burdekin regions. The Bureau of Meteorology reported that Paradise Lagoon recorded 164 mm (6.5 in) of rainfall in three hours, and Rollstone recorded 101 mm (4.0 in). Isolated areas near Ingham recorded over 600 mm (24 in) in 24 hours.

The Bureau of Meteorology also closely monitored tidal conditions, forecasting high tides between 3.5 and 4 metres (11 and 13 ft) on 2 February, approximately one metre (3 ft 3 in) above normal levels.

== Floods ==
Major flooding particularly impacted the Shire of Hinchinbrook, a coastal locality of approximately 11,000 residents located 1500 kilometres north of Brisbane. The flooding also affected several suburbs in the nearby city of Townsville, significantly impacting Giru. Townsville University Hospital announced the cancellation of most elective surgeries for 3 January, with only urgent procedures continuing. The Townsville Airport announced closure from 12:30 PM on 2 February due to the severe weather conditions, with airlines canceling and rescheduling services. By 3:30 p.m. local time, the Ross River Dam reached a capacity of 163.8%, causing Townsville's disaster management group to close it to the public and halt traffic to the area. The Bruce Highway Ollera Creek Bridge north of Townsville collapsed due to the flooding, delaying or cutting supplies and access by road to different communities north of the bridge. The federal government announced that the Australian Defence Force would work with Queensland's Department of Transport and Main Roads on a temporary fix for the bridge for emergency access. The Prime Minister and Premier both pledged to build the bridge back better than it had been to ensure it wouldn't be knocked out by a future event.

In Cardwell, there was extensive flooding of residential areas, particularly along Roma Street. The Cassowary Coast Regional Council issued emergency alerts for the town, warning of the possible spread of inundation in low-lying areas.

In Ingham, floodwaters inundated several local businesses and caused widespread road closures. One person in Ingham was rescued from his submerged vehicle by community members. Approximately 6,700 properties lost power after the Ingham Substation was deactivated for safety purposes. The Herbert River rose significantly to 14.89 metres (48.9 ft), with predicted peak levels expected to rise to 15.2 metres (50 ft), matching historic flooding caused by Cyclone Dinah in March 1967. A woman drowned in floodwaters at Ingham when a State Emergency Service (SES) boat capsized after striking a tree on Rutledge Street, prompting investigation. The vessel was carrying six people at the time of the incident, with five being safely rescued. An 82-year-old woman was found dead in a cane paddock near Ingham on 4 February.

The locality of Palm Island suffered a complete power outage after its electrical network was damaged in a landslide.

On 19 March 2025, North Queensland was once again hit with significant flooding across Townsville and surrounds, with Toolakea being the most impacted, having recorded 293mm of rain.

=== Power outages ===
The flooding caused significant disruption to essential services across north Queensland. More than 8,000 homes lost power, with approximately 6,000 affected properties in Hinchinbrook, 2,000 in Townsville, and 600 in Mackay.

=== Goods shortages ===
Due to the floods, major transport routes such as Bruce Highway were cut off in several places in early February, leading to numerous reports of produce supply shortages. Supermarkets in Cairns, Innisfail and Ingham were reported to have emptied produce sections, except for excessive amounts of bananas, a local product; conversely, other regions of Australia anticipated banana shortages, as almost all of Australia's banana production takes place in the affected region.

=== Melioidosis ===
At least 31 people in Queensland were killed by an outbreak of melioidosis, a soil-borne disease. Cairns and Townsville saw the majority of cases. One theory for the spike in melioidosis cases documented by a Cairns Hospital specialist doctor was that the Bruce Highway upgrades that commenced in 2010 stirred up clay-like soil that may harbour the disease.

== Response ==
Regional emergency management authorities issued evacuation orders for low-lying areas in coastal Queensland due to continuous torrential rainfall threatening life and property, and urged evacuees to bring evacuation kits. Mandatory evacuations were ordered for six suburbs of Townsville designated as being in the "black zone", including Cluden, Oonoonba, Hermit Park, Railway Estate, Idalia, and Rosslea. Despite evacuation orders, some residents, particularly elderly community members, chose to remain in their homes.

The State Emergency Service responded to dozens of calls for assistance across Ingham, Cardwell, Halifax, and other isolated communities. Swift water rescue teams conducted multiple operations in flood-affected areas, including the evacuation and rescue of families, several individuals stranded on rooftops in Cardwell, and one man found hanging onto a fence in Ingham. The Queensland government declared disaster situations for Townsville, Hinchinbrook, and Innisfail.

Ergon Energy implemented power shutdowns in flood-prone areas to prevent catastrophic equipment failure. An Ergon Energy vehicle was stolen while responding to reports of downed power lines in Townsville, though the vehicle was later recovered.

The Insurance Council of Australia (ICA) declared the floods a "significant event," with the potential to escalate to "insurance catastrophe" status based on claim numbers and complexity.

The Department of the Environment, Tourism, Science and Innovation issued warnings about increased crocodile activity during the flooding, including in areas where they were typically not present.

The Australian Government activated Personal Hardship Assistance for parts of Townsville and select Gordonvale addresses. The assistance package included emergency payments of $180 per person and up to $900 for families of five or more, as well as possible grants for structural repairs and impacted household goods. Prime Minister of Australia Anthony Albanese pledged the "full support" of both Queensland and federal governments, committing to provide all necessary resources to address the crisis. The Prime Minister confirmed direct communication with Premier of Queensland David Crisafulli to coordinate response efforts.

== See also ==
- 2025 New South Wales floods
