= Gold Coast Local Heritage Register =

The Gold Coast Local Heritage Register is a heritage register containing a list of culturally-significant places within the City of Gold Coast, Queensland, Australia. Under Section 113 of the Queensland Heritage Act 1992, all local government authorities in Queensland must maintain a local heritage register.

== Criteria ==
Listings on the Gold Coast Local Heritage Register must satisfy one or more of the following criteria:

- illustrates the evolution or pattern in local history
- has rare, uncommon or endangered aspects of cultural heritage
- aids the knowledge and understanding of local history
- illustrates the important characteristics of a particular class cultural places
- has aesthetic significance
- was very creative or technologically advanced for its period
- has special links to a particular community or cultural group
- has special links to a significant local historical person or organisation

== See also ==
- Category:Gold Coast Local Heritage Register for list of sites on the Gold Coast Local Heritage Register with Wikipedia articles
