= Black nor'easter =

Type of storm occurring in southeastern Australia

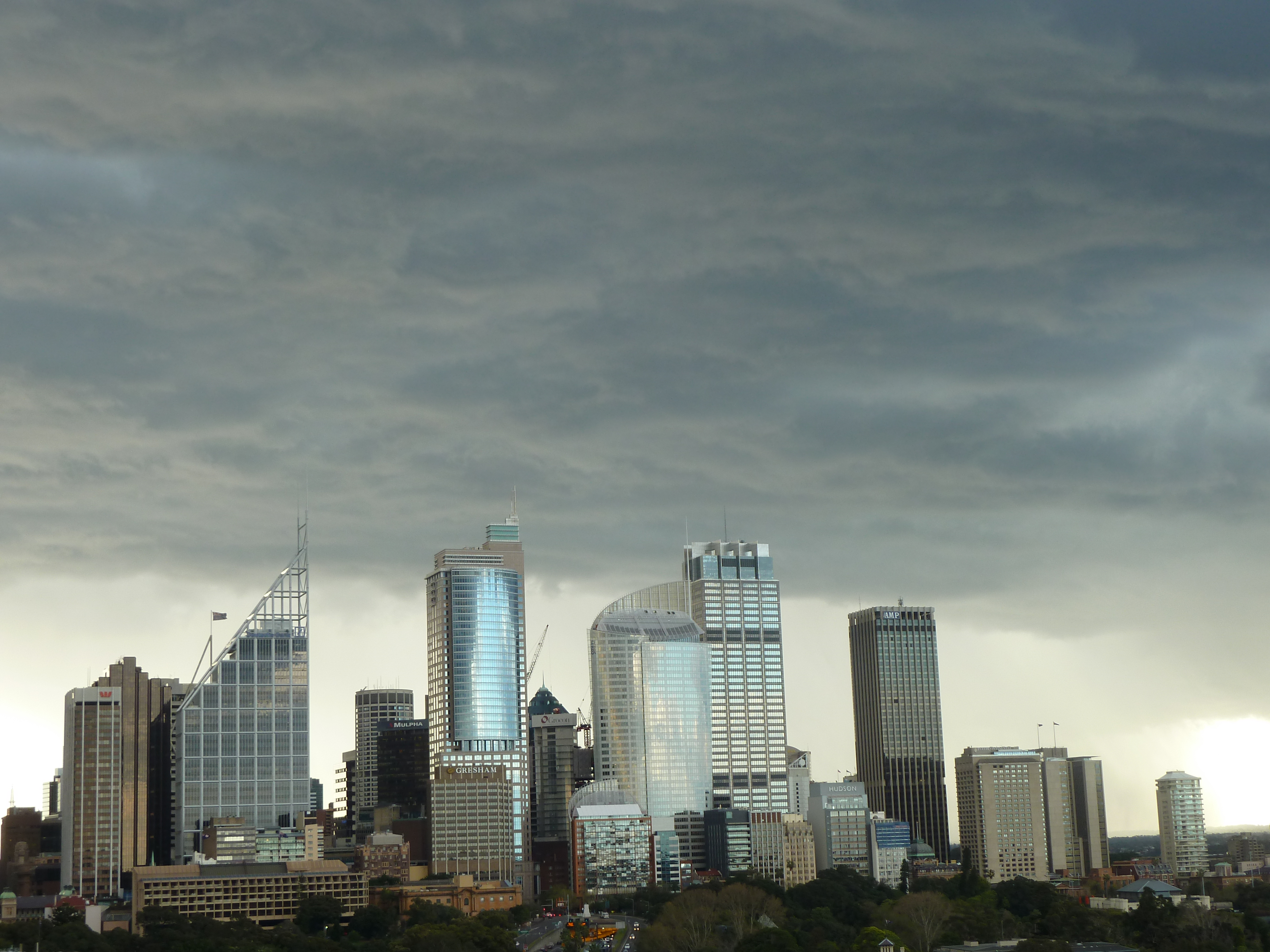
The dark storm clouds associated with the Black nor'easter over Sydney CBD

A black nor'easter is a persistent and potentially violent north-easterly storm that occurs on the east coast of Australia, particularly from southeastern Queensland to southern New South Wales, usually between late spring and early autumn, about two days a year (or more, depending on the intensity).

Developing offshore as a deep coastal trough, the storm is heralded by the rapid build-up of dense black cloud that brings heavy rainfall and strong northeasterly winds along the east coast of Australia. A black nor'easter can be a combination of surface troughs, onshore flow, and a low. The storm system may cool down warm days due to the persistent blanket of thick moisture-rich clouds.

Although not convection-driven, the north-east wind field leading warm moist tropical air to the subtropics and mid-latitudes can combine with a higher level cut off low from the Southern Ocean. Black nor'easters were first recorded during the 19th century and were so-named because the affiliated darkness (of the moisture-loaded clouds) can transform the day to as dark as twilight.

== Background ==
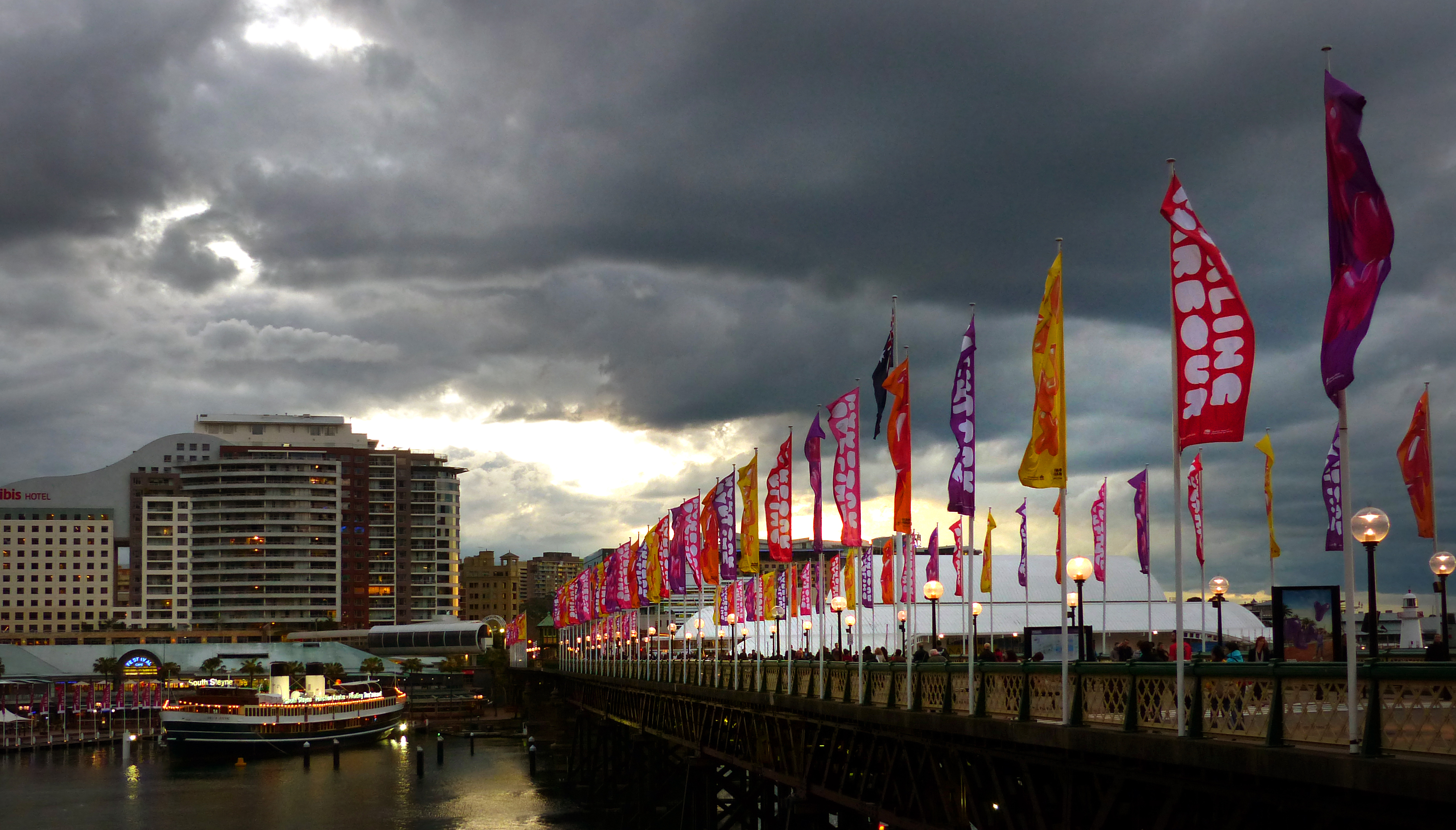
Dark clouds forming before the storm in Darling Harbour

The cause of a black nor'easter is the gathering of moist cooler air from the south and the tropical humid flow from the north, where north easterly winds aggregate with the moisture, thereby creating dark, rain-filled clouds. The first description of a black nor'easter was presented by the Sydney Morning Herald on 30 October 1911, where it described a black nor'easter in southern New South Wales:

Conditions were undergoing a change, which portended unsettled, thundery weather with rain in scattered parts of the State. Yesterday afternoon a black nor'-easter raged, the wind attaining a mean average velocity of 26 miles.

Northeasterly sea breezes are a common occurrence on the NSW coast during summer, generated by temperature imbalances between the sea and the land. A broader synoptic pattern however can greatly intensify these onshore winds, which results in a "Black Nor'easter", so-named because of its dark grey to virtually black clouds and the moist gale-force winds (around 60 kilometres per hour) brought on by intense high-pressure systems, thus eventually bringing thunderstorms, dramatic rainfall and at times hail.

Unlike an East coast low (ECL), which tends to occur in the cool months, a black nor'easter occurs in the warm months and originates from the northeast, although a black nor'easter can turn into an east coast low as it heads south, such as in the case of the 2022 Eastern Australia flood event. Also unlike ECL's, black nor'easters can heavily affect inland areas of New South Wales and Queensland.

== Formation ==
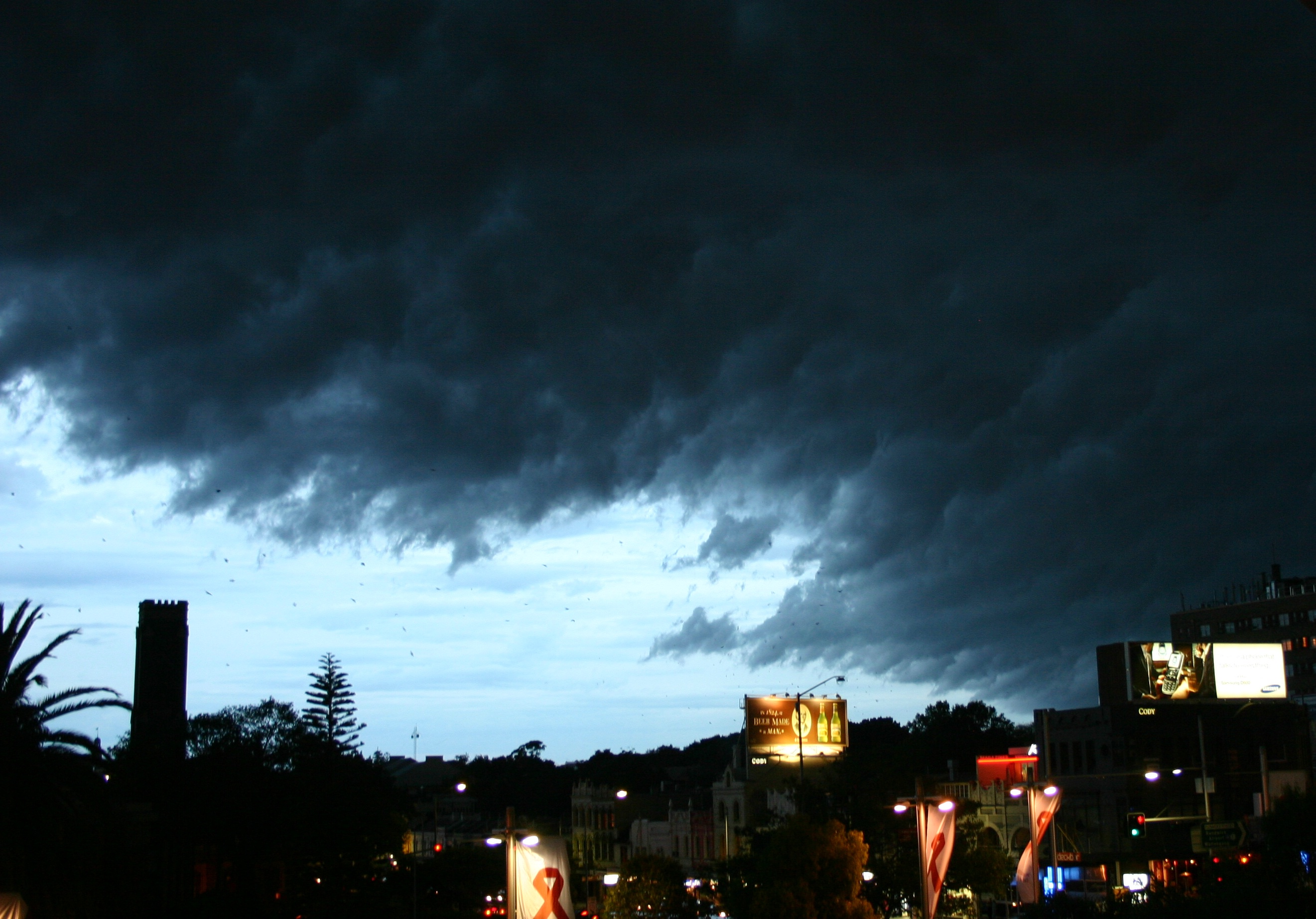
The virtually black clouds associated with the storm over Darlinghurst

Black nor'easters are generally cut-off low systems that simultaneously interact with moisture-laden coastal troughs, which pull in humid tropical airflow (i.e. atmospheric river) from the north, whereby the cold upper air cools down the warmer, saturated air, forcing a lot of moisture to fall as rain. This interaction is oftentimes a formula for heavy rainfall and flooding on the east coast. Black nor'easters can be intensified by warm sea temperatures on the East Australian Current (EAC).

Forecaster Craig Brokensha, describes a black nor'easter; "an unstable low pressure trough drifting from inland Australia, moisture feeding into another trough sitting adjacent the East Coast, with the two predicted to combine." They can also be formed by a cool pool of air that arrive from the Great Australian Bight, whereby spurring a low-pressure system over the southeast simultaneously as a moisture-rich coastal trough (fueled by warm sea temperature) – This can cause higher evaporation, thereby raising the amount of liquid in the atmosphere. When this moisture is brought south by moist northeasterly winds and chilled by the cooler air in the upper-level low higher up, it condenses and falls as rain.

Referred as an anticyclone intensification and usually intensified by a blocking high, the nor'easter causes a sharp leap in wave heights from the east-northeast for the east coast, conjuring a strong north-east air current and east-north east storm waves over the western Tasman Sea. The winds ofttimes produce large waves and, when combined with an east coast low, they bring forth the most intense storm wave environment.

== Incidents ==
Due to the strong winds caused by the Black Nor'easterly storms, a number of people in New South Wales (especially in Sydney) have been killed by falling trees. Furthermore, such storms also bring torrential floods, strike down power lines (where thousands of homes and businesses would be left without electricity) and collapse roofs.

== Notable storms ==
- In February 2010, Sydney received some of the highest and heaviest rainfalls in 25 years which were accompanied by violent thunderstorms and gusty winds that cut out power and damaged homes. The heavy rain was caused by remnants of ex-tropical Cyclone Olga and by a massive amount of moisture blowing in on north-east winds which slammed into a low pressure trough.
- On 18 November 2013, a tornado hit Hornsby, a suburb in the Upper North Shore. The tornado's path was 2 km (1.2 mi) long and 50 m (160 ft) wide. The tornado blew off roofs and toppled large trees. The winds in the tornado reached 140 kilometres per hour (87 mph). A total of 12 people were injured in the tornado.
- The black nor'easter swell of June 2016 remoulded areas of the east Australian coastline, with backyards tumbling down into the sea at Collaroy and the houses adjoining them damaged. Bridges, piers, and walkways were felled as well. Almost every north facing beach endured some level of erosion, from unsophisticated scouring of the foredune to waves devouring into the brown dirt. In Cronulla, several large boulders were thrown from beneath the tide zone up onto a rock platform.
- Between 7 and 9 February 2020, the Sydney metropolitan area received its heaviest rain in 30 years, in addition to vast flooding and strong winds that caused commuter chaos and left over 100,000 homes without power. Sydney CBD recorded around 391.6 mm (15.42 in) of rain within those three days. The storm also affected the South Coast, Blue Mountains, Southern Highlands, Hunter Valley and the Central Coast.

Black nor'easter clouds over southeast Australia (March 2021)

- On 20 March 2021, a tornado damaged homes and toppled trees in Chester Hill, a western suburb of Sydney, leaving thousands without electricity. Moreover, the storm brought record rainfall in the north coast, with towns near Port Macquarie, such as Kendall seeing record rainfall of more than 400 millimetres (16 inches) between 19 and 20 March. This heavy rainfall event was caused by a blocking high in the Tasman Sea that directed a strong, moist, low pressure trough towards the NSW coast.
- In late February and early March 2022, a black nor'easter persisted for nearly two weeks where it ravaged the southeast coast of Australia, flooding areas of major cities such as Brisbane, Lismore and as well as western Sydney, among other cities. Although the nor'easter turned into an east coast low as it moved south.
- The July 2022 floods were caused by a black nor'easter due to tropical moisture that arrived from northern Australia which interacted with a low pressure trough on the New South Wales coast and later became an east coast low.
- Between 4 and 6 April 2024, a black nor'easter dumped heavy rain in southern Queensland and New South Wales, killing one man in Logan, Queensland and another in Western Sydney. At 167mm, Penrith recorded its heaviest rainfall on record. Over 100mm fell in areas in southern Queensland and the NSW Northern Rivers on the 4th, causing floods.

== See also ==
- Southerly buster
- Australian east coast low
- Severe weather events in Sydney
