= Severe weather events in Sydney =

Notable weather extremities in an Australian city

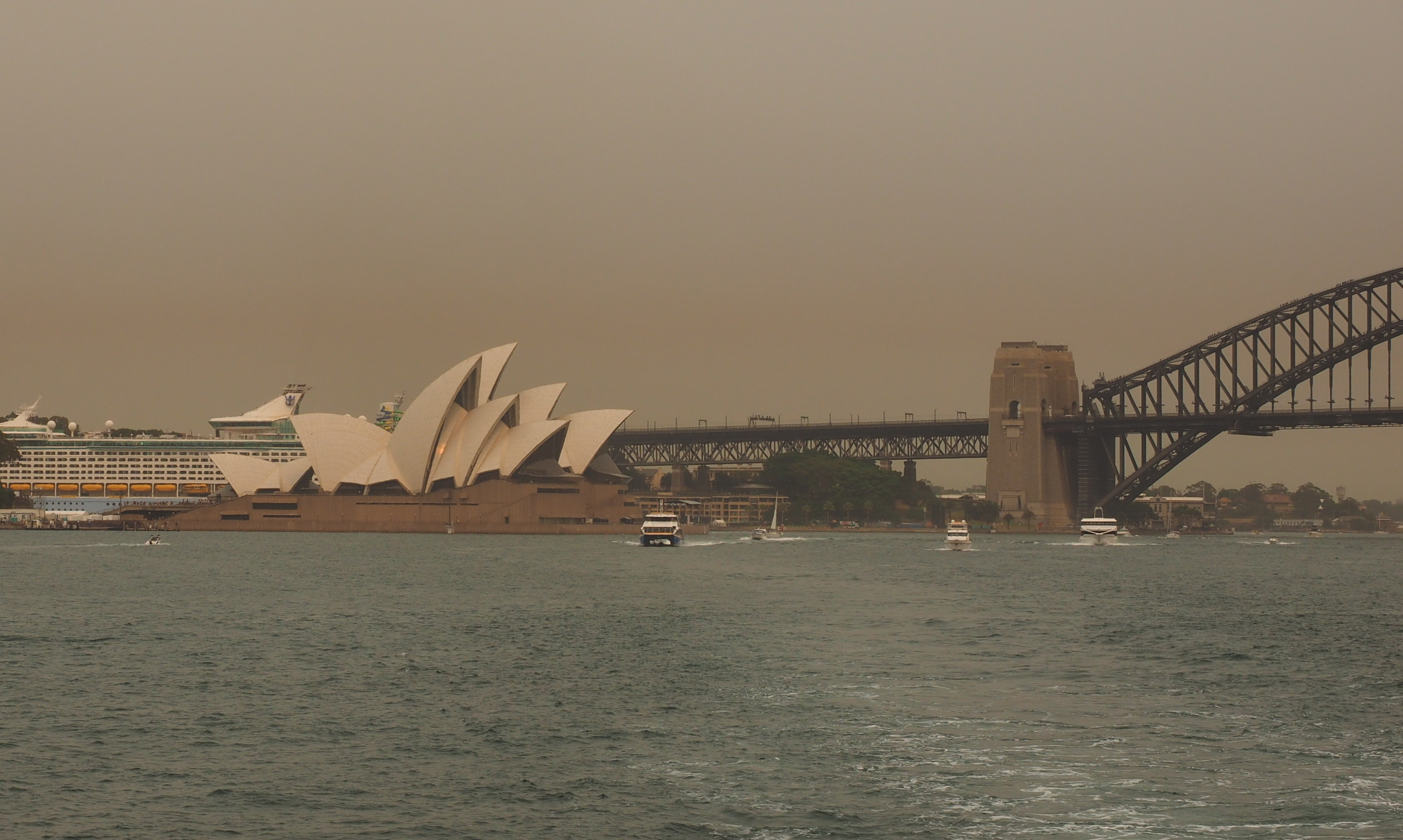
Bushfire smoke following the Black Summer bushfires in December 2019

Severe weather events or extreme weather events in Sydney, include hailstorms, thunderstorms, gale, bushfires, heatwaves, drought, and flash flooding (caused by East coast lows or black nor'easters). Sydney is rarely affected by cyclones, although remnants of cyclones do affect the city.

Global warming has increased the chances of extreme rain and flash floods in Sydney recently, such as the notable 2021 and 2022 flood events. Nevertheless, destructive heavy rainfall events have been recorded in the Sydney area since records began in the 18th century.

Annually, coastal Sydney sees five heat-related deaths per 100,000 people while the western suburbs see 14 per 100,000. Heat-related deaths in the city were common in the late 19th and early 20th century period (due to lack of air conditioners) where several individual cases were reported.

== Temperatures ==
=== 1800s–1990s ===
- 5 January 1863 is Sydney's first recorded 40 °C (104 °F) day, when the mercury hit 41.6 °C (106.9 °F) at Sydney's Observatory Hill.
- On 19 July 1868, Observatory Hill recorded a maximum temperature of just 7.7 °C (45.9 °F), the lowest daily maximum temperature on record for Sydney.
- During January 1896, a state wide heatwave blasted through NSW and caused the mercury in Sydney to hit 40.7 °C (105.3 °F) on the 6th and 42.5 °C (108.5 °F) on the 13th, this ended Sydney's longest streak of days under 40.0 °C (104.0 °F) which lasted from 14 January 1870 – 5 January 1896. The heatwave also caused the death of 437 people across eastern Australia.
- On 10 January 1929, extreme heat kills thousands of fowls on poultry farms in the city as temperatures rose to 41.2 °C (106 °F).
- On 11 June 1931, Sydney registered its warmest June day on record at 26.9 °C (80.4 °F), this was more than 10 degrees above the average June temperature at the time.
- On 6 March 1938, Richmond in Sydney's north western area recorded the highest autumn temperature in the city's metropolitan area, shattering the previous record by almost 3C when it hit 41.9 °C (107.4 °F).
- On 1 April 1945, Sydney experienced its coldest April day in 86 years, with a minimum temperature of 10.8 °C (51.5 °F) and a maximum of 18.3 °C (64.9 °F).
- In 1972, Sydney recorded its coldest August day on record, with a maximum temperature of 9.1 °C (48.4 °F).
- On 1 February 1977, Sydney was hit by a massive heatwave that sent record breaking temperatures never seen in the month of February. Temperatures skyrocketed to 45.8 °C (114.4 °F) at Liverpool, more than 2 degrees hotter than anywhere else in Sydney. Other places that broke heat records at the time were Sydney CBD's second hottest day at 41.4 °C (106.5 °F), Bankstown 43.3 °C (109.9 °F), and Richmond 43.7 °C (110.7 °F) which stood as the hottest February days at both Bankstown and Richmond for 40 years.
- On 3 July 1984, Sydney CBD recorded a maximum temperature of just 9.6 °C (49.3 °F).
- On 27 July 1986, the temperature at Observatory Hill fell to 3.1 °C (37.6 °F), making it Sydney's coldest July morning in the instrumental record.
- The highest recorded minimum temperature in Sydney was registered at Orchard Hills, New South Wales, a suburb right beneath Penrith, at 29.8 °C (85.6 °F) on 9 January 1983.
- On 21 October 1988, Camden, Richmond and Parramatta recorded the first and only instance of a 40.0 °C (104.0 °F) during the month of October in Greater Sydney. Camden hitting 40.5 °C (104.9 °F), Richmond hitting 40.4 °C (104.7 °F) and Parramatta hitting 40.1 °C (104.2 °F).

=== 1990s–2000s ===
- On 26 August 1995, Sydney CBD recorded its hottest winter day on record at 31.3 °C (88.3 °F).
- On 15 January 2001, Penrith hit 46.0 °C (114.8 °F) and Prospect Reservoir hit 44.7 °C (112.5 °F) as a result of a statewide heatwave. This was hottest day at both stations until 2013 and Greater Sydney's hottest day in 62 years. Sydney CBD's temperature was only 31.9 °C (89.4 °F) that day.
- From 25–26 November 2002, Sydney CBD recorded two days in a row with a maximum temperature of 37.9 °C (100.2 °F), its first instance in Spring. Greater Sydney had the top three hottest places on earth that day, Penrith 42.6 °C (108.7 °F), Parramatta 42.1 °C (107.8 °F) and Richmond 42.0 °C (107.6 °F).
- From 18 January – 30 January 2003, Greater Sydney recorded four days above 42 °C (108 °F). Maximum temperatures during these 12 days were 45 °C (113 °F) on the 18th at Liverpool, 42.5 °C (108.5 °F) on the 21st at Penrith, 42.3 °C (108.1 °F) on the 26th at Penrith, and 45.3 °C (113.5 °F) on the 30th at Badgerys Creek. This weather pattern was never seen before at the time.
- On 21 February 2004, Penrith recorded Greater Sydney's latest instance of a 45 °C (113 °F) day, hitting that exact temperature.
- On 13 October 2004, Sydney CBD and Sydney Airport recorded their hottest day in the month in october, with 39.1 °C (102.4 °F) at the airport and 38.2 °C (100.8 °F) at the CBD, both defeating a record set in 1942 by almost a degree.
- The morning of 7 August 2005 was the coldest August morning ever seen in Greater Sydney, when the temperature in Richmond plummeted to −4.0 °C (24.8 °F), the previous August low record was in 1941, 0.4C warmer.
- 1 January 2006 was Sydney's hottest New Year's Day ever recorded. Sydney Airport and Parramatta had their hottest days on record at the time, 45.2 °C (113.4 °F) at the Airport and 44.8 °C (112.6 °F) at Parramatta, beating their records dating back to November 1982 and January 2003.
- On 16 November 2006, Observatory Hill recorded a minimum temperature of 11.4 °C (52.5 °F), making it Sydney's coldest November night in more than a century.
- On 17 July 2007, Sydney CBD recorded its coldest morning since 1986 and its coldest morning so far in the 21st century, when the temperature dipped to 3.7 °C (38.7 °F). Temperatures west of the CBD dipped to −3.5 °C (25.7 °F) at Badgerys Creek.
- In the summer of 2007–2008, Sydney CBD didn't experience a singular day over 31 °C (88 °F), only the third instance of it happening.
- On 23 October 2008, Observatory Hill recorded a maximum temperature of just 14.9 °C (58.8 °F), making it Sydney's coldest October day in 30 years.
- November 2009 was the hottest November in the CBD in 115 years and the hottest November on record for most of Greater Sydney. The average maximum temperature at the CBD and Penrith were 26.1 °C (79.0 °F) and 32.2 °C (90.0 °F). The highest temperatures recorded during the month were 42.5 °C (108.5 °F) at Sydney Airport and 42.2 °C (108.0 °F) at Penrith. Sydney CBD registered its then second hottest spring day at 40.4 °C (104.7 °F).

=== 2010s ===
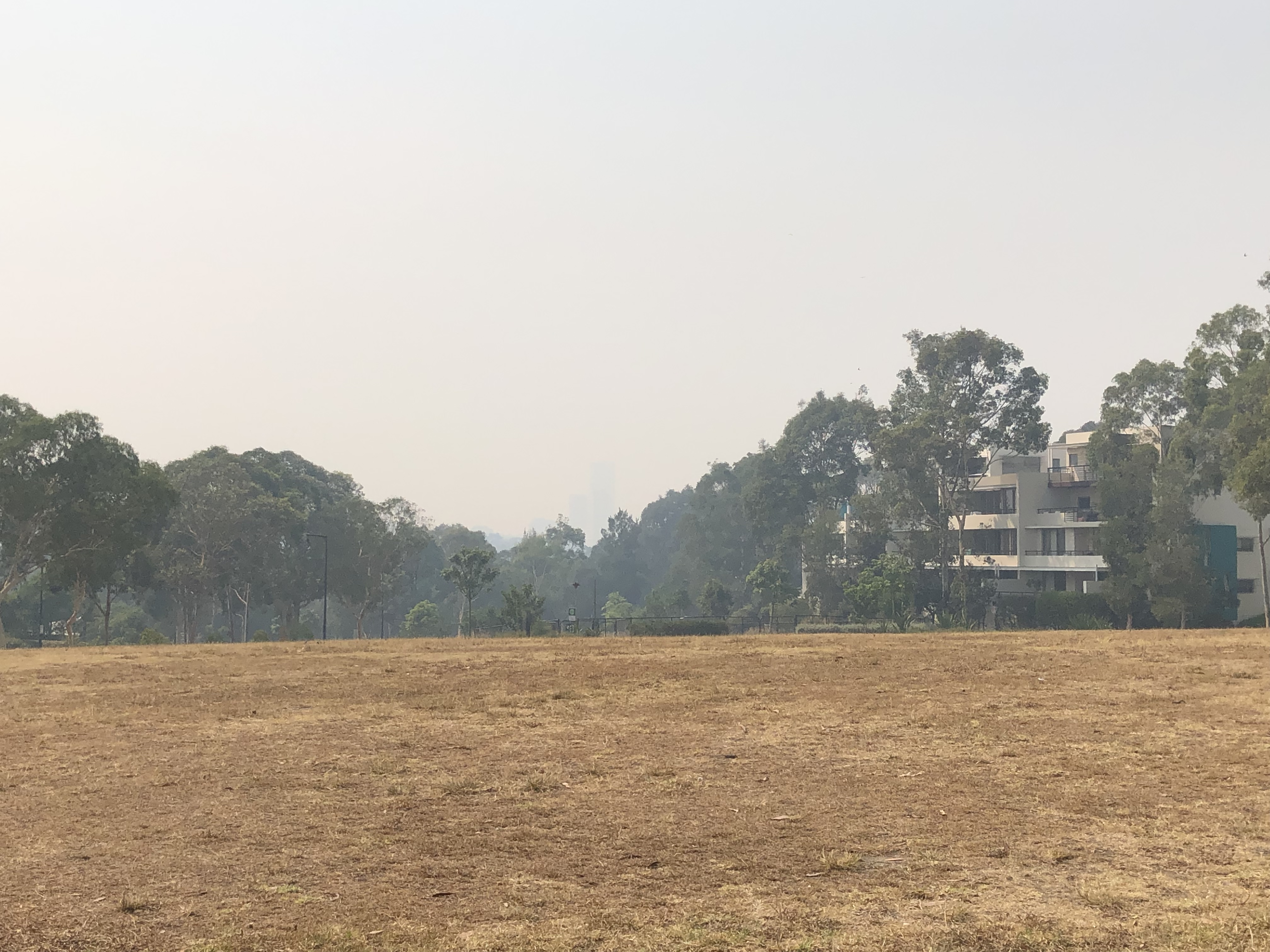
Persistently hot, dry conditions enforce water restrictions in the city.

- From 30 January to 6 February 2011, Western Sydney endured eight days in a row above 35 °C (95 °F) along with 5 nights in a row above 24 °C (75 °F). 6 days reached 39 °C (102 °F) with a peak temperature of 42.2 °C (108.0 °F) on 5 February. Along with that was Sydney CBD's warmest night within its 160 years of record keeping, at 27.6 °C (81.7 °F) on 6 February.
- On 23 August 2012, a foehn effect caused Sydney to record its 3rd warmest August day on record where it reached 29.0 °C (84 °F) at the CBD and 30.0 °C (86 °F) at Sydney Airport.
- The highest recorded maximum temperature at Observatory Hill was 45.8 °C (114.4 °F) on 18 January 2013 during a prolonged heat wave across Australia from early December 2012 to late January 2013.
- July 2013 was the warmest on record, with an average maximum temperature of 19.5 °C (67.1 °F), which is 3.2 °C (5.8 °F) above the historical average. This was due to persistent, warm northerly winds and clear conditions.
- In September 2013, temperatures were 4 °C (7 °F) above average and the city had over seven days where temperatures reached 28 °C (82 °F), making it more similar to November's weather pattern.
- On 23 November 2014, Sydney recorded its hottest spring day, with 45.3 °C (113.5 °F)in Richmond and 44.9 °C (112.8 °F) in Penrith, breaking the previous 1982 record by 1.7C (3.6F). Meanwhile, Sydney CBD remained much cooler at 30.1 °C (86.2 °F) a 15.2C (27.4F) difference from Richmond.
- October 2015 had the warmest nights on record, which were 3.3 °C (5.9 °F) above average.
- In the summer of 2016–17, Sydney CBD experienced a record-breaking of 26 days where temperatures were above 30 °C (86 °F) and 11 days of temperatures higher than 35 °C (95 °F), with record numbers of days above 40 °C (104 °F) recorded in western Sydney including 11 days at Richmond, in addition to the most warm nights on record.
- On 10–11 February 2017, a heatwave swept through NSW, breaking multiple records, including parts of Sydney's hottest February days. Parramatta and Bankstown hit 44.5 °C (112.1 °F) on the 10th, surpassing records from 1979 and 1977. Sydney Airport reached 42.9 °C (109.2 °F), breaking its 1980 record. On the 11th, Sydney's west was hit harder; Camden Airport recorded 45.6 °C (114.1 °F), Penrith 46.9 °C (116.4 °F), and Richmond 47.0 °C (116.6 °F), all surpassing previous records, some by significant margins.

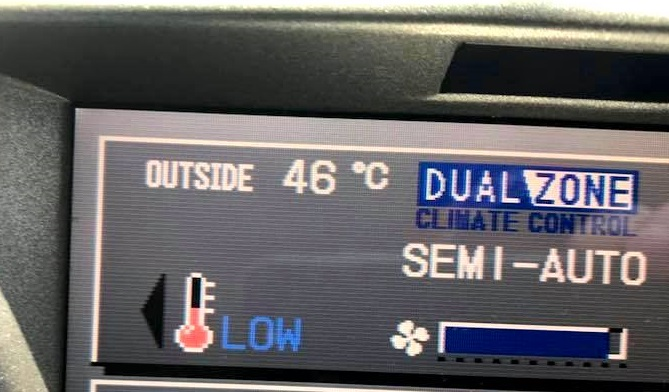
Car thermometer displaying a reading of 46 °C on 7 January 2018

- On 7 January 2018, Sydney was the hottest place on Earth as Penrith reached 47.3 °C (117.1 °F).
- In April 2018, Sydney had the longest running hot spell for that month with nine consecutive days of temperatures reaching 25 °C (77 °F). Furthermore, the airport and parts of the western suburbs also broke heat records in that month.
- January 2019 was the hottest month on record for most of Sydney. The average maximum temperature at the airport was 30.6 °C (87.1 °F), 4 °C above average with 19 calendar days in a row above 20 °C (12–31 January). The average maximum temperature at Richmond was 33.8 °C (92.8 °F) and recorded a whopping 15 days above 35 °C (95 °F) that month. Highs of 42.4 °C (108.3 °F) were recorded on 5 and 17 January at Penrith.
- On New Years Eve 2019, Penrith recorded its hottest December day when the temperature peaked at 46.3 °C (115 °F).

=== 2020s–present ===
- The highest recorded maximum temperature in Sydney was recorded at Penrith with a high of 48.9 °C (120 °F) on 4 January 2020. Moreover, a temperature logger at Berkshire Park recorded 52.0 °C (125.6 °F), the highest temperature measured in the Sydney Basin, although the reading was unofficial. Also on that day, Penrith again earned the title of the "hottest place on earth".
- On 1 February 2020, Western Sydney was once again the hottest place on the earth on that day, when Richmond hit 46.8 °C (116.2 °F), the 5th hottest temperature recorded in Greater Sydney. As of December 2024 this is the last instance of a day above 45 °C (113 °F) in sydney.
- From 28–29 November 2020, Sydney Airport recorded its hottest two days in a row. The 28th registered 43 °C (109 °F) while the 29th had registered 42.6 °C (108.7 °F). On the morning of the second day of the heatwave, many places in Sydney failed to dip below 25 °C (77 °F)-28 °C (82 °F), places like Parramatta failed to dip below 26.5 °C (79.7 °F), beating its 52 year old record by 0.9°C and Bankstown failing to dip below 28.1 °C (82.6 °F), a record for all months (previous record being 26 °C (79 °F) on 2 February 2011).
- On 29 November 2020, Sydney recorded its warmest November night on record when the minimum temperature at Observatory Hill fell only to 25.3 °C (77.5 °F), surpassing the previous record set in 1967. The event occurred during a severe late-spring heatwave that also produced consecutive days above 40 °C (104 °F) across parts of the city.

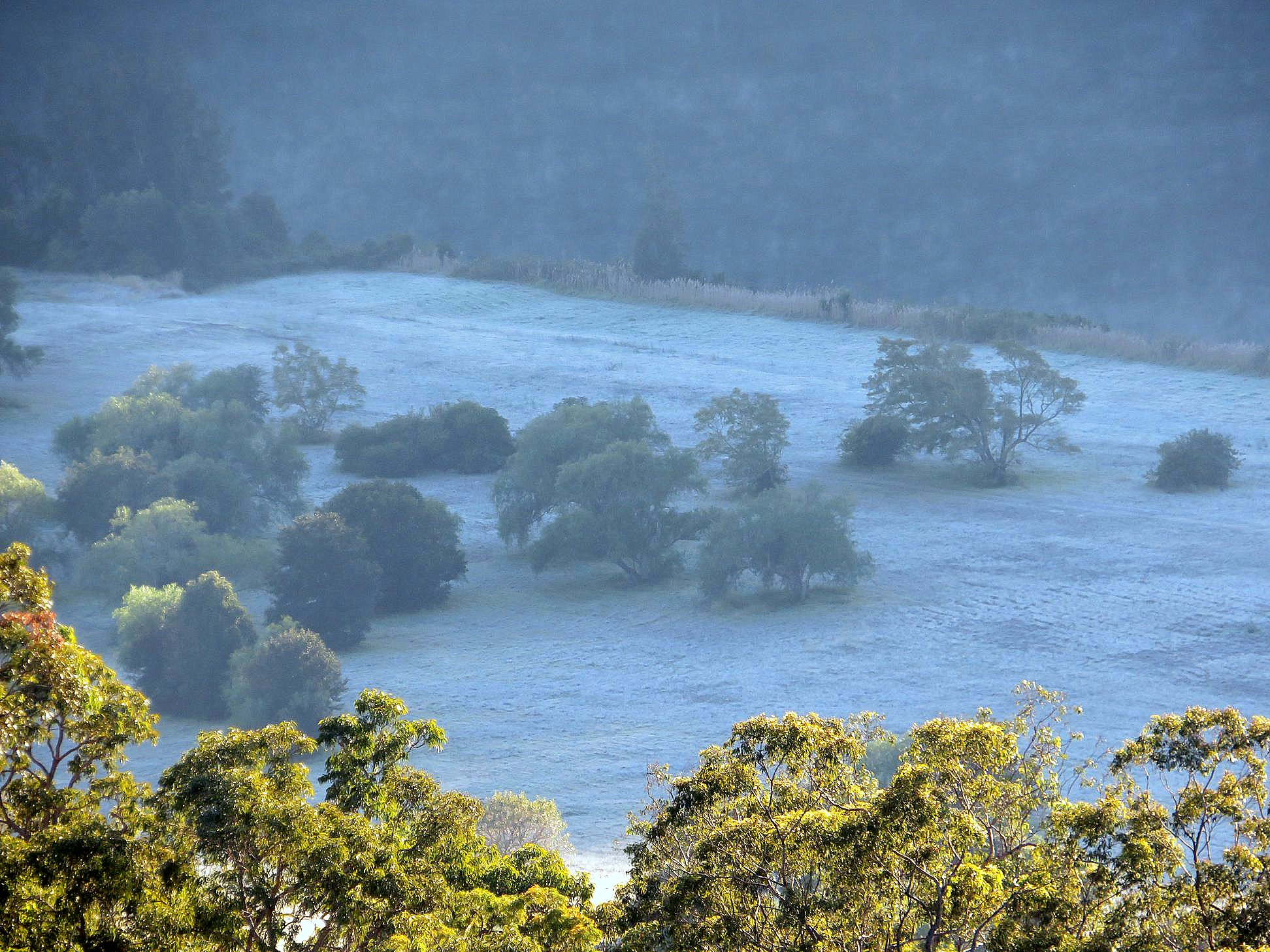
Frosty morning in the Hawkesbury valley

- During May 2021, Sydney CBD recorded its coldest stretch of May days in 54 years due to a polar blast that swept across Australia's southeast, which kept the temperatures below 9 °C (48 °F) in the early mornings for five consecutive nights, in addition to the inland suburbs dipping down to 1 °C (34 °F) in Camden and 5 °C (41 °F) in Sydney Olympic Park.
- On 10 June 2021, Sydney CBD had its coldest day since 1984 and the coldest June day since 1899, where it reached a maximum of just 10.3 °C (50.5 °F). Bankstown, a western suburb, only reached 9.7 °C (49.5 °F), its coldest day in 50 years, with nearby suburbs registering a similar temperature. These unusually cold maximums were caused by a cut-off low, which is a slow moving, sizeable Antarctic cold air mass that got "cut-off" from the westerly trough systems of cold air in the south where it reached the east coast.
- August 2021 registered 15 consecutive winter days above 20 °C (68 °F), the first time in 163 years of records, which was achieved due to a lack of cold fronts or rain over NSW during the month and a blocking high in Southern Australia that prevented cold fronts from reaching the continent.
- On 24 August 2021, the maximum temperature recorded at Observatory Hill after 9:00 am was only 10.2 °C (50.4 °F) by 5:00 pm, based on one-minute observational data.
- In September 2023, Western Sydney had six days in a row where the temperature was higher than 32 °C (90 °F), beating the previous September record of five consecutive days.
- On 19–20 September 2023, Sydney Airport beat its highest temperature that month two days in a row, at 35.9 °C (96.6 °F) on the 19th and 35.7 °C (96.3 °F) on the 20th. These two days only just tipped the previous peak of 35.6 °C (96.1 °F) on the 29th in 2000.
- On 1 October 2023, the city had the hottest start on record where temperatures were 14 °C (57 °F) above average in most suburbs.
- In December 2023, Sydney CBD (Observatory Hill) experienced the hottest first fortnight of summer on record where the average maximum temperature was 29.5 °C (85.1 °F), which beats the previous record of 28.9 °C (84.0 °F) from the first fortnight of summer in 1976.
- 9 December 2023 was Sydney Airport's hottest December day ever recorded, where the temperature soared to 43.5 °C (110.3 °F). Temperatures in the west reached a maximum of 44.0 °C (111.2 °F) at Badgerys Creek. This was also the hottest day in Greater Sydney since the Black Summer bushfires from 2019 to 2020.
- On 11 January 2024, Sydney recorded its muggiest day on record, where the dew point reached 26.9 °C (80.4 °F), just beating the previous record of 25.9 °C (78.6 °F) on 14 November 2011.
- On 30 August 2024, Sydney Airport broke its winter record of 31.1 °C (88.0 °F) (which was registered in 1954), reaching 31.6 °C (88.9 °F) in the afternoon.
- On 27 November 2024, Sydney Airport warmed to 38.1 °C (100.6 °F) at 12:15 pm, which made it the hottest place in the world at that time (a few reasons being due to the foehn effect and UHI effect).
- On 30 July 2023, the temperature at Observatory Hill reached 25.2 °C (77.4 °F), while some western suburbs reached 26 °C (78.8 °F).
- On 28 January 2025, most of Greater Sydney recorded its hottest January day since Black Summer, reaching 42.5 °C (108.5 °F) at Sydney Airport and Penrith and 43.3 °C (109.9 °F) at Badgerys Creek.
- On 14-16 March 2025 Greater Sydney endured 3 days in a row above 37.0 °C (98.6 °F), with a maximum temperature of 39.3 °C (102.7 °F) at Sydney Airport.
- The highest autumn minimum temperature was recorded on 16 March 2025, when the temperature failed to drop below 25.9 °C (78.6 °F) at Sydney's Observatory Hill for the day, marking the citys highest autumn minimum temperature since record keeping began in 1859.
- On 30 July 2025, Bankstown recorded a maximum temperature of just 11.2 °C (52.2 °F), its coldest July day in 35 years.
- On 8 November 2026, an unusually strong cold front swept across south-eastern Australia, causing Sydney to record a minimum temperature of 9.7 °C (49.5 °F), its coldest November night in 20 years.

== Bushfires and drought ==
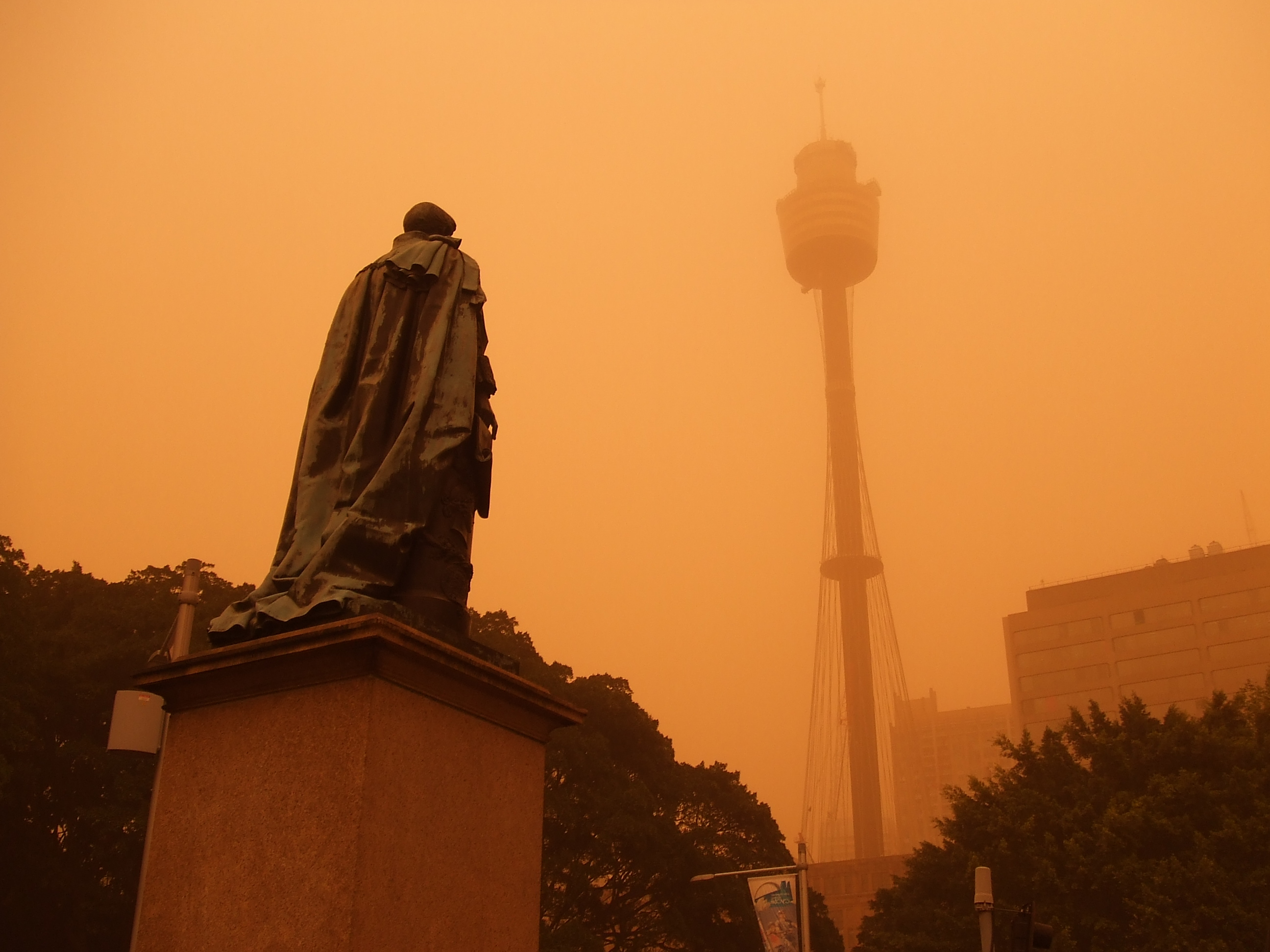
Sydney CBD during the 2009 Australian dust storm

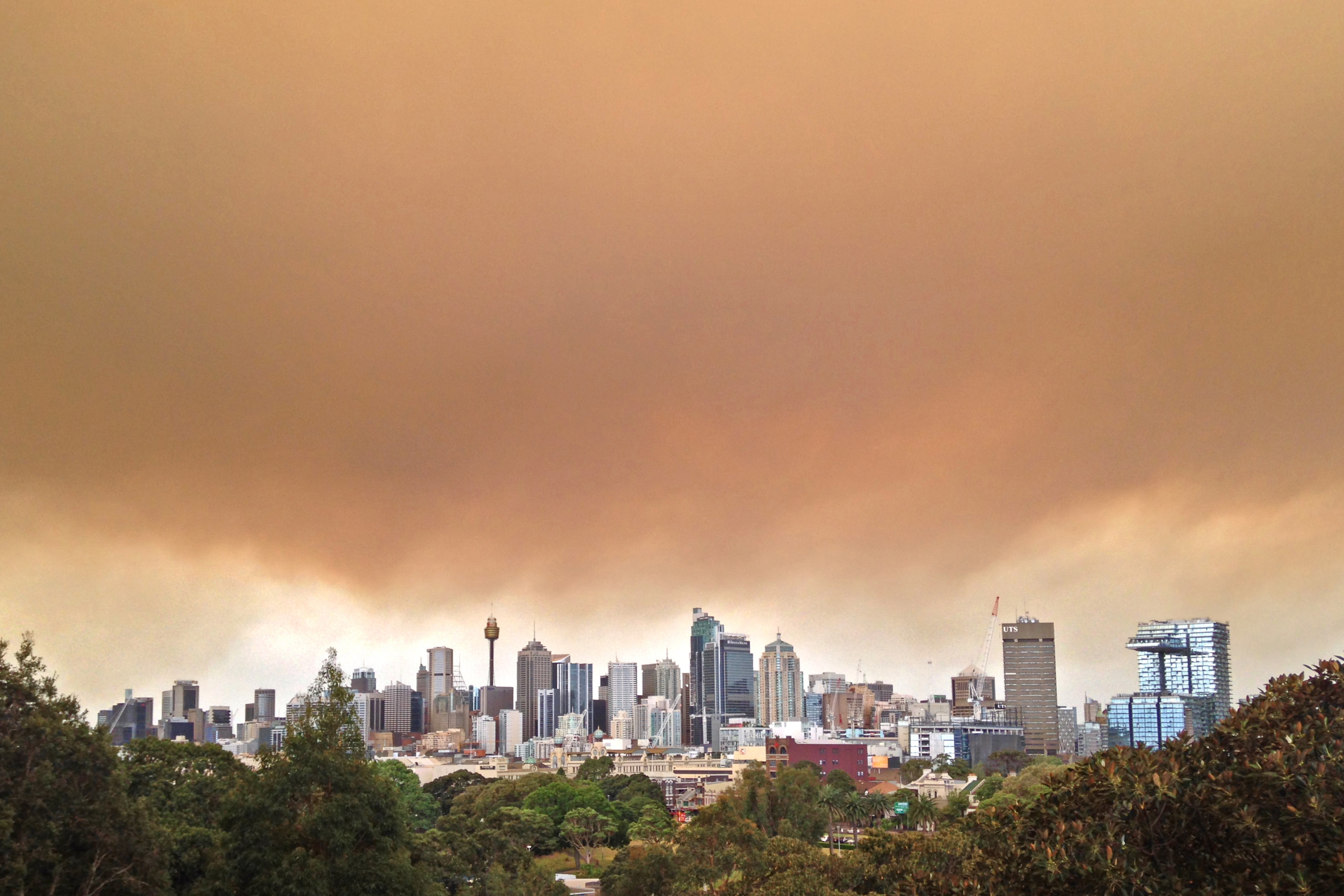
Sydney skyline in bushfire haze, October 2013

- On 17 December 1901, after the temperature reached 44.5 °C (112.1 °F), a major bushfire started from what is now Fairfield Heights through to the railway line at Canley Vale, where it destroyed many houses in its path and also annihilated acres of vines and orchards between St Johns Park and Fairfield.
- In January 1994, severe bushfires affected the Sydney basin. Homes were threatened in Turramurra by a fire in the Lane Cove River reserve, and a scrub fire had briefly cut off the holiday village of Bundeena in the Royal National Park south of Sydney. Homes were lost at Menai, Illawong, Bangor and Alfords Point.
- On 23 October 2002, drought and record maximum temperatures in eastern Australia produced a large dust storm – The storm arrived in Sydney at about 11 am, reducing visibility to a few kilometres. Previous dust storms in the city occurred in April 1994, September 1968, December 1957, and January 1942 – The most severe dust storm to hit Sydney, reducing visibility at Sydney Airport to 500 metres.
- On 23 September 2009, a dust storm that started in South Australia and inland New South Wales blanketed the city with reddish orange skies early in the morning. Originating from the north-eastern region of South Australia, the dust storm lifted thousands of tons of dirt and soil which were then dumped in Sydney Harbour and the Tasman Sea. It stretched as far north as southern Queensland and it was the worst dust storm in 70 years. During that year, Sydney experienced a number of warm winter days, dry gusty winds and another milder dust storm.
- February 2011 was the driest in 30 years with only 18 mm (0.71 in) of rain falling, which is well below the average of 118 mm (4.6 in). Some of the western suburbs recorded the lowest total February rainfall on record.
- In October 2013, major bushfires impacted western Sydney and the Blue Mountains, resulting in some evacuations, closed roads, and destroyed homes.
- The summer of 2013–14 was the driest since 1986–87, recording only 106.6 mm (4.20 in) of rain during the season, close to a third of the average of 297.7 mm (11.72 in). Observatory Hill only received 17 mm (0.67 in) of rain in January.
- September 2017 was the driest on record, with the gauge receiving only 0.2 mm (0.0079 in) of rain. Furthermore, in that year, the city received less than half of its long-term average rainfall between July and December.
- In 22 November 2018, a dust storm, stretching about 500 kilometres, swept through Sydney due to a low pressure trough and cold front that picked up dry soil in drought-ridden areas of far western NSW that week. Milder compared to the 2009 storm, the effect of the dust was still apparent across iconic locations such as the Sydney Opera House and Sydney Harbour Bridge. 2018 in Sydney has been one of the driest in a century, with the Greater Western Sydney farming region being the worst affected.
- Due to the widespread bushfires in December 2019, which even affected the western periphery of the city, the Sydney metropolitan area suffered from dangerous smoky haze for several days throughout the month, with the air quality being 11 times the hazardous level in some days, even making it worse than New Delhi's, where it was also equalled to "smoking 32 cigarettes."
- December 2019 only recorded 1.6 mm (0.063 in) of rain at Observatory Hill, overthrowing the previous 2.8 mm (0.11 in) recorded for the month in 1979.
- June 2022 was the driest in 36 years, registering only 17.2 mm (0.68 in) of rain, despite the city having the wettest first half of a year on record.
- July 2023 recorded the driest start to winter in 85 years, receiving only 22.2 mm (0.87 in) of rain since the start of June. It was the driest start to winter since 1938 and the third-driest on record since records began in 1859.
- On 14 September 2023, Sydney was ranked third-worst in the world for air quality by IQAir due to severe haze from hazard reduction burns.
- On 19 December 2023, the city was blanketed by haze and experienced poor air quality due to gusty winds bringing smoke from Pilliga forest bushfires.

== Rainstorms and windstorms ==
=== 18th–19th century ===
- On 6 February 1788, Lieutenant Ralph Clark, an officer of the First Fleet, noted that he experienced "the most violent storm of lightning and rain", where he concludes, "The lightning was incessant during the whole night and I never heard it rain faster."
- The first recorded tornado in Australia struck Sydney in 1795, during the early settlement, where it destroyed crops and trees.
- On 20 August 1857, the Dunbar, a sailing ship carrying 122 people from England, was wrecked off South Head due to a powerful east coast low while trying to seek shelter in Sydney Harbour, leaving only one survivor.
- Both in June 1816 and June 1864, the Hawkesbury River had overflowed after heavy rainfall, rising over 14 meters, where it flooded and caused widespread damage in nearby towns.
- On 22 June 1867, heavy rain and winds caused the water of the Hawkesbury River to rise to 19.2 metres, submerging and ruining 16,000 homes and buildings from Pitt Town to Wisemans Ferry. The flood caused 12 deaths, which were dramatically represented in the Illustrated Sydney News in July 1867. Survivors were on rooftops waiting to be rescued by boatmen. Known as The Great Flood, it caused damage in the order of $1.4 billion in the Nepean region and it has about a one-in-280 chance of occurring again.
- On 28 May 1889, the low-lying Inner West suburbs of Croydon Park, Canterbury and Marrickville were heavily affected by torrential rainfall. Residents were depicted in newspapers in their rowboats rescuing the homeless and rowing through the flooded streets besides partially sunken shopfronts and homes. Some suburbs, such as Prospect in the greater west, received 314.2 mm (12.4 in) of rainfall in 24 hours.

=== 20th century ===
==== 1910s–1960s ====
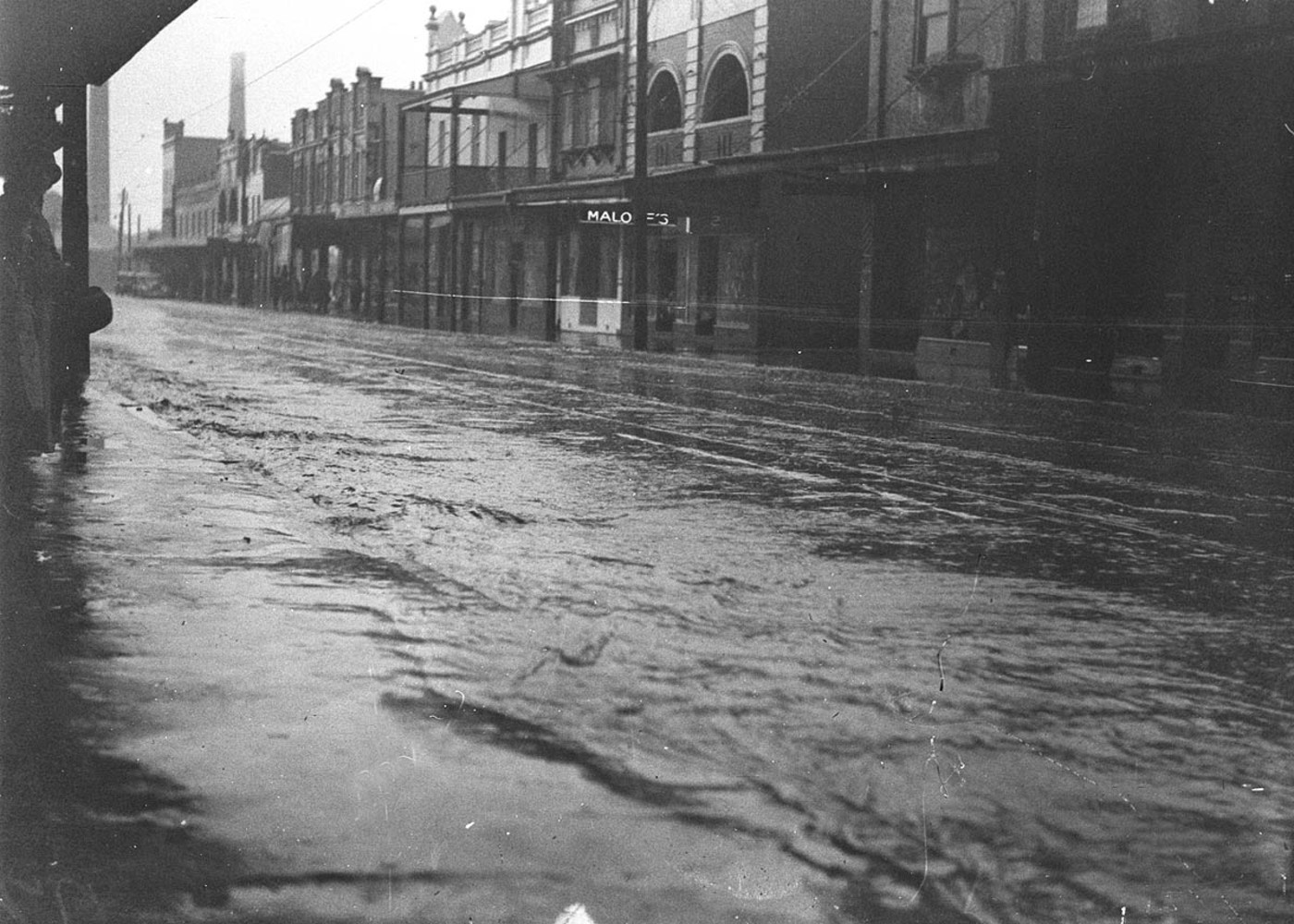
A flooded street in Alexandria after a rainstorm (September 1934)

- On 26 November 1912, a powerful hail and thunderstorm passed over Sydney, where 12.7 mm (0.50 in) of rain fell in 10 minutes flooding streets, in addition to a lightning killing one labourer at a tramway construction site.
- On 24 March 1914, Parramatta was flooded after 88.9 mm (3.50 in) of rain fell in just two hours. Parramatta railway station, businesses in Church Street and houses were partially submerged, and the Parramatta River was overflowed.
- On 25 November 1914, a severe thunderstorm which was likely accompanying a tornado, hit Sydney's northern and harbour-side suburbs, and destructed through a line of shopfronts near Lindfield railway station.
- On 6 October 1916, an east coast low brought 120.1 mm (4.73 in) of rain in 24 hours, flooding roads, overflowing rivers and damaging vegetable gardens.
- On 25 October 1919, a powerful hailstorm caused severe damage to buildings when it blocked gutters and drains, thus allowing rainwater to overspill into ceilings and basements.
- On 6 July 1931, Sydney was whipped by cyclonic winds and heavy rainfall, where it received 198.1 mm (7.80 in) of rain in 24 hours. In addition to thousands of pounds worth of damage to property, which included roofs and electricity, five deaths were recorded.
- On 25 January 1937, a tornado tore through the suburbs of Marrickville, Mascot, Botany and Matraville, where five people died and dozens were injured in falling buildings.

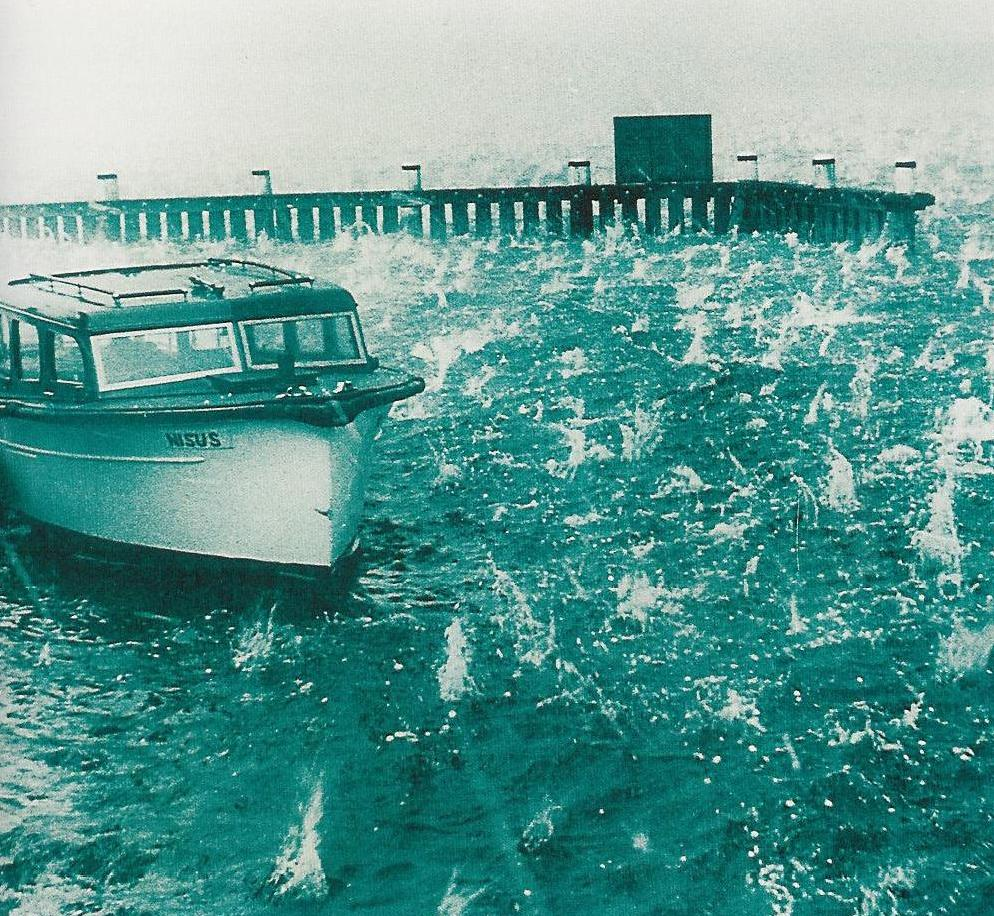
The 8 cm (3.1in) hailstones hitting the water at Rose Bay during the 1947 hailstorm

- On 31 October 1940, a tornado created a 19 km (12 mi) path of damage, where it tore through thousands of homes, killing two people. A gust of 153 km/h was recorded.
- In the 1947 Sydney hailstorm, which occurred on 1 January 1947, a storm cell developed on the morning of New Year's Day, over the Blue Mountains, hitting the city and dissipating east of Bondi in the mid-afternoon. At the time, it was the most severe storm to strike the city since recorded observations began in 1792. The high humidity, temperatures and weather patterns of Sydney increased the strength of the storm. The cost of damages from the storm were, at the time, approximately GB£750,000 (US$3 million); this is the equivalent of around A$45 million in modern figures. The supercell dropped hailstones larger than 8 centimetres (3.1 in) in diameter, with the most significant damage occurring in the central business district and eastern suburbs of Sydney.
- On 15 June 1949, 94.1 mm (3.70 in) of rain fell in just one hour, the highest at that time since the records began. Flash flooding swamped businesses, shopfronts and homes.
- In June 1950, a series of east coast cyclones develop off the New South Wales coast during which Sydney registered its highest monthly rainfall on record, 642.7 mm (25.3 in).
- On 26 July 1952, Sydney CBD received 203.2 mm (8.00 in) of rain and cyclonic winds caused local floods, two landslides in the north, traffic delays and as well as a death of a man.
- On 10 February 1956, heavy rain caused the Georges River to overflow, which led to five deaths, flooding 1,000 homes and leading to the evacuation of 8,000 people. Homes in Bankstown, Panania, East Hills, Milperra, Moorebank and the surrounds were submerged. Stranded residents were rescued by the police, the army and by civilians in row boats.
- On 9 July 1957, a tornado squall occurred at Warriewood and Narrabeen on the Northern Beaches that blew off house roofs and caused more than £40,000 ($80,000) worth of damage.
- On 23 November 1961, Penrith was flooded, with many properties and businesses being destroyed, after receiving half its annual average rainfall in just two days. The Nepean River reached a height of 9.7 m (31.82 ft) after the area received 546 mm (21.5 in) of rain in two days.

==== 1970s–1990s ====
- On 24 April 1974, the western suburbs endured severe flash flooding that resulted in $20 million worth of damage and one death, as a consequence of 200 mm (7.87 in) of rain falling in three days.
- On 10 March 1975, Sydney Airport received 174.7 mm (6.88 in) of rainfall in six hours, in addition to flash flooding which caused more than $15 m worth of damage.
- On 10 November 1976, intense thunderstorms caused severe damage in around Lidcombe and Auburn, with tennis-ball size (6 cm) hail and violent winds that injured 10 people. Damage costs were $40 million.
- On 10–11 February 1978, a tornado tore through many homes in the Lower North Shore, injuring eight people. The damage cost was $15 million.
- Between 19 and 24 March 1978, after an intense low pressure cell developed on the Coral Sea, travelling southwards, heavy rainfall occurred in the east coast which overflowed the Hawkesbury River, thereby flooding nearby homes and damaging roads. Several weather stations in the Sydney metropolitan area reported daily rainfall totals in excess of 250 mm (9.84 in).
- On 8 November 1984, Sydney CBD saw 235 mm (9.25 in) of rain with 120.3 mm (4.74 in) falling at Observatory Hill in just one hour. Causing damage to homes in the Sydney Harbour and burying vehicles in mud, the storm was caused by a coastal trough with very high humidity values which in turn spawned very slow moving thunderstorms. The cost of damages from the storm were, at the time, $80 million.
- On 6 August 1986, a record 327.6 mm (12.90 in) of rainfall was dumped on the city in 24 hours, causing severe floods, major traffic problems and damage in many parts of the metropolitan area.
- On 3 October 1986, ten people were injured and hundreds of homes were damaged after a hail up to 6 cm size hit the western suburbs. The total damage bill was $161 million.

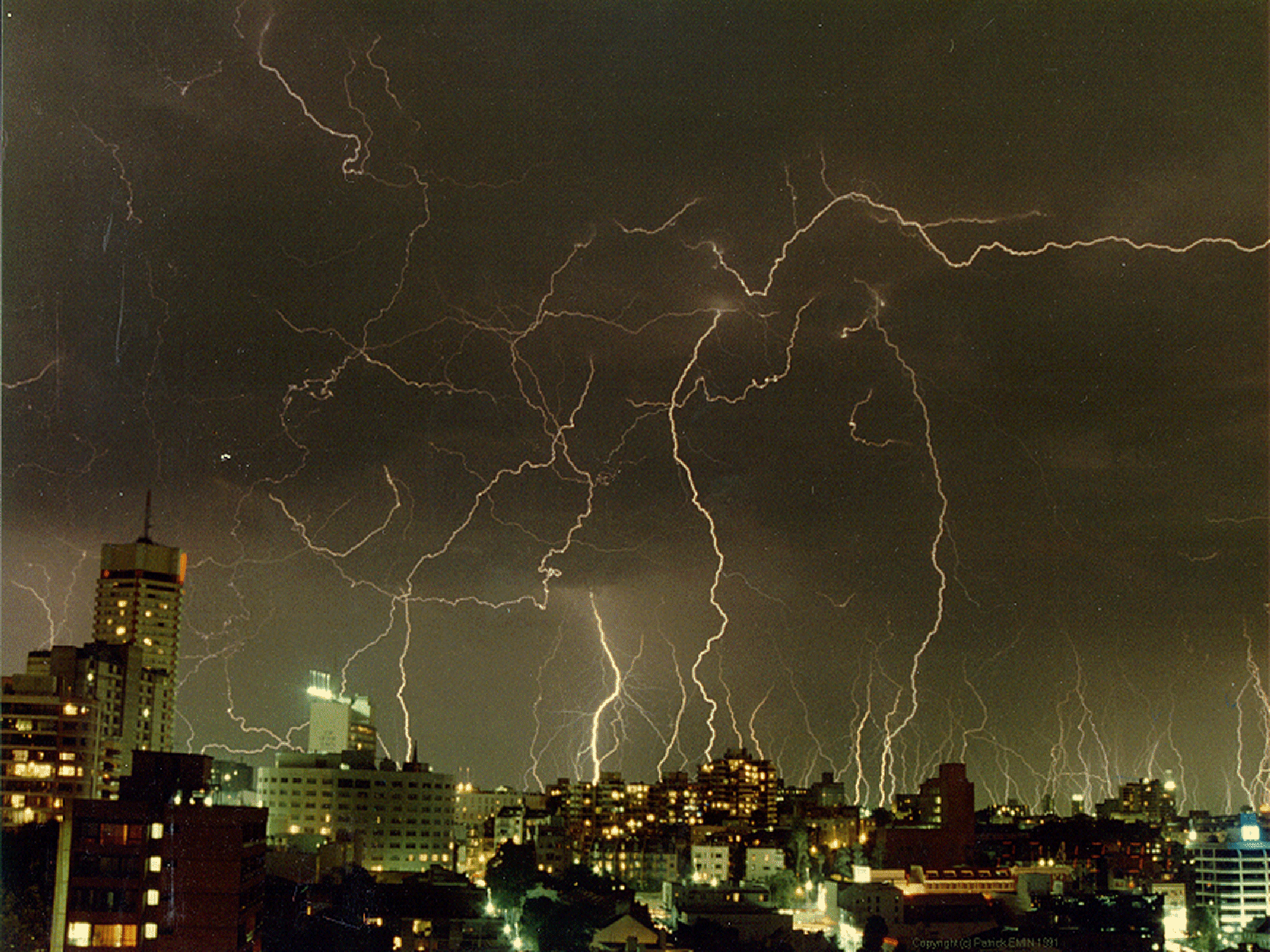
A lightning storm over Potts Point in 1991

- On 3 February 1990, Sydney CBD received its record 24-hour February rainfall at 243.6 mm (9.59 in), when ex-tropical cyclone Nancy was centred on Brisbane.
- On 18 March 1990, in around Auburn and Bankstown, large hail up to 8 cm diameter with strong winds and flash flooding caused $550 million worth of damage, where more than 2000 houses had window and roof damage.
- On 21 January 1991, the Northern Sydney area (Turramurra, Pymble and the surrounds) received hail 7 cm in size with winds up to 230 km/h, and as well as 60 mm (2.36 in) of rain in 30 minutes. With a damage cost of $670 million, the storm event damaged over 7000 houses from felled trees and floods.
- On 12 February 1992, in the western and northern suburbs, a storm caused $335 million worth of damage after rain, large hail and flash flooding battered over 500 houses.
- On 20 November 1994, a severe storm caused $29 million worth of damage in the Sydney region, namely in the north, where many trees were felled and houses wrecked.
- In the early hours of 30 August 1996, an east coast low ravaged Sydney, bringing destructive winds that damaged properties and heavy rainfall that caused flash flooding and road blockage. Turramurra received 160 mm (6.30 in) of rainfall in 24 hours, Epping at 143 mm (5.63 in) and the CBD at 127 mm (5.00 in). Wind gusts up to 160 km/h were recorded. Insurance payouts due to the storm were estimated to be up to $50 million.

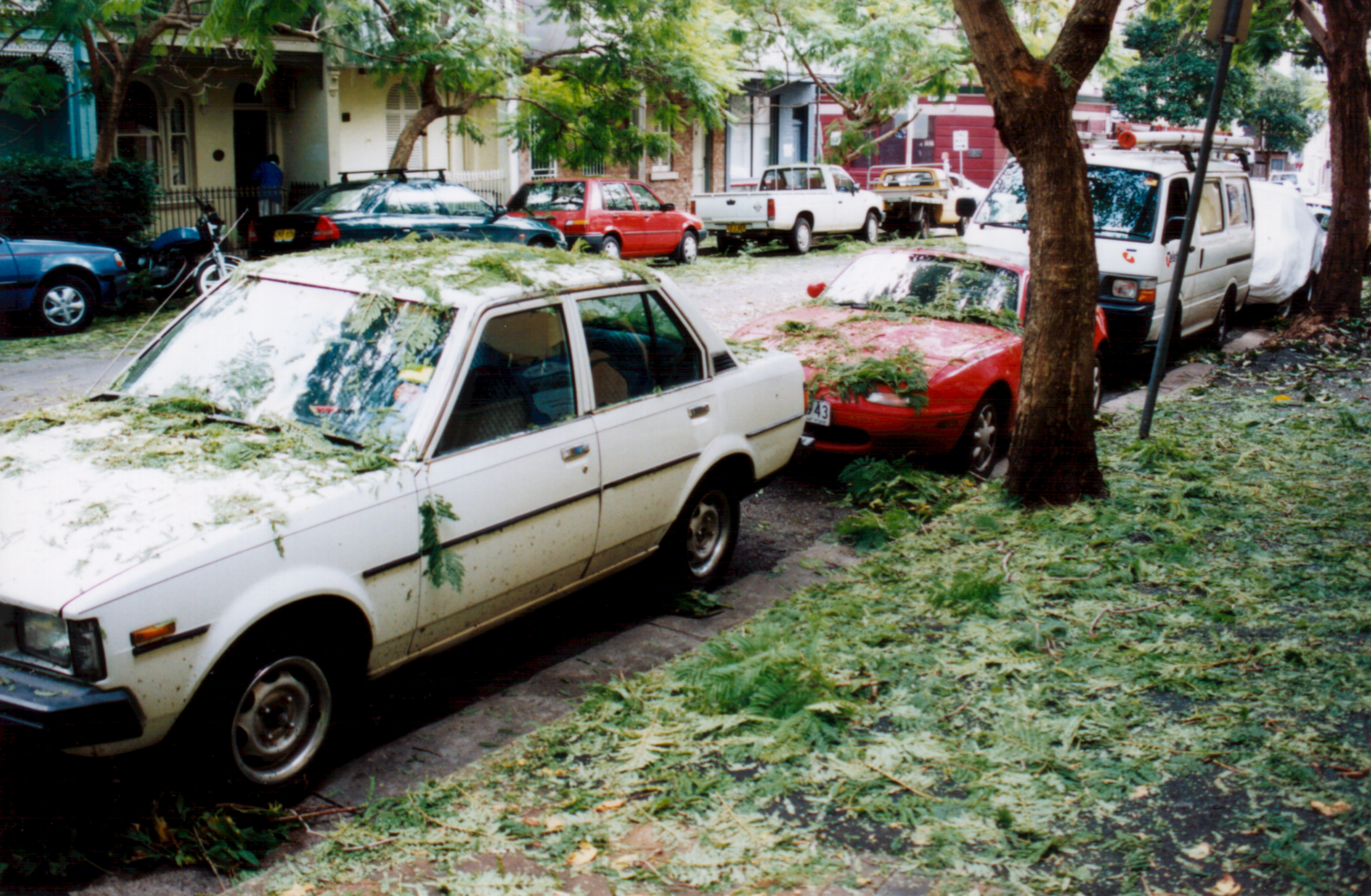
The aftermath of the 1999 hailstorm on a suburban Sydney street

- The 14 April 1999 hailstorm was a notable storm event in Sydney, which caused severe damage in many suburbs and killed one man when his boat was struck by lightning. The storm produced hailstones of up to 9 cm (3.5 in) in diameter and resulted in insurance losses of around A$1.7 billion in less than five hours.

=== 21st century ===
==== 2000s–2010s ====
- On 3 December 2001, the state of New South Wales recorded a wind gust of 174 km/h during a freak thunderstorm in Richmond. In addition, two schoolchildren were killed after a tree fell on their tent in the northern suburbs.
- A major storm in early June 2007 brought over 500 mm (19.69 in) of rainfall in 5 days in the Sydney CBD and the eastern suburbs.
- On 9 December 2007, a powerful thunderstorm affected western Sydney with hail 7 cm in diameter. The State Emergency Service received over 6000 calls for assistance and the damage bill was $201 million.
- On 18 November 2013, an EF1 tornado hit Hornsby, a suburb in the Upper North Shore, where winds reached 140 kilometres per hour (87 mph). The tornado's path was 2 km (1.2 mi) long and 50 m (160 ft) wide. Blowing off roofs and toppling large trees, the tornado injured a total of 12 people.
- On 15 October 2014, a rainstorm described as a "once-in-a-decade event" hit the Sydney region. Parts of Sydney received the heaviest amount of rain in a span of hours in decades. 94 mm (3.70 in) of rain fell in Strathfield in just over three hours. The winds were cyclonic in nature, with Sydney Airport having over 107 km/h (66 mph) gusts, reaching Category 1 strength. This event happened due to the formation of an east coast low, which ignited several other low pressure systems.

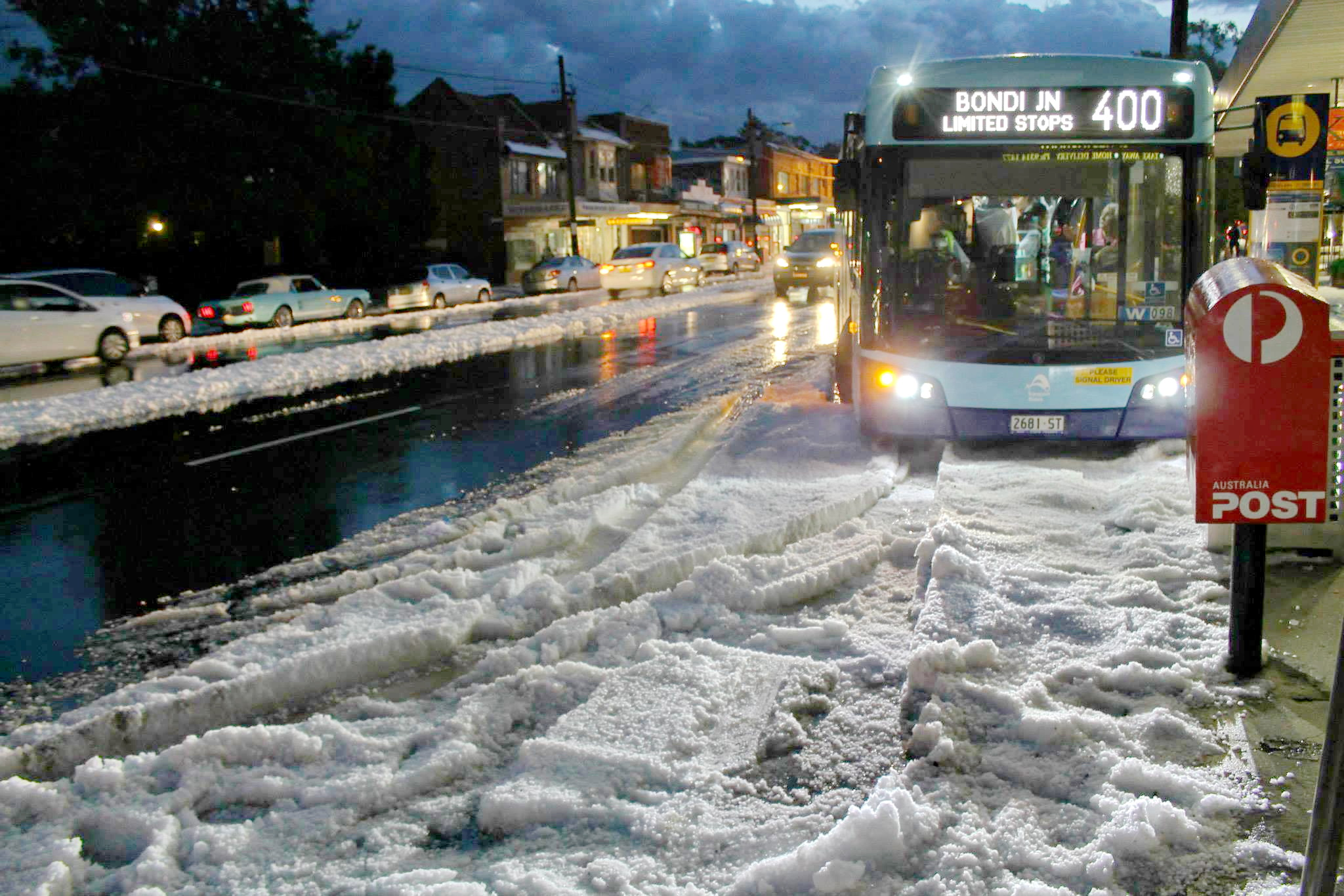
More than 50cm of hail was dumped on 25 April 2015, turning streets into snow fields (Pagewood).

- On 20 April 2015, Sydney recorded 119.4 mm (4.70 in) of rainfall, the most in any day since February 2002. Winds were "cyclonic" in nature, reaching 135 km/h (84 mph). Killing three people, this east coast low was formed with "a really pronounced upper level trough of cold air that had moved in from Victoria", Mr Sharpe said. The maximum temperature was only 15.4 °C (60 °F), making it the coldest April day since 1983, according to BOM.
- On 16 December 2015, a tornado with a windspeed of 213 km/h tore along Sydney's southern coast, where it ripped off roofs, destroyed homes and overturned trucks. Kurnell and Bondi Junction were the most hard hit.
- On 5 June 2016, an east coast low brought heavy rainfall that passed the average total June rainfall of 132 mm (5.20 in). The deluge led to flash floods across the city and caused coastal erosion, in addition to five deaths being reported. Bankstown received its highest daily rainfall in 15 years, with 141 mm (5.55 in) of rain within the 24 hours. Meanwhile, Pennant Hills, Sydney Airport and Prospect Reservoir experienced their wettest June day since 1991.
- On 28 November 2018, a number of suburbs in the Sydney CBD recorded over 100 mm (3.94 in) of rainfall in just two hours from thunderstorms that formed due to an intense low pressure system, which came from the west, in what's been the city's wettest November day since 1984. The heavy deluge caused flash flooding, submerging cars in the suburb of Redfern, alongside wind gusts that peaked over 90 km/h, which brought down trees and also contributed to the deaths of two people. In Mosman on the North Shore 111 mm (4.37 in) of rain fell by 9 am, making it the wettest spot in Sydney that day.
- On 9 January 2019, Sydney was hit by a lightning storm that was "one of the biggest in recent years", where several houses were struck. Blacktown was the worst affected by the lightning storm, with over 20 homes reporting roof damage.

==== 2020s–present ====
- Between 7 and 9 February 2020, the Sydney metropolitan area received its heaviest rain in 30 years. The storm brought vast flooding and strong winds that caused commuter chaos and left over 100,000 homes without power. The city recorded around 391.6 mm (15.42 in) of rain within those three days, more than three times the average rainfall for February. Thousands of people living in depressed areas, such as those in Narrabeen and southwest of Sydney near Georges River, were told to evacuate due to billowing floodwaters and rising river levels. At least 200 people were rescued by emergency services during the stormy weekend. Warragamba Dam, which was only at 42% in capacity, reached as close to 70% after the deluge. The last time more than 300 mm (11.81 in) of rain fell in two days in the city was in 1992, in addition to being the wettest four-day period since 1990.
- In the late evening of 18 February 2020, over 60,000 lightning strikes hit the Sydney area, with wind gusts over 100 km/h (62 mph) being recorded in some Sydney suburbs. In addition to a man being killed by a flying gas cylinder in The Rocks, the storm toppled trees, damaged properties and left tens of thousands of homes without power.

Floodwaters swamp a picnic area in Penrith during the March 2021 New South Wales floods.

- Between 17 and 23 March 2021, many parts of Sydney received heavy rainfall in a storm that was described as "dangerous and threatening" by the Bureau of Meteorology, killing two people in the metropolitan area. 330.5 mm (13.01 in) and 359.2 mm (14.14 in) of rain fell in Sydney CBD and Penrith, respectively, in a span of six days, which led to mass floods. In Chester Hill, a tornado damaged homes and toppled trees, leaving thousands without electricity. Parramatta received enough rain to flood the site of the new Parramatta Powerhouse and as well as the Parramatta ferry wharf, which was overflowed after Parramatta River broke its banks. Moreover, the Warragamba Dam began to spill, which was the first significant overflow of the reservoir since 1990. Because of rising floodwaters, Nepean River and Hawkesbury River were overflowed, with areas in the suburbs nearby such as Richmond, Windsor and Penrith being evacuated. The BOM had confirmed that flooding from Hawkesbury River was higher than a similar major flooding event in November 1961.
- On 19 December 2021, a storm with extreme winds of 130 km/h (81 mph) quickly swept across multiple suburbs in the Northern Beaches area. The storm caused a large amount of damage to property and powerlines, mostly due to trees toppling over from the wind, around 36,000 homes were left without power. In Narrabeen, three people were struck by a tree in a parking lot, causing the death of one woman and leaving two others critically injured. Volunteers from NSW SES worked alongside Fire and Rescue New South Wales and New South Wales Rural Fire Service to cleanup the damage left behind by the storm.
- On 3–8 March 2022, thousands of people in parts of western Sydney were told to evacuate as the Hawkesbury River, Nepean River and Georges rivers began to rise after 174mm of rain fell over in Warragamba in less than 24 hours on the 3rd. There was major flooding in North Richmond and Windsor as the rising river waters submerged many parts of these rural suburbs. On the 8th, a heavy deluge inundated streets in parts of southwestern Sydney and far western Sydney, killing two people in a car. Areas near the Georges River and Manly Dam were placed under an evacuation order by the State Emergency Service as floodwaters began to rise that day. On this day, Mona Vale recorded 72 mm (2.83 in) in just two hours and Mosman received 128 mm (5.04 in) in the six hours until the afternoon. Sydney recorded its wettest March on record with the rain gauge picking up 554 mm (21.81 in) of rain, beating 521.4 mm (20.53 in) from 1942 – this also brought Sydney's annual total up to 1,076.2 mm (42.37 in), which is the highest January-to-March total in records that date back to 1859.
- On 6–7 April 2022, after two days of heavy rain, residents in Woronora, Camden, Wallacia and Chipping Norton were issued with a flood evacuation order as the Woronora, Nepean and Georges Rivers began to rise. Streets in Manly Vale and Casula were heavily flooded, with roads to them being cut off. 107 mm (4.21 in) of rainfall was recorded in Little Bay in just six hours, as well as 107 mm (4.21 in) at Cronulla in just three hours overnight. There were 25 flood rescues during the 24 hours of this event, with one death in Cobbitty.
- Between 3–5 July 2022, an east coast low brought around eight months of rain in four days in Sydney's southwest, causing major flood and evacuation orders, in addition to one death. Camden, in Sydney's southwest, had received 197.4 mm (7.77 in) of rain between 2 and 3 July, with Sydney CBD accumulating 148.6 mm (5.85 in) over the span of four days. Sydney recorded its wettest July on record that year where 404 mm (15.91 in) of rain fell during the month, surpassing the July 1950 record.
- Between 5 and 6 April 2024, a black nor'easter dumped heavy rain in the Sydney region, killing one man in western Sydney. The deluge caused major public transport delays and flooding in the Northern Beaches. Penrith recorded its heaviest 24-hour rainfall on record for April at 167 mm (6.57 in).
- Between 17 and 18 January 2025, severe thunderstorms and gusty winds of up to 120 km/h (75 mph) uprooted trees—many of which fell on properties—destroyed power lines, tore iron from rooftops, and caused a landslide in northern Sydney. The impacts resulted from a combination of an offshore low-pressure system associated with ex-Tropical Cyclone Koji and a coastal trough off the north coast. SES crews responded to approximately 2,000 calls for assistance, while two women and one man were injured. Those affected received government support to repair homes, replace lost belongings, and secure emergency accommodation.
- On 5 September, a jumping castle became airborne at Gardiner Park in Banksia during strong winds. Two four-year-old children suffered minor head injuries and an 18-month-old infant was also injured; all three were taken to Sydney Children's Hospital in a stable condition.

== Temperature extremes ==
Highest monthly average high temperature
Parameter	Jan	Feb	March	April	May	June	July	Aug	Sept	Oct	Nov	Dec
Sydney CBD	29.6 °C (85.3 °F) (2017, 2019)	29.0 °C (84.2 °F) (1998)	27.1 °C (80.8 °F) (2006)	26.1 °C (79.0 °F) (2018)	23.2 °C (73.8 °F) (2014)	20.3 °C (68.5 °F) (1957)	19.9 °C (67.8 °F) (2018)	21.3 °C (70.3 °F) (1995)	24.4 °C (75.9 °F) (1988)	26.2 °C (79.2 °F) (1988)	26.6 °C (79.9 °F) (2019)	28.6 °C (83.5 °F) (2005)
Bankstown Airport (Western Sydney)	32.3 °C (90.1 °F) (2019)	30.8 °C (87.4 °F) (2017)	28.8 °C (83.8 °F) (1998)	27.8 °C (82.0 °F) (2018)	23.4 °C (74.1 °F) (2016)	19.7 °C (67.5 °F) (2004)	20.0 °C (68.0 °F) (2018)	21.9 °C (71.4 °F) (1995)	25.4 °C (77.7 °F) (2013)	27.6 °C (81.7 °F) (1988)	28.6 °C (83.5 °F) (2009)	30.8 °C (87.4 °F) (2017)
Penrith (Far-West)	34.8 °C (94.6 °F) (2018)	32.7 °C (90.9 °F) (2004)	30.5 °C (86.9 °F) (1998)	28.6 °C (83.5 °F) (2018)	23.5 °C (74.3 °F) (2016)	20.1 °C (68.2 °F) (2004)	20.3 °C (68.5 °F) (2018)	21.9 °C (71.4 °F) (2009)	26.3 °C (79.3 °F) (2013)	28.9 °C (84.0 °F) (2013)	31.8 °C (89.2 °F) (2009)	33.5 °C (92.3 °F) (2019)

Lowest monthly average high temperature
Parameter	Jan	Feb	March	April	May	June	July	Aug	Sept	Oct	Nov	Dec
Sydney CBD	23.1 °C (73.6 °F) (1948)	23.6 °C (74.5 °F) (1860)	22.4 °C (72.3 °F) (1870)	20.0 °C (68.0 °F) (1893)	16.6 °C (61.9 °F) (1898)	14.1 °C (57.4 °F) (1887)	13.4 °C (56.1 °F) (1896)	14.9 °C (58.8 °F) (1943)	17.4 °C (63.3 °F) (1889)	19.2 °C (66.6 °F) (1903)	20.6 °C (69.1 °F) (1943)	22.5 °C (72.5 °F) (1924)
Prospect Reservoir (Western Sydney)	24.0 °C (75.2 °F) (1965)	24.9 °C (76.8 °F) (1966)	22.6 °C (72.7 °F) (1967)	21.1 °C (70.0 °F) (1983)	18.1 °C (64.6 °F) (1968)	14.6 °C (58.3 °F) (1968)	14.4 °C (57.9 °F) (1966)	15.7 °C (60.3 °F) (1967)	17.6 °C (63.7 °F) (1966)	19.9 °C (67.8 °F) (1966)	22.5 °C (72.5 °F) (1971)	23.4 °C (74.1 °F) (2011)

Highest minimum (Sydney CBD)

Period	Record temperature	Date
January	26.2 °C (79 °F)	8 Jan 1994
February	27.6 °C (82 °F)	6 Feb 2011
March	25.4 °C (78 °F)	26 Mar 1876
April	24.3 °C (76 °F)	5 Apr 1986
May	20.8 °C (69 °F)	3 May 1942
June	18.4 °C (65 °F)	18 Jun 1873
July	18.1 °C (65 °F)	2 Jul 1942
August	19.7 °C (67 °F)	30 Aug 1885
September	23.0 °C (73 °F)	24 Sep 2017
October	25.6 °C (78 °F)	4 Oct 1970, 3 Oct 1981
November	25.3 °C (78 °F)	29 Nov 2020
December	27.1 °C (81 °F)	14 Dec 2016

Lowest maximum (Sydney CBD)

Period	Record temperature	Date
January	17.2 °C (63 °F)	14 Jan 1948
February	15.6 °C (60 °F)	28 Feb 1863
March	16.2 °C (61 °F)	13 Mar 1886
April	13.8 °C (57 °F)	22 Apr 1927
May	11.3 °C (52 °F)	24 May 1904
June	9.7 °C (49 °F)	13 Jun 1899
July	7.7 °C (46 °F)	19 Jul 1868
August	9.1 °C (48 °F)	9 Aug 1872
September	9.5 °C (49 °F)	8 Sep 1869
October	12.1 °C (54 °F)	2 Oct 1871
November	12.6 °C (55 °F)	16 Nov 1988
December	15.2 °C (59 °F)	24 Dec 1870

== Rainfall extremes ==
Highest daily rainfall
Parameter	Jan	Feb	March	April	May	June	July	Aug	Sept	Oct	Nov	Dec
Sydney CBD	191.0 mm (7.5 in) (17 Jan 1988)	243.6 mm (9.6 in) (3 Feb 1990)	280.7 mm (11.1 in) (28 Mar 1942)	191.0 mm (7.5 in) (29 Apr 1860)	212.3 mm (8.4 in) (28 May 1889)	150.6 mm (5.9 in) (11 Jun 1991)	198.1 mm (7.8 in) (7 Jul 1931)	327.6 mm (12.9 in) (6 Aug 1986)	144.5 mm (5.7 in) (10 Sep 1879)	161.8 mm (6.4 in) (13 Oct 1902)	234.6 mm (9.2 in) (8 Nov 1984)	126.0 mm (5.0 in) (14 Dec 1991)
Western Sydney (Prospect Reservoir)	161.2 mm (6.3 in) (31 Jan 2001)	165.0 mm (6.5 in) (10 Feb 2020)	153.9 mm (6.1 in) (20 Mar 1892)	163.1 mm (6.4 in) (16 Apr 1946)	314.2 mm (12.4 in) (28 May 1889)	163.4 mm (6.4 in) (11 Jun 1991)	143.5 mm (5.6 in) (10 Jul 1904)	321.0 mm (12.6 in) (6 Aug 1986)	96.5 mm (3.8 in) (2 Sep 1970)	102.1 mm (4.0 in) (5 Oct 1916)	126.2 mm (5.0 in) (14 Nov 1969)	154.9 mm (6.1 in) (13 Dec 1910)

Lowest monthly rainfall (Sydney CBD)

Period	Record rainfall	Year
Year	583.0 mm (22.95 in)	1888
January	5.6 mm (0.22 in)	1985
February	3.0 mm (0.12 in)	1939
March	8.4 mm (0.33 in)	1965
April	1.4 mm (0.055 in)	1868
May	3.0 mm (0.12 in)	2008
June	4.1 mm (0.16 in)	1962
July	1.8 mm (0.071 in)	1970
August	0.0 mm (0 in)	1995
September	0.2 mm (0.0079 in)	2017
October	0.6 mm (0.024 in)	1988
November	1.9 mm (0.075 in)	1915
December	1.6 mm (0.063 in)	2019

Highest monthly rainfall (Sydney CBD)

Period	Record rainfall	Year
Year	2,530.0 mm (99.61 in)	2022
January	387.1 mm (15.24 in)	1911
February	630.6 mm (24.83 in)	1990
March	554.0 mm (21.81 in)	2022
April	622.1 mm (24.49 in)	1861
May	585.0 mm (23.03 in)	1919
June	642.7 mm (25.30 in)	1950
July	404.0 mm (15.91 in)	2022
August	482.6 mm (19.00 in)	1998
September	355.8 mm (14.01 in)	1879
October	295.4 mm (11.63 in)	2022
November	517.2 mm (20.36 in)	1961
December	401.9 mm (15.82 in)	1920

Lowest monthly rainfall (Prospect Reservoir)

Period	Record rainfall	Year
Year	394.6 mm (15.54 in)	1944
January	3.9 mm (0.15 in)	1929
February	2.8 mm (0.11 in)	1902
March	5.1 mm (0.20 in)	1940
April	2.0 mm (0.079 in)	1997
May	1.2 mm (0.047 in)	2018
June	1.0 mm (0.039 in)	2001
July	0.0 mm (0 in)	1977
August	0.0 mm (0 in)	1995
September	0.0 mm (0 in)	1957
October	0.0 mm (0 in)	1988
November	0.8 mm (0.031 in)	1915
December	0.0 mm (0 in)	2019

Highest monthly rainfall (Prospect Reservoir)

Period	Record rainfall	Year
Year	1,900.0 mm (74.80 in)	1950
January	426.7 mm (16.80 in)	1951
February	519.1 mm (20.44 in)	1956
March	380.7 mm (14.99 in)	1890
April	425.0 mm (16.73 in)	2015
May	556.0 mm (21.89 in)	1889
June	531.3 mm (20.92 in)	1950
July	323.7 mm (12.74 in)	1904
August	458.5 mm (18.05 in)	1986
September	186.3 mm (7.33 in)	1892
October	269.0 mm (10.59 in)	1916
November	391.3 mm (15.41 in)	1961
December	338.1 mm (13.31 in)	1920

== See also ==
- Severe storms in Australia
- Southerly buster
- Climate of Sydney
- Black nor'easter
- East coast low
