= 2007 New South Wales storms =

Series of cataclysms in South Wales

Coordinates: 32°54′S 151°45′E

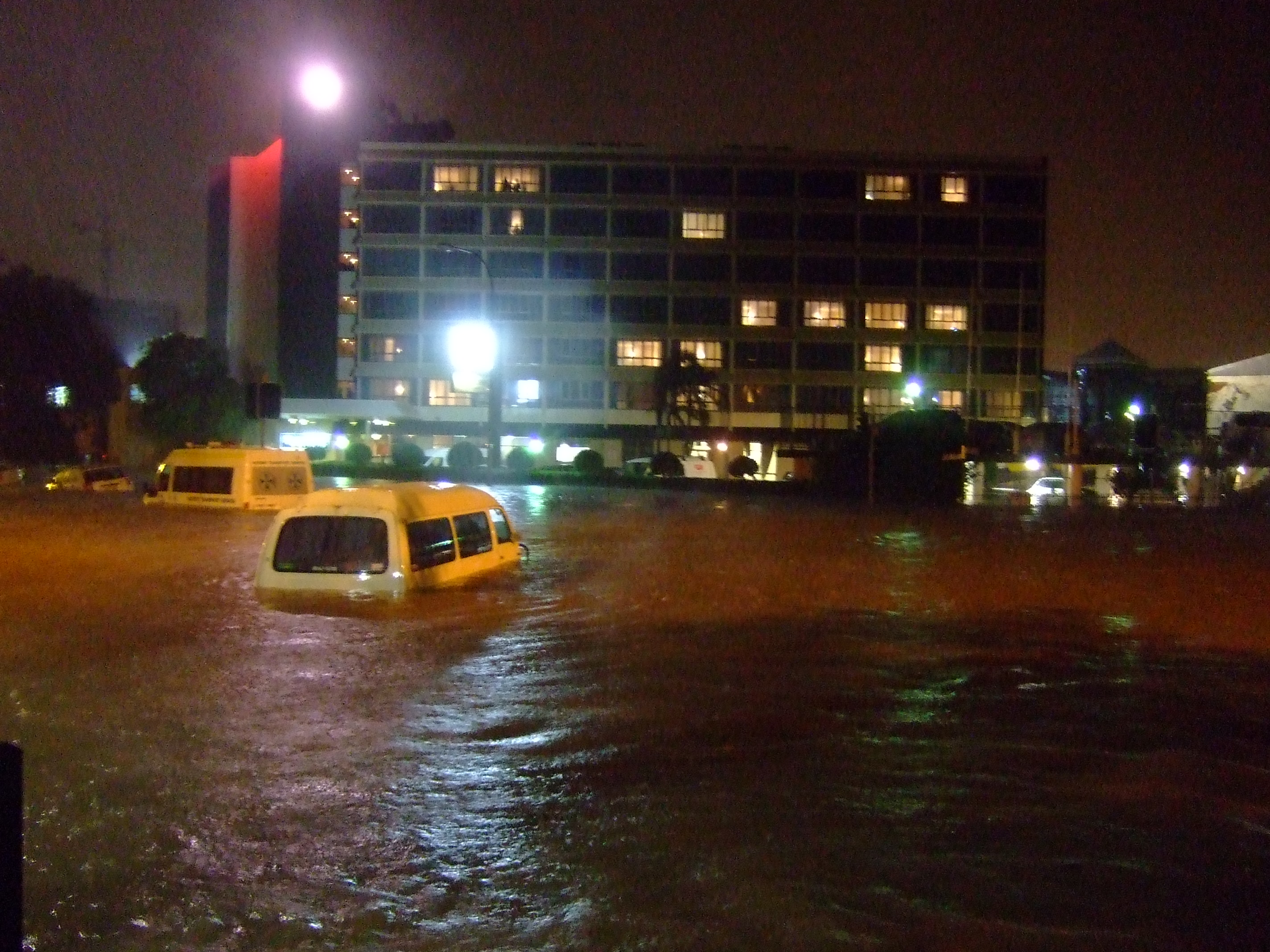
- Flooding at the corner of King and Steel streets, Newcastle

Meteorological history
- Duration: 7 June 2007 – 10 June 2007

Overall effects
- Fatalities: 10
- Areas affected: Central Coast and the Hunter

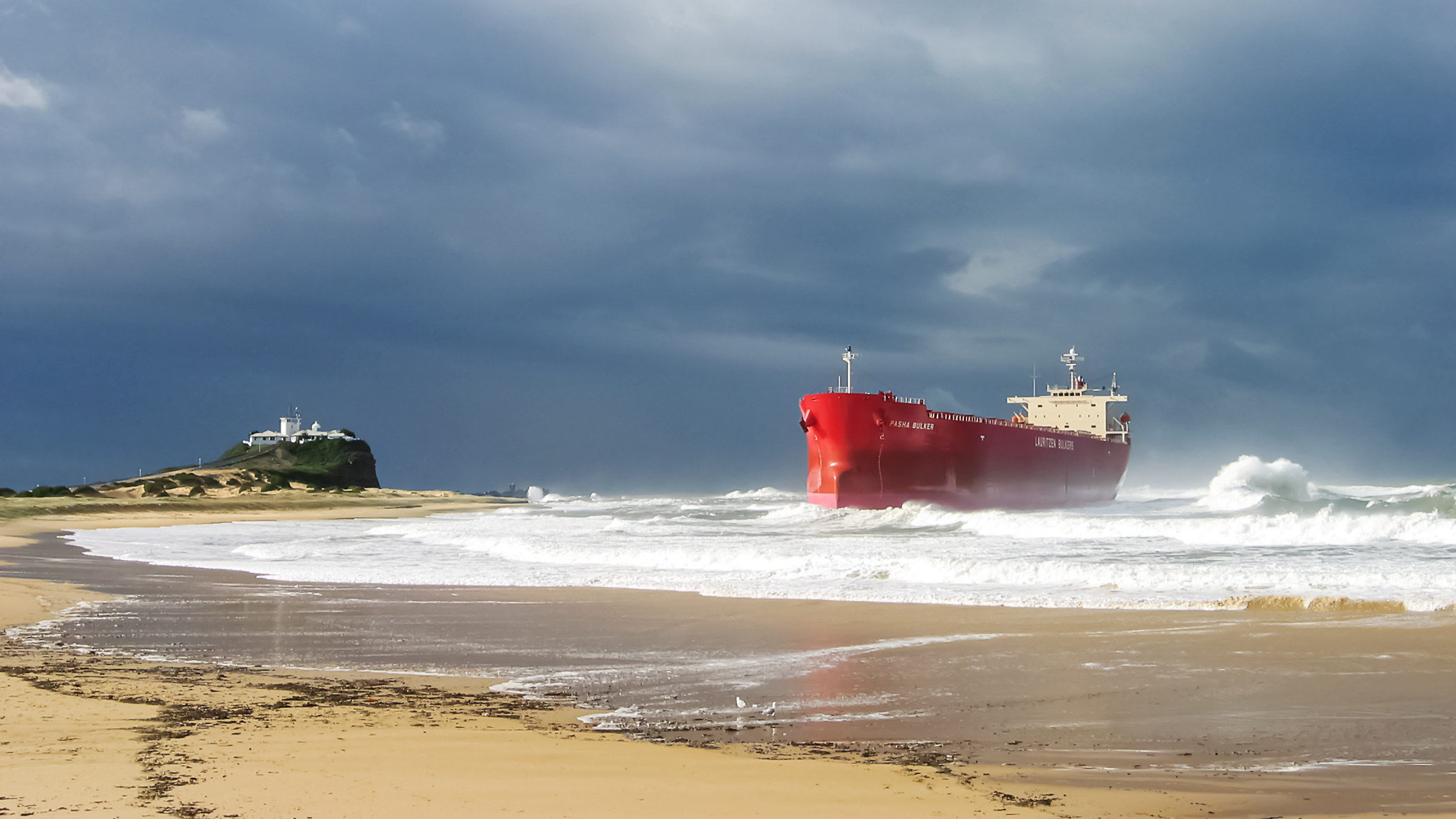
The Pasha Bulker aground on the reef at Nobbys Beach, Newcastle

The 2007 New South Wales storms started on 8 June 2007 following the development of an intense east coast low pressure system during the previous night. Over the next 36 hours, these areas were battered by the system's strong winds and torrential rain, which caused extensive flooding, damage, loss of life and the grounding of a 225 m (738 ft) long bulk carrier.

== Impact ==
The New South Wales Premier, Morris Iemma, declared a natural disaster for the affected areas. More than 105,000 homes had been left without power. Rainfall had exceeded 300 mm (12 in) in the Hunter region and 200 mm (8 in) in parts of the Central Coast and Sydney. Nearly 6,000 State Emergency Service volunteers, including crews from across New South Wales, Australian Capital Territory, Queensland and Victoria worked in the area, having responded to over 10,000 calls for assistance. The floods claimed the lives of eight people.

The strongest observed wind gusts were 135 km/h (84 mph) at Norah Head and 124 km/h (77 mph) at Newcastle.

== Aftermath ==
A family of four and a nephew were killed when a section of road collapsed under their car as they drove along the Pacific Highway at Somersby on the Central Coast. Two people died when their four-wheel drive vehicle was swept off a bridge by floodwaters at Clarence Town and a man died near Lambton when he was swept into a storm-water drain. The following day, a man died when a tree fell onto his vehicle at Brunkerville. Another man died during a house fire that, it is believed, was started by a candle being used during the blackouts caused by the storm. The total death toll rose to ten.

== Rescues ==
The unladen bulk carrier Pasha Bulker ran aground on Nobbys Beach at Newcastle, after its captain failed to heed a warning to move out to sea to escape the approaching storm. The Newcastle Westpac Life Saver Rescue Helicopter Service used both of their aircraft to winch the Pasha Bulker crew of 22 to safety, transporting them to Nobbys Beach car park. However, on completion of the rescue, the aircraft had to abandon the flight back to their Broadmeadow base due to lack of visibility and dangerously strong winds.

On the evening of Sunday 10 June, approximately 4,000 residents in riverside communities of central Maitland, South Maitland and Lorn were forced to evacuate their homes in anticipation that the Hunter River would breach its levee system. Evacuation centres were set up at East Maitland and Maitland High School. However, by the morning of 11 June, the floodwater had peaked without breaking the levee bank.

== See also ==
- Severe storms in Australia
- Severe storm events in Sydney
