= Australian east coast low =

Weather phenomenon

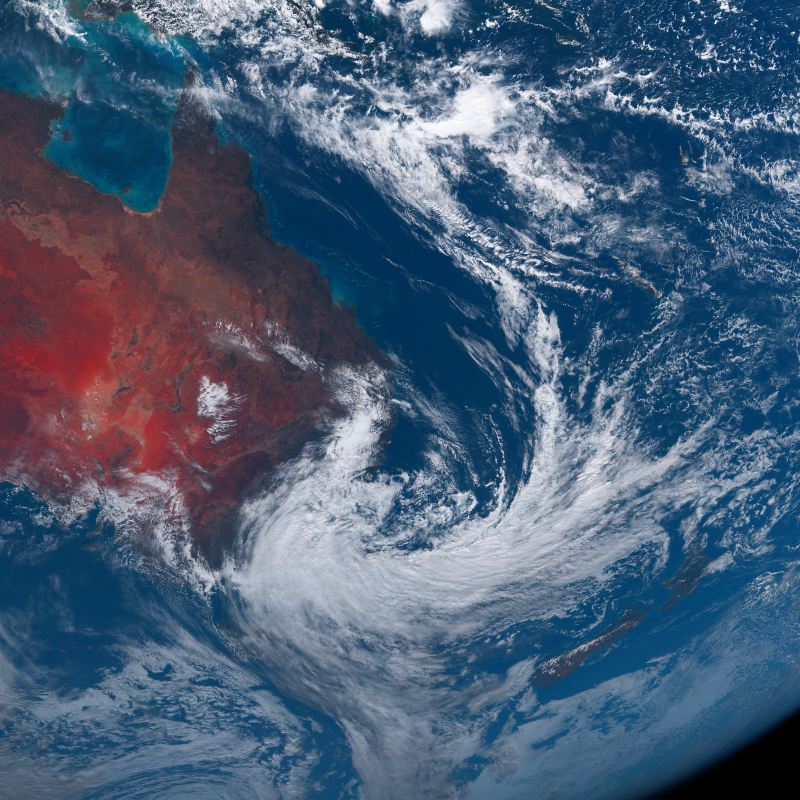
An east coast low on 27 July 2020 (Himawari 8)

Australian east coast lows (known locally as east coast lows, maritime lows, and east coast cyclones) are extratropical cyclones or low-pressure systems on the coast of southeastern Australia that may be caused by both mid-latitude and tropical influences over a variety of levels in the atmosphere. These storms should not be confused with Australian region tropical cyclones which typically affect the northern half of the continent.

The most intense of these systems have many of the characteristics of subtropical cyclones. They develop between 25° south and 40° south and within 5° of the eastern Australian coastline, mostly during autumn and early winter with a peak in June. Prior to the introduction of satellite imagery in the early 1960s, many east coast lows were classified as tropical cyclones. ECLs are responsible for more than half of all days with rainfall above 50 mm (2.0 in) in the southeastern seaboard.

== Causes ==
Generally, the low occurs when there exists a temperature contrast between the warmer Tasman Sea and cooler continental landmass (including the cold air in the upper atmosphere), a setup similar to lake-effect rain. The interaction of such airs create heavy moisture and heightened wind speed. Two thirds of the recorded low-pressure systems are fully cold core storms while the remaining third display hybrid features, which are defined by a warm core at lower levels and a cold core at upper levels. A smaller portion are fully warm core cyclones, where they transition to a tropical cyclone, as well as in part warm seclusion cyclones. Furthermore, 46% of ECLs were hybrid cyclones.

=== Development ===
An east coast low can develop in a variety of other weather conditions, including:

- A blocking high in the Tasman Sea which prevents the ECL from leaving the coastline, therefore making the system lengthy and more impactful
- From extratropical cyclones, typically in the warm season, which head south
- Sea surface temperature contrasting with the warm eddies that are found on the East Australian Current
- Rapid formation in the sea within a preexistent trough of low pressure
- Much rarely, in the wake of a cold front heading across from Victoria into the Tasman Sea (i.e. a cut-off low originally enclosed within the westerly wind band that flows around the Southern Ocean and is now displaced from the stream).
- A shallow warm core or warm separation at low levels and a cold core in the upper troposphere

== Characterisation ==
Explosive cyclogenesis is seen on average just once per year, but these storms cause significant wind and flood damage when they occur. East Coast Lows by and large have shorter lifespans than Tropical Cyclones, lasting only a few days. Australian east coast cyclones vary in size from mesoscale, around 10–100 km (6–62 mi), to synoptic scale, approximately 100–1,000 km (62–621 mi). Cold core cyclones are more predominant in the southern parts of the ECL region during the cool season, while hybrid cyclones are more regular closer to the tropics, particularly in the warm season.

Australian east coast cyclones, although variable in size and intensity, are typically characterised by widespread heavy rainfall. Rain associated damages attributed to east coast cyclones are estimated in millions to tens of million dollars annually and are a major contributor to the total weather-associated insurance losses for all of Australia. Seven per cent of all major Australian disasters since 1967 can be directly attributed to east coast cyclones.

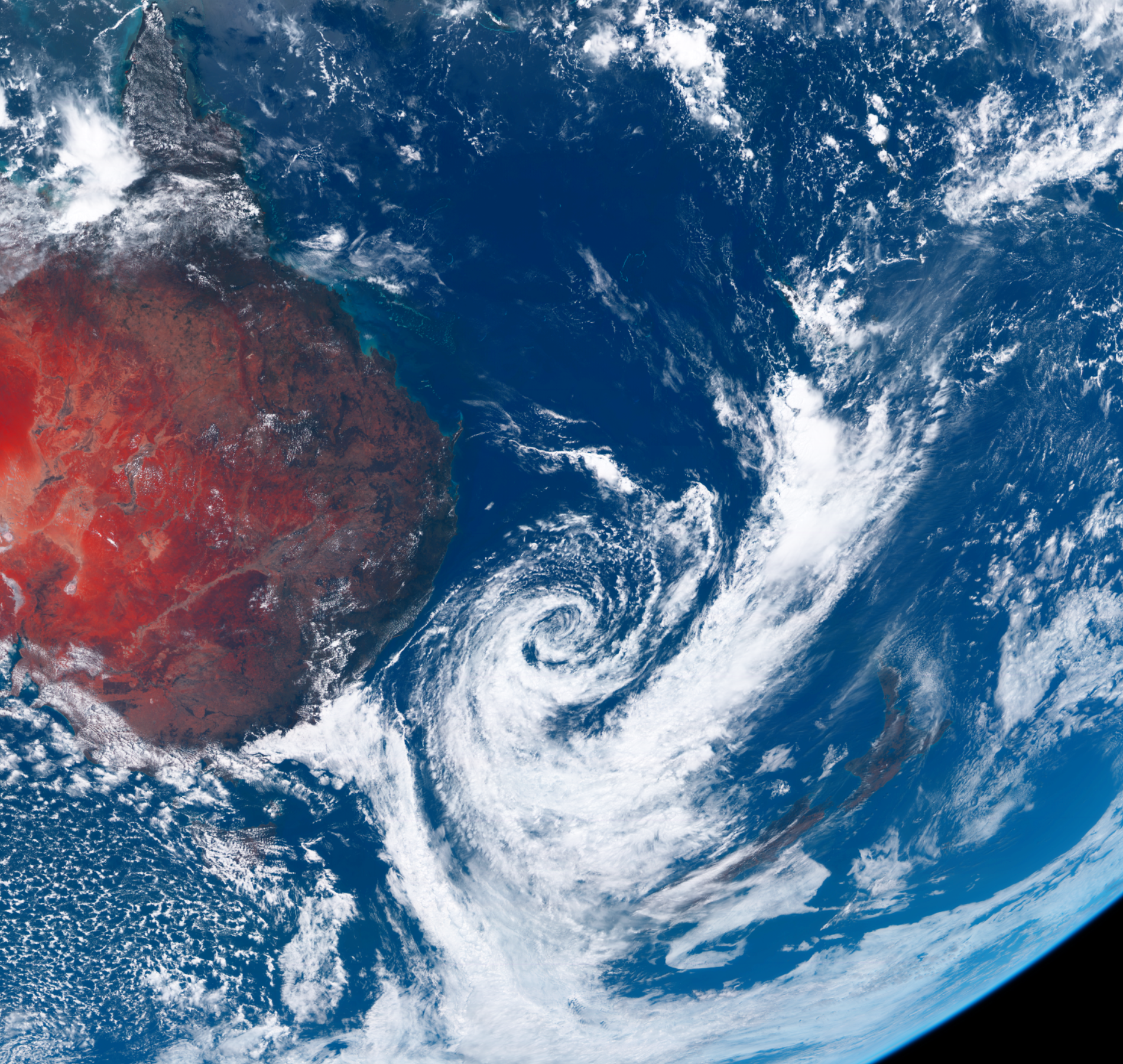
A Tasman Low off the New South Wales coast on 22 February 2021. (Himawari 8)

ECLs are the cause of more than 25% of yearly rainfall and more than 60% of days with mass coastal flooding or significant dam influxes. A Tasman Low is an offshore low that occurs around 200 km away from the coast which can cause light to moderate rainfall and gusty winds, although its effect is insignificant compared to that of an east coast low.

=== Regions ===
East coast lows usually occur along the subtropical east coast of Australia from Gladstone in Queensland to the Victoria/New South Wales border in the South Coast (near eastern Gippsland), and often affect large populated cities such as Sydney and Brisbane, between which over one-third of the Australian population resides. ECLs are generally more intense between Batemans Bay in the south to Coffs Harbour in the north, which include the Mid North Coast, Central Coast, Hunter Valley, Sydney CBD, the Illawarra, and as well as the Blue Mountains and Southern Highlands. South East Queensland, the far southern coast and Northern Rivers of New South Wales, and eastern Victoria are generally less impacted than the areas situated at the centre of the NSW coastline.

More powerful systems may percolate inland into the Central Tablelands, New England, the Central West, South Western Slopes, the Monaro and, albeit rarely, the Orana and the Riverina regions in NSW; also the Australian Capital Territory, the Hume region in Victoria; as well as Darling Downs and the Brigalow Belt in Queensland, although the rainfall in these interior areas will often be insignificant.

=== Pattern ===
In a June 2007 observation by the Bureau of Meteorology, there were about ten significant maritime lows with an "explosive development" usually occurring once per year. More recently, it was observed that around 22 east coast lows were recorded annually – around 2 to 3 causing daily rainfall above 100 mm (3.9 in) and 7–8 causing daily rain above 25 mm (0.98 in). A Black nor'easter, which occurs in the warm months in eastern New South Wales, can intensify as it heads south and turn into an east coast low.

The incidence of these types of storms can be seen to fluctuate quite widely from one year to the next, with none in some years and the highest incidence being twelve in 1978/79. Another feature of east coast low development is the tendency for clustering of events when conditions remain favourable. For example, near Brisbane, almost one third of events occur within 20 days of a preceding event. Areas south of the low can experience heavy rain, while those at the north of the rotating low would experience sunny skies. The movement of the low pressure system is generally difficult to predict for weather forecasters.

Correlations of east coast cyclones with the interannual differences of the Southern Oscillation Index (SOI) indicate a strong preference for these storms to form just after a large swing from negative to positive Southern Oscillation index values and especially between swings from negative SOI the year before and positive SOI the year after. This suggests a preference for formation of east coast cyclones between extreme events of the Southern Oscillation Index. A positive SAM is linked with a higher frequency of deep cyclones in August–October and of shallow upper cyclones in December–February.

== Examples ==
- 30 June–3 July 2025. A strong East Coast Low caused severe flooding in parts of Eastern NSW, including Sydney
- 2022 east coast lows

- 2–7 July 2022. Severe flooding in parts of Western Sydney and the Hunter Region, in addition to 1 death and thousands of evacuations. (See 2022 New South Wales floods)
- 7–8 March 2022. 22 deaths. (See 2022 eastern Australia floods)

- 9–13 June 2021. 2 deaths. Widespread flash flooding across Gippsland in Victoria. 160,000 properties blacked out. Traralgon in the Latrobe Valley was one of the hardest-hit towns with 200 homes evacuated. The rainfall event was actually caused by a cut-off low that "had similar characteristics to an East Coast low".
- 26–28 July 2020.
- 5–6 June 2016 An east coast low combined with a King tide brought severe coastal damage, notably to Collaroy and Coogee, New South Wales along with flooding along the east coast and later severe flooding to Tasmania.

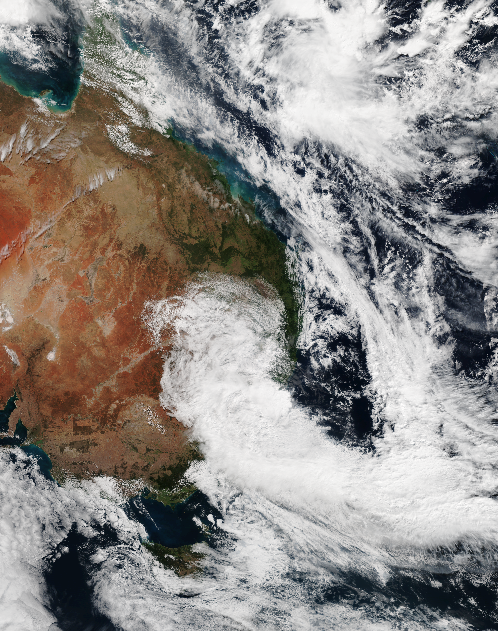
Suomi NPP satellite image of an east coast low 21 April 2015

- 2015 Australian east coast lows

- 23–25 August, An unusual low formed late in the season bringing some flooding along the coast. 390 millimetres (15 in) of rainfall was recorded at Nowra in 48 hours.
- 28 April–1 May – On 28 April the Bureau of Meteorology reported that an east coast low was forming off the coast of Fraser Island. Record breaking rainfall and strong winds were recorded in southeast Queensland and northern New South Wales causing 5 fatalities in the Caboolture area.
- 20–23 April At least 4 people died in an event that was described as the worst since 2007. Severe flooding affected the areas of Maitland and Dungog, inundating homes and isolating entire communities. Power and water access was restricted for tens of thousands of homes across the wider Hunter Region.

- 14 October 2014, New South Wales saw wind gusts up to 161 km/h (100 mph). A Bureau of Meteorology spokesman described the rainfall observed at Marrickville, Canterbury, and Sydney Airport as "probably what you'd expect to see in one location about once every 20 years", with rainfall totals in Strathfield at 94 mm (4 in) falling in three hours described as a one in 100 years recurrence. Sydney Airport saw disruption to flights as the airport closed for a time due to high winds. In Port Botany the strong winds caused the Hapag-Lloyd cargo ship Kiel Express to break free. Waves off Sydney over 8 m (26 ft) were reported. 30,000 homes in the region were left without power.
- June 2013
- 21 May 2009, an east coast low caused massive coastal erosion and major flooding of the Clarence River.

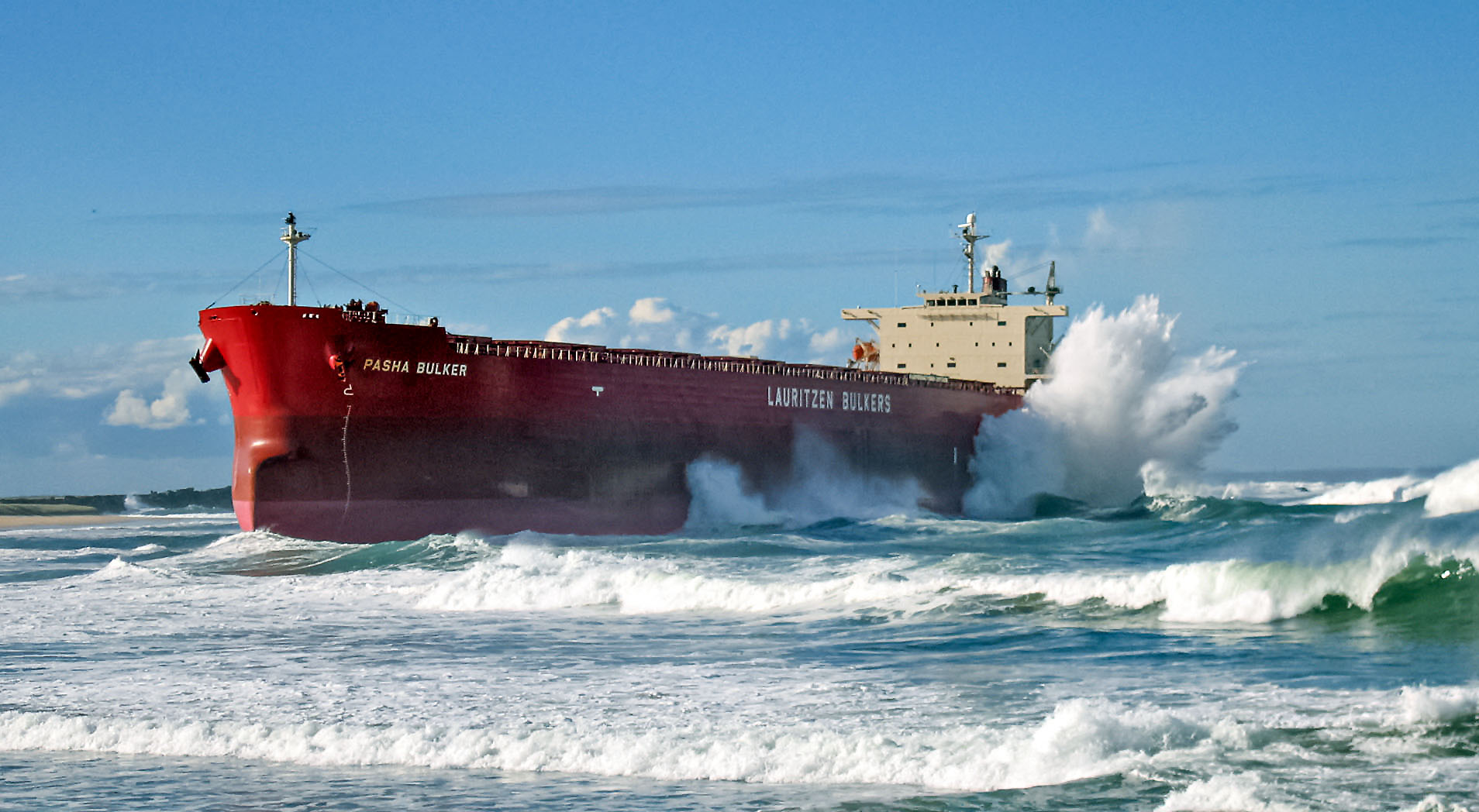
Pasha Bulker stranded by an east coast cyclone on Nobbys Beach, Newcastle June 2007

- June 2007 June 2007 Hunter Region and Central Coast storms the grounding of the bulk coal-carrying ship MV Pasha Bulker, ten deaths and insurance claims of around A$1.4 billion making it one of the most costly natural disasters in Australia's history. 2007 saw five east coast cyclones develop off Australia's east coast.
- 9 July 2005
- 23 March 2005
- 2 October 2004, off Sydney
- 27–28 July 2001
- 27–28 December 1998, a notorious case of explosive development in eastern Australia, the Sydney–Hobart yacht race cyclone resulted in the death of six race participants.
- 7–8 August 1998, parts of Sydney and the Illawarra region received in excess of 300 mm (12 in) of rain over four days.
- 30–31 August 1996, cost at least two lives and caused almost A$20 million in damage. Heavy rain and strong to gale-force winds with extreme gusts of 64 kn (119 km/h; 74 mph) at Wollongong and 53 kn (98 km/h; 61 mph) near Sydney Airport.
- September 1995, A$8 million damage.
- August 1990, two lows in early August cause A$12 million damage.
- 5 August 1986, 24-hour rainfall totals: over 300mm in the Sydney area. Sydney's Observatory Hill recorded 327.91 mm (12.91 in) of rain, an all-time daily record for the location.
- 17–23 July 1984, A$53m insurance costs.
- 26 May 1974, storm saw the shipwreck of the MV Sygna.
- 6 July 1973, the cargo ship Cherry Venture ran aground on Teewah Beach in South East Queensland during the storm.
- June 1967, a series of east coast cyclones had a major impact on the northern New South Wales and southern Queensland coasts.
- June 1950, a series of east coast cyclones develop off the New South Wales coast during which Sydney registered its highest monthly rainfall on record, 642.7 mm (25.3 in).
- 20 August 1857, the Dunbar sunk near Sydney, with only one survivor.

== See also ==
- East Australian Current
- Southerly buster
- Severe storms in Australia
- Black nor'easter
- Severe storm events in Sydney
- Cold-core low
