= 2022 New South Wales floods =

July disaster in New South Wales

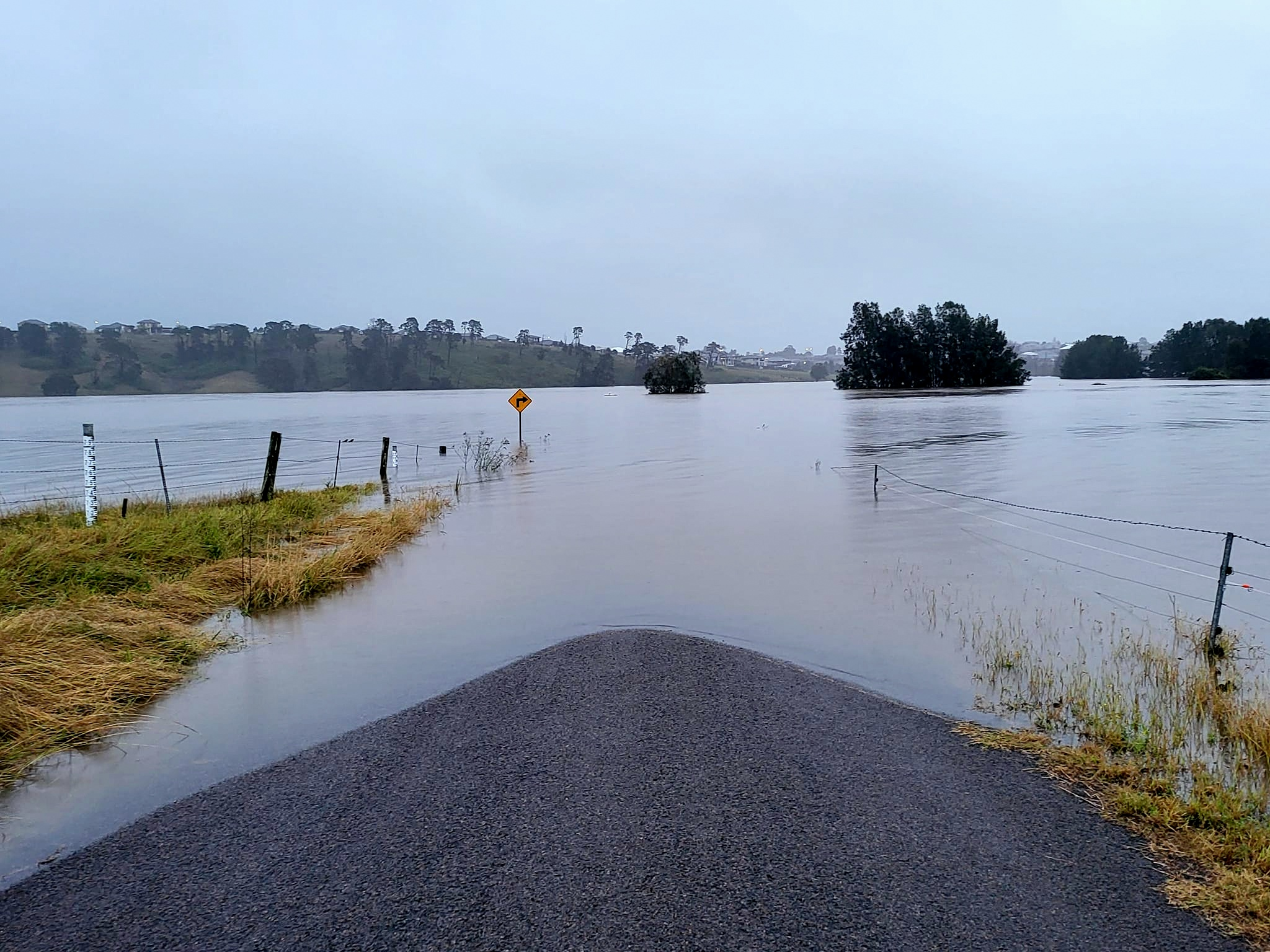
- Flooding in Hunter Valley
- Date: 3 July 2022 – 8 July 2022
- Location: Hunter Region, Central Coast, Sydney and Illawarra
- Deaths: 1
- Property damage: >$379 million (2022 USD)

Heavy flooding broke out in the Central Coast and Sydney areas of New South Wales, Australia, beginning in early July 2022. Around 85,000 people were displaced by the flooding or requested to leave their homes by authorities. The floods' damage was significant because rain fell on land that was already saturated after months of previous heavy rainfall. It was the third major flood in 2022 for some areas in the eastern seaboard.

== Impact ==
The LGAs that were declared a natural disaster were: Blacktown, Blue Mountains, Camden Council, Canterbury-Bankstown, Campbelltown, Central Coast, Cessnock, Fairfield, Georges River, Hawkesbury, Hornsby, Kiama, Lithgow, Northern Beaches, Penrith, Shellharbour, Shoalhaven, Sutherland, The Hills, Wingecarribee, Wollondilly and Wollongong, with Bayside, Dungog, Lake Macquarie, Maitland, Singleton and Upper Lachlan being later included in the list as the scope of the disaster expanded.

=== Sydney ===
On 3 July, after prolonged rainfall in the Sydney area and the wettest start to the year on record, the Hawkesbury River at Windsor peaked at 13.9 metres, the highest in decades. More than 150 evacuation orders and warnings were given in the area, in addition to over 140 rescues and 19,000 homes losing power. Warragamba dam also had a major spillage with 515 gigalitres of water flowing down its walls. Some regions, such as Lansvale and Camden in Western Sydney experienced their worst flooding disasters in four decades, with floodwaters in Windsor reaching their highest point since 1978. Around 4,000 houses and businesses in the Hawkesbury region were out of power.

Hundreds of homes were submerged in western Sydney, causing trouble for 50,000 people, with tens of thousands being displaced. New South Wales Premier Dominic Perrottet urged people to "not be complacent" in the fourth flood emergency in 16 months. A cargo ship called The Portland Bay went missing for two days straight and was on the verge of shipwreck before it was finally rescued and eventually towed to Sydney. The total damage of the storms is still unclear. At least one person, a male resident of Sydney, was killed by the floods.

On 8 July, wooden and plastic debris, in addition to leaked oil containers, a spa and refrigerators were among the rubble drifting 100 kilometres down the Hawkesbury River, which turned up on beaches in Sydney's north, disrupting ferry services.

=== Hunter Region ===
On 5 July, as the low moved north, residents of Broke, as well as 6,000 other people in the Hunter Region, were ordered to evacuate. Wollombi, Bulga and Broke were cut off and isolated by the floodwaters. The Hunter River in Singleton had peaked at 13.71m on 7 July, surpassing the flood levels of March 2022.

== Meteorology ==
Some areas of the Illawarra, near Wollongong, received more than 700 mm (27.56 in) in three days and others in Sydney received around eight months of rain in four days. Camden, in Sydney's southwest, received 197.4 mm (7.77 in) of rain between July 2 and 3, with Sydney CBD accumulating 148.6 mm (5.85 in) over the span of four days. The July flood event was the fourth major flood to strike Western Sydney in less than two years, with the weekend (July 2–3) receiving as much rainfall as Melbourne, Canberra or London generally receive in a year. The heaviest amount had fallen in Brogers Creek, where 933 mm (36.73 in) of rain fell in four days. Taree recorded its wettest day on record, registering 305 mm (12.01 in) on the gauge from the 24 hours to 9am July 7, with records dating back to 1881.

=== Cause ===
The intense rain was caused by a tropical moisture (or an atmospheric river) that arrived from northern Australia which interacted with a low pressure trough on the New South Wales coast and later became an east coast low. Global warming and the consequential ocean heating was a contributing factor to this event.

Social media, such as TikTok, saw the rise of conspiracy theories claiming that the floods were caused by "weather manipulation" and "cloud seeding" to "weaponise the weather against its own people". Conspiracy theorists shared a 2016 news story from Seven News which reported Tasmanian residents fearing that the state's worst floods in 40 years could have been linked to cloud seeding operated by Hydro Tasmania. However, these claims were quickly dismissed by experts.

== Aftermath ==
Disaster payments were made available from 6 July as the state declared natural disaster funding for 29 local government areas across Greater Sydney, the Hawkesbury, Hunter Valley, Central Coast and Illawarra. Prime minister Anthony Albanese and NSW premier Dominic Perrottet both visited flood-ravaged sites in northwest Sydney. A study in 2021 initiated by the government stated that raising the Warragamba Dam wall was the best choice for minimising risk to life, property damage and cost.

== See also ==
- 2021 eastern Australia floods
- 2022 eastern Australia floods
- 2022 south eastern Australia floods
- Severe storm events in Sydney
- 2022 Australian Rainfall Records
