= Cut-off low =

Meteorological phenomenon

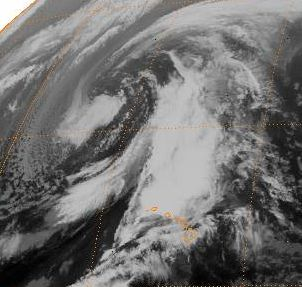
Kona Low over Hawaii, an example of a cut-off low from the main core of the jet stream.

A cut-off low (or cutoff low), sometimes referred to as the weatherman's woe, is defined by the US National Weather Service as "a closed upper-level low which has become completely displaced (cut off) from basic westerly current, and moves independently of that current." Cut-off lows form in mid-latitudes (usually between 20° and 45°) and can remain nearly stationary for days.

== Formation ==
A cut-off low is a cold-core low where wind in the upper levels of the troposphere is "cut off" from the primary westerly winds of the jet stream. They are formed when a trough in the upper-air flow pinches off and separates into a closed circulation. It is defined by concentric isotherms around the core of the low. Because they are a feature of the mid- to upper-troposphere, they may not be visible on a surface weather analysis. Because they are separated from the main westerly flow, cut-off lows can move slowly and erratically. In certain arrangements, known as a block or a blocking pattern, they can remain in place for long periods of time.

Whilst cut-off lows can form at any time of the year, they are more common in autumn, winter and spring in much of the areas affected, particularly in Australia and the Mediterranean Basin, when a mass of polar air is brought towards more southern regions (or northern, in the southern hemisphere) by the jet stream moving between 5 and 9 km altitude.

== Characteristics ==
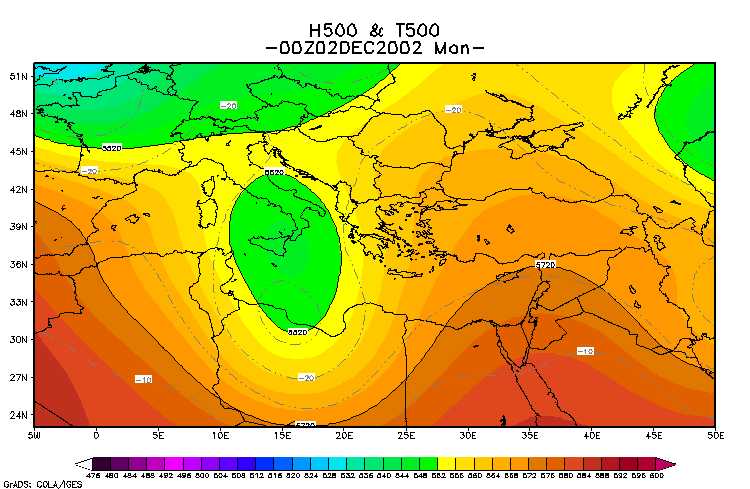
A cut-off low situated over Italy and the tip of northern Libya.

The diameter of a cut-off low can vary from a few hundred to a thousand kilometers. The air there is homogeneous and without a front line separating it from the surrounding masses, while having a decisive influence on the weather. It then most often leads to an atmospheric blocking circulation and the formation of an upper level low. High cold drops, between 1,000 and 10,000 m, are regions of low stability, while low cold drops are regions of relatively stable air. Composed of very cold air of polar origin, it typically has a horizontal extent of 300 to 1000 km and is 5,000 to 10,000 meters above sea level.

== Movement ==
A cut-off low has a slow movement, typically over a confined region, where it produces heavy rainfall. They are volatile, baroclinic systems that meander to the west with strong convergence and an ascending motion, especially when they are deepening. A cut-off low can persist from a few days to more than a week. It may be absorbed into the general circulation while another forms in the same place a few days later. The evolution and movement of a cold low, like any weather blockage, is therefore uncertain.

== Effects ==
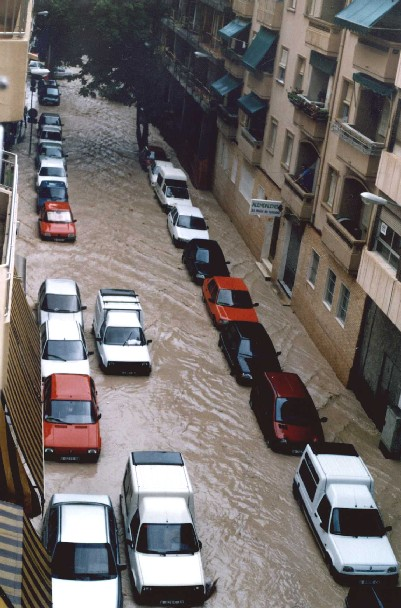
Effects of a cut-off low of September 1997 in Alicante.

Cut off lows typically create unsettled weather and, in the warm season, they may produce a lot of thunderstorms. A cut-off low has a slow movement, typically over a confined region, where it produces heavy rainfall, and can result in severe flooding. For example, a cut-off low was responsible for the July 2021 floods in Europe.

== Regional impacts ==
In southeastern Australia, cut-off lows can be associated with Australian east coast lows, which are subtropical cyclones or extratropical cyclones that originate from the east. In eastern Australia, a cut-off low can bring accumulating and widespread snowfall at low-level areas as well as elevated regions in the subtropics.

== DANA ==
In Spain, cut-off lows are often referred to as DANA (Depresión Aislada en Niveles Altos, 'Isolated Upper-Level Depression'), stressing the characteristic of upper-level lows, differentiating them from other lows, such as thermal lows originating in lower atmosphere levels during the summer months.

== See also ==
- Cold-core low
