= Climate of Sydney =

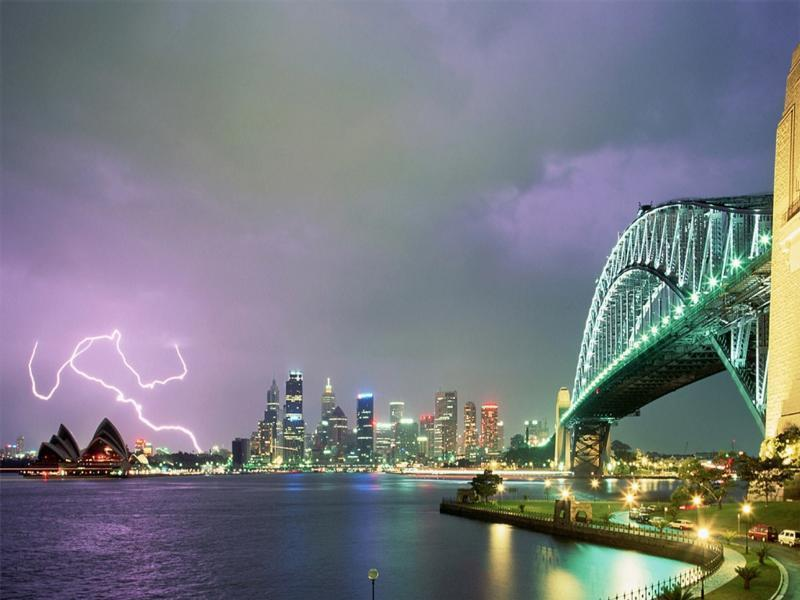
A thunderstorm in Sydney

The climate of Sydney, Australia is humid subtropical (Köppen: Cfa), shifting from mild and cool in winter to warm and occasionally hot in the summer, with no extreme seasonal differences since the weather has some maritime influence. Contrasting temperatures are recorded in the western suburbs, as Sydney CBD is more affected by the oceanic climate drivers than the hinterland (due to moderation by the Pacific Ocean).

Despite the fact that there is no distinct dry or wet season, rainfall peaks during summer and autumn months, and is at its lowest just around the middle of the year, though precipitation can be erratic throughout the year. Precipitation varies across the region, with areas adjacent to the coast being the wettest. According to the Bureau of Meteorology, Sydney falls in the temperate climate zone with warm to hot summers (Note: Sydney CBD and the Northern Suburbs are within the warm summer zone, whereas Greater Western Sydney is in the hot summer zone.) and no dry season. Under the Holdridge Life Zones classification, coastal Sydney falls in the Subtropical Moist Forest zone and the inland, western suburbs in the Subtropical Dry Forest zone. According to Troll-Paffen climate classification, Sydney has a warm-temperate subtropical climate. Sydney's plant hardiness zone ranges from zone 11a in the east to 9b in the far west, with the majority of the region falling under 10b.

Sydney has 109.5 clear days and 127.2 cloudy days annually, though it has around 200 days of visible sunshine if partly cloudy days or sunny breaks are counted. Overall, Sydney has just about 66% of possible sun for Jun-Aug and around 54% for Dec-Feb, making winter sunnier than summer on average, in addition to the city being sunny around 65% of the time in the year with its 2,640 hours of annual sunshine. On some hot summer days, southerly busters decrease temperatures by late afternoon or early evening. In late autumn to early winter, the city can be affected by east coast lows.

Sydney experiences an urban heat island effect, making certain parts of the city more vulnerable to extreme heat, particularly the west. The El Niño Southern Oscillation, the Indian Ocean Dipole and the Southern Annular Mode play an important role in determining Sydney's weather patterns: drought and bushfire on the one hand, and storms and flooding on the other. Sydney is prone to heat waves and drought, which have become more common in the 21st century. The region of Sydney, and as well as the rest of the New South Wales coastline, is warmed by the East Australian Current. In 2023, Sydney was placed at 9th place by Stars Insider for having the best weather in the world.

== Seasons ==
=== Summer ===
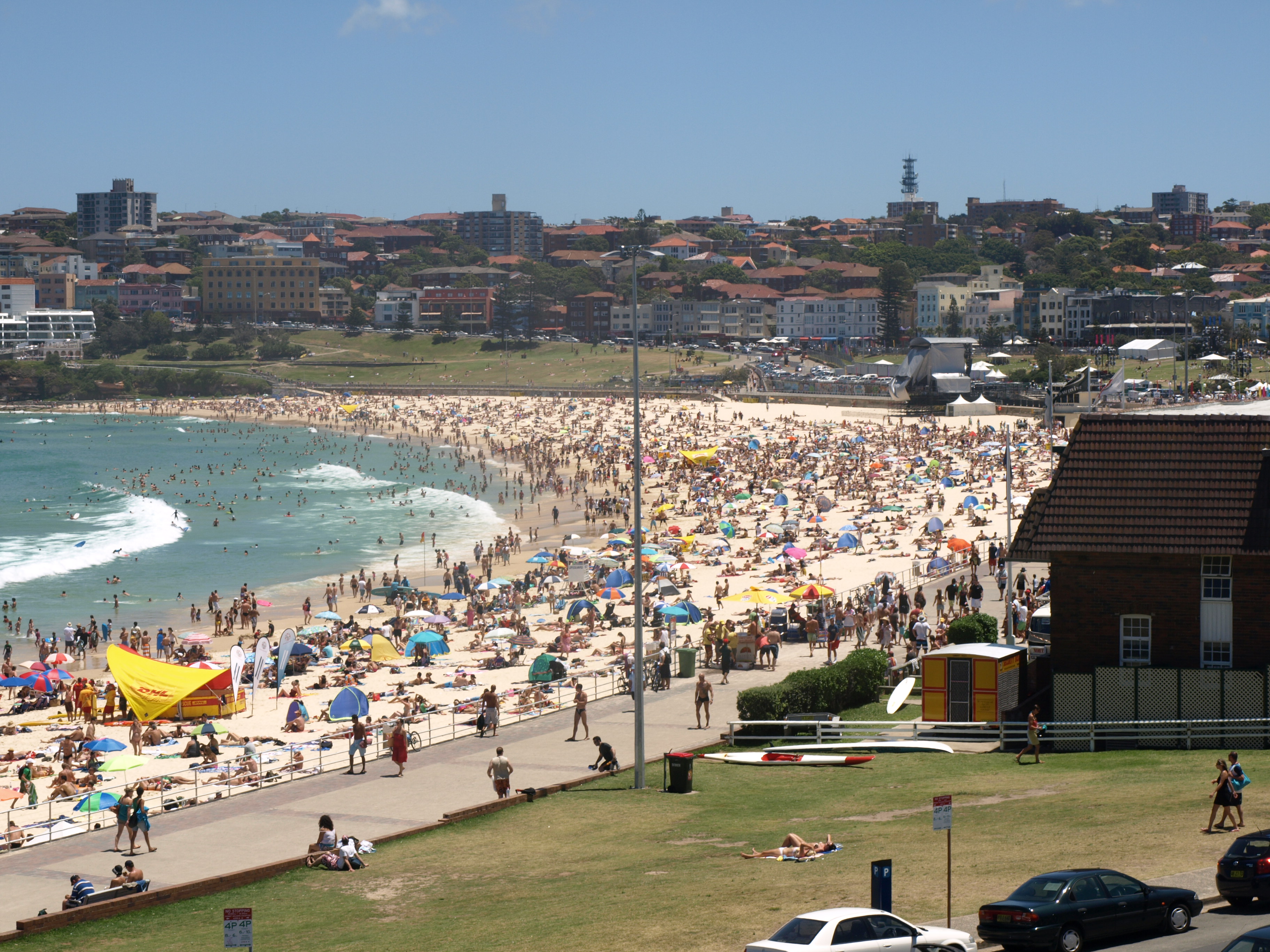
Beaches are a common visit among residents and tourists alike in summer (Bondi Beach).

Summer is generally warm to hot, and often humid (particularly in late summer). The ultraviolet index rating averages at 12, but can reach 13 in the midst of the season, which may lead to skin damage among those having light skin.

Sydney can receive hot, dry northwesterly winds from the Outback that make the temperatures soar above 40 °C (104 °F). This happens after the northwesterlies are carried entirely over the continental landmass, not picking up additional moisture from a body of water and retaining most of their heat. On these occasions, the city can experience the fury of the desert climate, although they are often ended with a southerly buster, which is a windy, shallow cold front or a sea breeze that sweeps up from the southeast abruptly cooling the temperature. At times, it may be accompanied by a thunderstorm and drizzle, and it may keep the temperatures cool the following few days as well.

In the Sydney central business district, an average of 15 days a year have temperatures of more than 30 °C (86 °F) and 3 days with temperatures over 35 °C (95 °F). In contrast, western suburbs such as Liverpool and Penrith have 41 and 67 days with temperatures above 30 °C (86 °F), 10 and 19 days above 35 °C (95 °F), and, 1 and 4 days above 40 °C (104 °F), respectively.

The highest recorded maximum temperature at Sydney Airport was 46.4 °C (115.5 °F), which was on 18 January 2013. The highest recorded maximum temperature at Sydney CBD was recorded on that same day with the temperature climaxing at 45.8 °C (114.4 °F). The highest recorded maximum temperature within Sydney's Metropolitan area was recorded at Penrith with a high of 48.9 °C (120 °F), a Western Sydney suburb, on 4 January 2020. At that time, Penrith was the hottest place on the planet and the hottest temperature recorded within Australia and the Southern Hemisphere for all of 2020. A record high dew point was set on 11 January 2024 with a dew point of 26.7 °C (80.1 °F).

=== Autumn ===
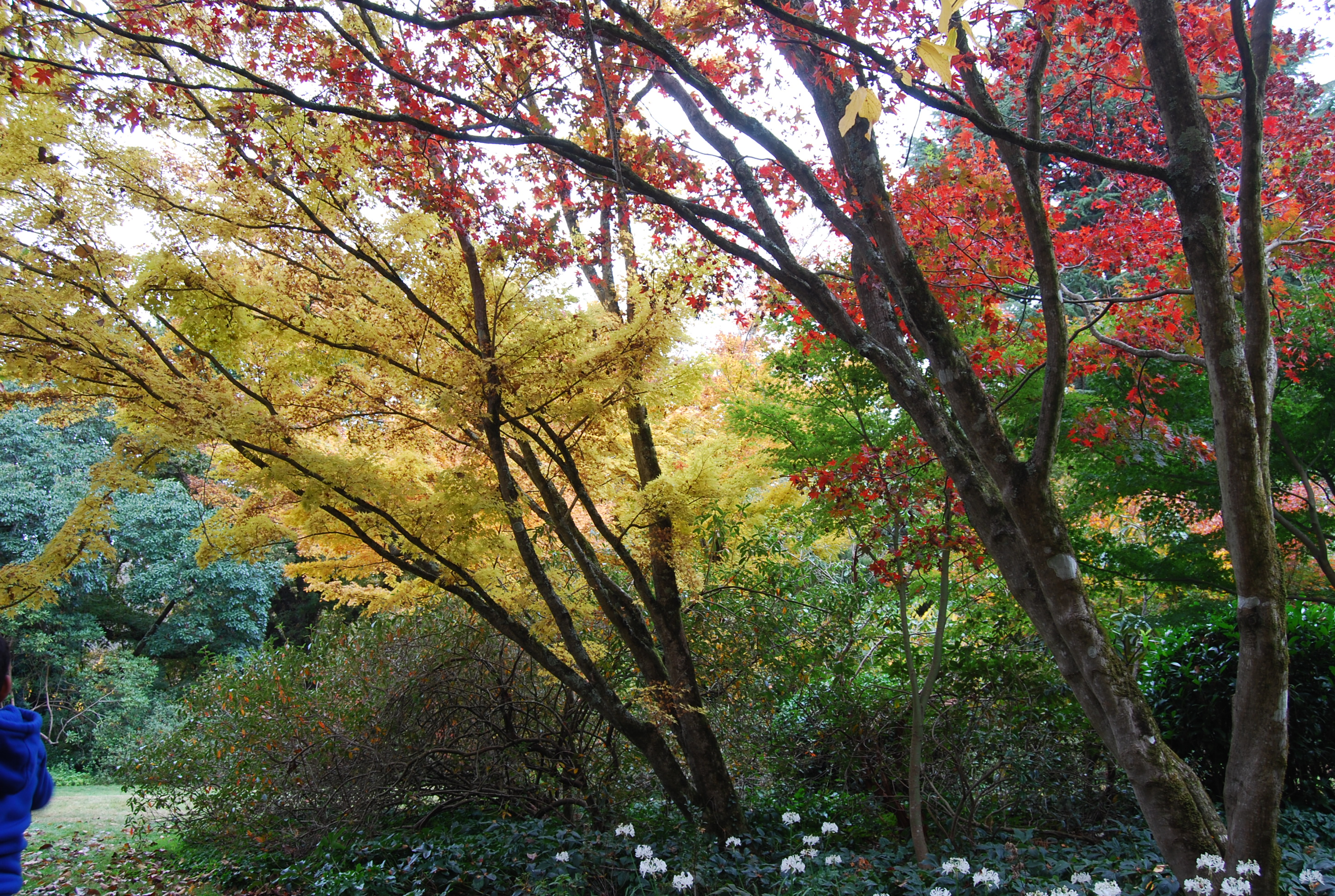
Autumn foliage in a Sydney suburb

Late summer conditions usually continue until the last week of March. Most heavy rainfall events usually occur in late summer and early autumn as the subtropical ridge of high pressure, which rotates counterclockwise, is to the south of Australia and therefore give way for moist easterlies from the Tasman Sea and as well as low pressure systems to penetrate the region. In the early 19th century, March was considered the wet season by explorer William Wentworth, as it was more prone to flooding than other months.

The transition from late summer to autumn is gradual, with noticeably cooler and crisper conditions taking in effect by around mid-April. Temperatures in autumn are usually consistent and stable, lacking any extremes that tend to be experienced in spring and summer. Sydney's northern suburbs generally experience slightly cooler temperatures than the coastal suburbs, creating favourable conditions for deciduous trees. During autumn, suburbs such as Pymble and Turramurra are known for their colourful displays, particularly those of sweet gum trees.

The lowest maximum temperature in autumn is 11.3 °C (52.3 °F), recorded on 24 May 1904. The highest maximum autumn temperature ever recorded at Sydney Airport was recorded on 9 March 1983, with the temperature peaking at 41.2 °C (106.2 °F). Though the hottest autumn day ever recorded in Sydney's metropolitan area was on 6 March 1938 when Richmond RAAF hit 41.9 °C (107.4 °F).

=== Winter ===
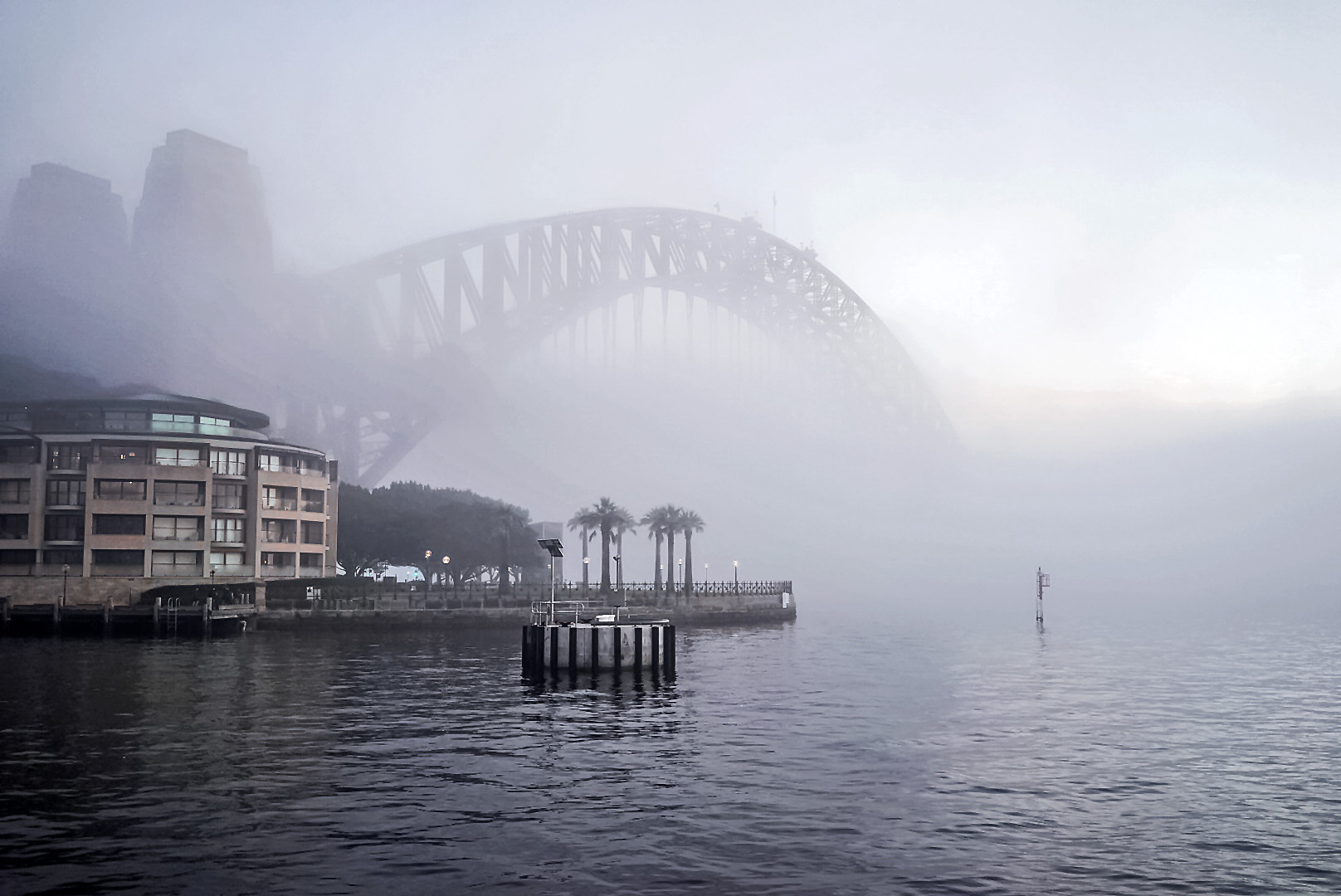
A foggy winter morning on Sydney Harbour

Winter in central Sydney tends to be mild where the lows rarely drop below 7 °C (45 °F), mainly due to proximity to the ocean. Furthermore, Sydney CBD (Observatory Hill) has never recorded frost. In the far west (in places such as Richmond and Camden), the diurnal range can be relatively great, particularly in late winter. In the west, Liverpool and Richmond have 4 and 38 nights, respectively, where temperatures dip below 2 °C (36 °F). On average, only 1 night in Liverpool and 17 nights in Richmond have lows that go below 0 °C (32 °F). In such cold mornings, frost can form in the far western suburbs. The lowest maximum temperature in Liverpool was 8.2 °C (47 °F), recorded on 28 July 1981.

Sydney receives around 15 days of fog annually, which occurs in winter mornings; some can be thick enough to divert planes and cancel ferry services. During late winter, warm dry westerly winds which dominate may raise the maximum temperatures as high as 25 °C (77 °F) in some instances. As the subtropical ridge is north of Sydney in mid-to-late winter, it picks up dry westerlies from the continent's interior because of its anticlockwise rotation, thus producing more sunny days in the region.

The lowest recorded minimum at Observatory Hill was 2.1 °C (35.8 °F) on 22 June 1932, while the coldest in the Sydney metropolitan area was −8 °C (18 °F), in Richmond. The lowest recorded maximum temperature at Observatory Hill was 7.7 °C (45.9 °F). Although not usually considered a suburb of Sydney, Picton, a town in the Macarthur Region of Sydney (approximately 81 km from central Sydney), recorded a low of −10.0 °C (14.0 °F) on 16 July 1970. Sydney's warmest winter day was recorded on 30 August 2024 at Sydney Airport when the temperature hit 31.6 °C (88.9 °F) at 2:48 PM.

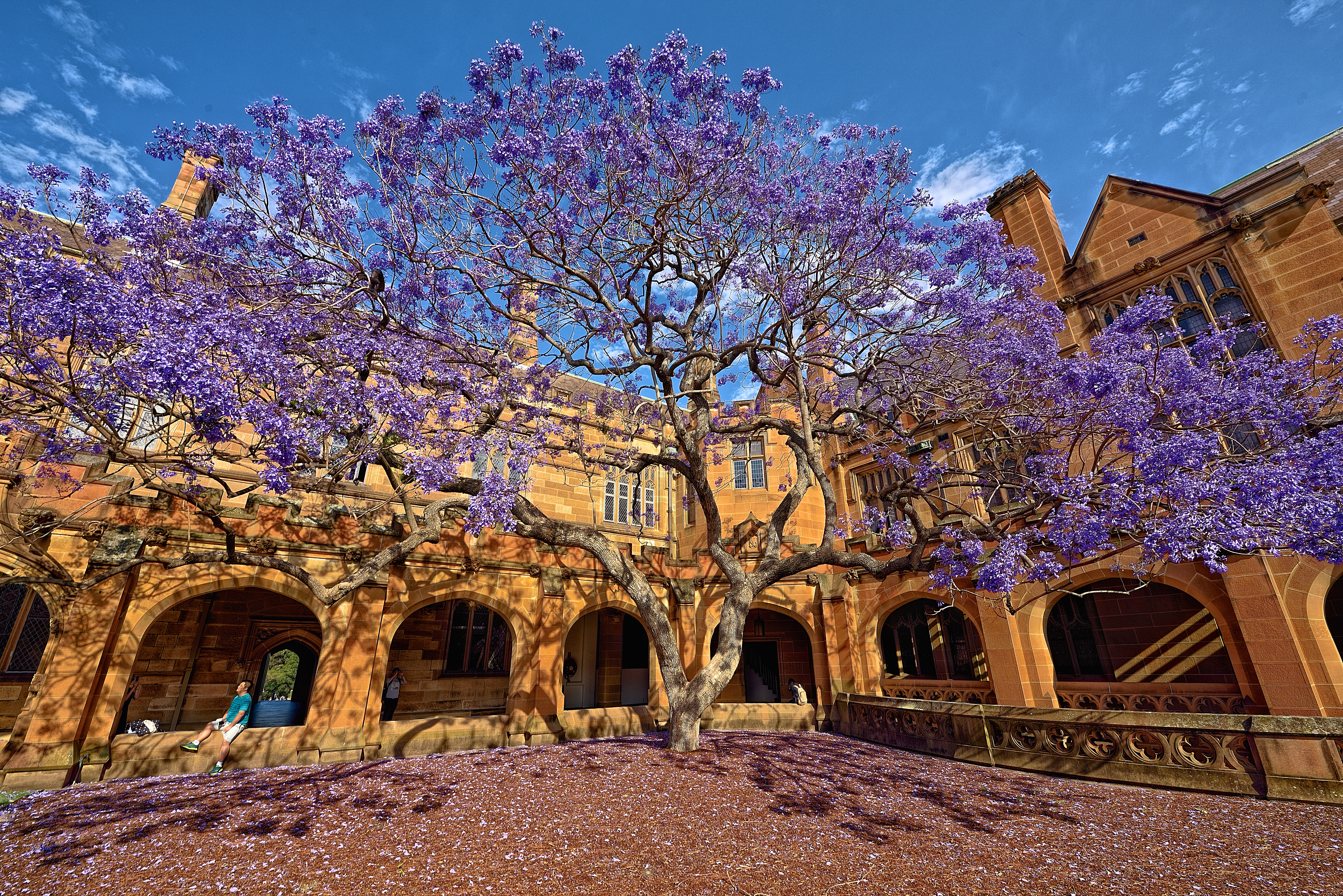
Spring blooms of jacaranda trees attract visitors.

=== Spring ===
Early spring is rapidly transitional and erratic. Cool conditions from late winter may continue in September, but due to the drastic transition, temperatures above 30 °C (86 °F) can also be expected in that month, including the odd thunderstorm. By November, summery conditions begin, albeit with relatively low humidity. Because the subtropical ridge lies to the north of Sydney this time of the year, it will bring westerly winds from the interior that produce mostly sunny conditions, with relatively low dewpoints. Extreme, changeable and inconsistent temperatures are much more prevalent in spring than other seasons. Furthermore, the diurnal range is higher in this season than it is in autumn.

The lowest maximum temperature in spring was 9.5 °C (49.1 °F), recorded on 8 September 1869. 9am relative humidity is the lowest in the year during spring, ranging from 58% to 68%, with early spring receiving lower figures. The highest maximum Spring temperature ever recorded at Sydney Airport was on 25 November 1982, when the temperature eclipsed at 43.4 °C (110.1 °F). Sydney CBD also recorded its hottest spring day on this same day, peaking at 41.8 °C (107.2 °F). The highest spring temperature recorded in Sydney's Metropolitan area was registered at Richmond on 23 November 2014, peaking at 45.3 °C (113.5 °F).

== Climatic trends and extremes ==
=== Early climate history ===
Palaeoclimatic evidence indicates that the climate of the Sydney region has changed considerably over geological time. During the Permian, the region experienced freezing to cold high-latitude conditions and periods of glacial influence, followed by substantial warming around the Permian–Triassic transition. During the Cenozoic, south-eastern Australia experienced periods of considerably warmer and wetter climate than at present, followed by a long-term trend towards cooler and drier conditions.

During the Quaternary, Sydney experienced substantial variations in temperature and precipitation associated with glacial–interglacial cycles and changes in regional atmospheric circulation. The early Holocene was generally drier than the later Holocene, while the last several thousand years have been characterised by considerable hydroclimatic variability. The Dharawal people traditionally recognise six seasons in the region based on recurring climatic and ecological conditions. Written observations of Sydney's climate began following European settlement in 1788, with Watkin Tench and later William Wentworth providing early descriptions of temperature, frost, rainfall, thunderstorms, winds and seasonal variations.

=== 1980s–2000s ===
In 1985, the first 11 days of July in Sydney all recorded maximum temperatures below 17 °C (62.6 °F). In 1989, Sydney last experienced a start to June in which the first seven days remained below 18.5 °C (65.3 °F) at Observatory Hill. Such cold starts to winter had been more common prior to 1989. The summer of 1990 to 1991 was Sydney's second-warmest on record until it was surpassed by 2016 to 2017. At Observatory Hill, it remained the benchmark for mean maximum, minimum and mean temperatures for more than 25 years, while also recording the greatest number of nights above 20 °C (68 °F) until those records were broken in the mid 2010's. In 1998, Australia recorded its warmest year since national records began in 1910, with a mean temperature of 22.54 °C (72.6 °F), 0.73 °C (1.3 °F) above the 1961 to 1990 average. The record was driven primarily by exceptionally high overnight minimum temperatures, particularly across northern Australia, and was associated with above-average sea surface temperatures surrounding the continent following the 1997–98 El Niño and the subsequent transition to a weak La Niña. The Bureau of Meteorology noted that the national record was consistent with the broader trend of global warming observed during the 20th century. Since the early 1990s, Western Sydney has experienced more intense summer heatwaves than coastal Sydney, with maximum temperatures exceeding those of coastal Sydney by up to 10 °C (18 °F).

The Bureau of Meteorology reported in 2011 that 2002 to 2005 had been the warmest years in Sydney since records began in 1859. The year 2004 saw an average daily maximum temperature of 23.4 °C (74.1 °F), 2005 of 23.4 °C (74.1 °F), 2002 of 22.9 °C (73.2 °F), and 2003 of 22.7 °C (72.9 °F). The average daily maximum between 1859 and 2004 was 21.6 °C (70.9 °F). Seven (of the ten) warmest years in 151 years of recordkeeping have occurred in the ten years between 2001 and 2010, with this decade being the warmest on record for minimum temperatures. In 2005, Sydney recorded its equal-warmest year since observations began at Observatory Hill in 1859, matching the record set in 2004. The annual mean temperature was 19.1 °C (66.4 °F), 1 °C (1.8 °F) above the historical average, while eight of the ten warmest years on record at the time had occurred since 1988. The annual mean temperature record was later broken in the 2010s.

Sydney Harbour Bridge during the 2009 Australian dust storm

June 2006 was Sydney's coldest June in more than two decades, with a mean maximum temperature of 16.5 °C (61.7 °F), 2.2 °C (4.0 °F) below average and the lowest since 1984. Frequent cold fronts and below-average sunshine contributed to the unusually cool conditions. The Bureau of Meteorology reported that the summer of 2007–08 was the coolest in 11 years, the wettest in six years, the cloudiest in 16 years, and one of only three summers in recorded history to lack a maximum temperature above 31 °C (88 °F). However, in 2007, Sydney recorded its highest annual mean minimum temperature in 149 years of observations. August 2008 was Sydney's coldest August in 64 years, with a mean maximum temperature of 16.6 °C (61.9 °F), the lowest for the month since 1944. Sydney experienced its coldest October in 17 years in 2009, with a mean maximum temperature of 21.5 °C (70.7 °F), around 2.4 °C (4.3 °F) below average. However, 2009 was characterised by well-above-average minimum temperatures, which were the second highest on record. The year also marked Sydney's 17th consecutive year with above-average annual maximum temperatures.

=== 2010s ===
Sydney recorded its coldest September in five years in 2010, with a mean maximum temperature of 19.3 °C (66.7 °F), around 2 °C (3.6 °F) below the long-term average. Notwithstanding, 2010 was the equal fourth warmest year on record for Sydney, with an average maximum of 22.6 °C (72.7 °F), which was 0.6 °C (1.1 °F) above the historical annual average. In December 2011, Sydney experienced its coldest start to summer since 1960, with eight consecutive days failing to reach 23 °C (73.4 °F). The city's mean maximum temperature that month was 22.2 °C (72.0 °F), just below the record-low December average maximum of 22.5 °C (72.5 °F), recorded in 1924. In July 2012, the first six days of the month failed to reach 17 °C (62.6 °F) in Sydney CBD, the first such occurrence since 1997. September 2013 was Sydney's warmest September on record, with mean temperature records broken at all six major temperature stations across the city. At Observatory Hill, the mean maximum temperature reached 24.4 °C (75.9 °F), 4.4 °C (7.9 °F) above the historical average and 1.1 °C (2.0 °F) above the previous September record. The month also set records for lack of cool nights, with no minimum temperatures below 10 °C (50 °F) recorded at Observatory Hill for the first time in September. In 2013, Sydney recorded what was then its warmest year on record by both mean and maximum temperatures, accompanied by a record lack of cool days and nights.

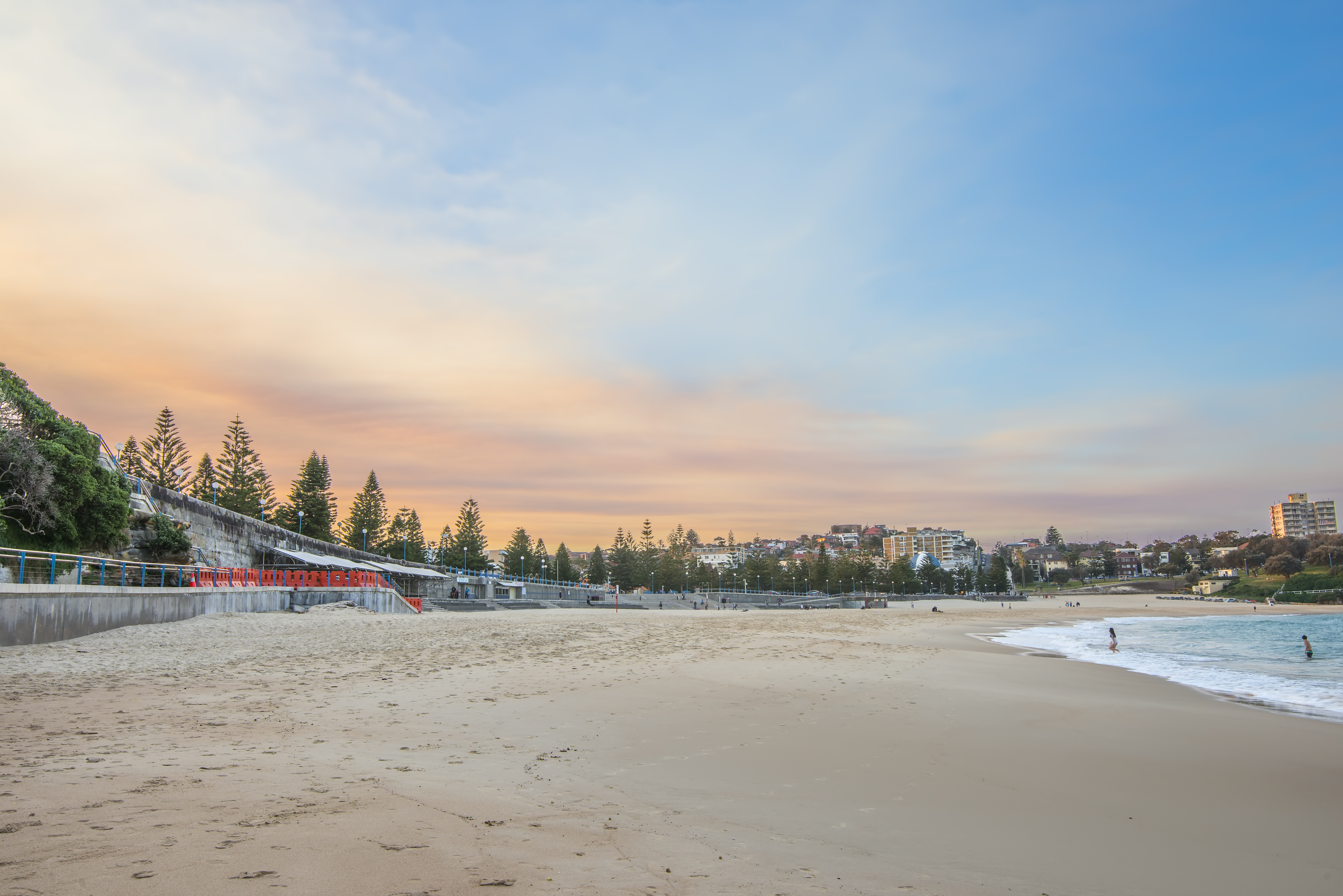
A warm August day at Coogee Beach in 2014, an unusually warm year, with the mild winter weather attracting beachgoers.

The following year, 2014 became Sydney's second-warmest year on record at the time, behind 2013. Annual mean and maximum temperatures were the second highest on record, while the annual mean minimum temperature equalled the record set in 2007 and 2009. Climate models in 2014 suggested that sea temperatures off Sydney are decades away from becoming "tropical". A scenario of increasing CO_{2} emissions proposed winter sea surface temperatures will consistently exceed 18 °C (64 °F) between 2020 and 2030, and summer sea surface temperatures will consistently surpass 25 °C (77 °F) between 2040 and 2060. In July 2015, Sydney experienced its longest cold spell in 26 years, recording 11 consecutive nights with minimum temperatures below 8 °C (46.4 °F), the longest such run since 1989. The month was also Sydney's coolest July since 2002 by both mean and minimum temperature. In February 2016, Sydney recorded its longest stretch of warm days on record, with maximum temperatures reaching at least 26 °C (79 °F) on 25 consecutive days between 5 and 29 February. In 2016, Sydney recorded a mean temperature of 19.6 °C (67.3 °F), making it the city's warmest year on record, a record that remained unbroken as of 2026. Several weather stations, including Observatory Hill, also recorded their highest annual mean maximum and minimum temperatures.

The summer of 2016–17 was Sydney's hottest on record. The city experienced 11 days with maximum temperatures of at least 35 °C (95 °F), while western Sydney recorded a record number of days above 40 °C (104 °F). Sydney also experienced 58 nights with minimum temperatures above 20 °C (68 °F), and no summer nights fell below 15 °C (59 °F). Furthermore, January 2017 was Sydney's hottest month on record. The mean maximum temperature at Observatory Hill was 29.6 °C (85.3 °F), surpassing the previous monthly record of 29.5 °C (85.1 °F) set in January 1896. During the month, Sydney recorded 11 days with maximum temperatures above 30 °C (86 °F) and five days above 35 °C (95 °F), both the highest totals for any month since records began in 1858. July 2017 to June 2018 in southeastern Australia proved to be the hottest financial year on record with maximum temperatures being the warmest on record and minimums above average. Sydney's 2017 mean temperature of 19.5 °C (67.1 °F) degrees was 1.7 °C (3.1 °F) degrees above the long term average and the second highest value in 158 years of records. April 2018 was Sydney's warmest April on record. At Observatory Hill, the mean maximum temperature reached 26.1 °C (79.0 °F), surpassing the previous April record set in 1922 and exceeding the site's average January maximum temperature. July 2018 was Sydney's warmest July on record at the time, with a mean maximum temperature of 19.9 °C (67.8 °F), 3.5 °C (6.3 °F) above the long-term average. Sydney Airport also recorded 16 days above 20 °C (68 °F), the highest number of such days recorded in July. In 2019, many sites across Greater Sydney recorded their highest annual mean maximum temperatures on record, with the previous records at several locations having been set only the year before, in 2018.

=== 2020s–present ===
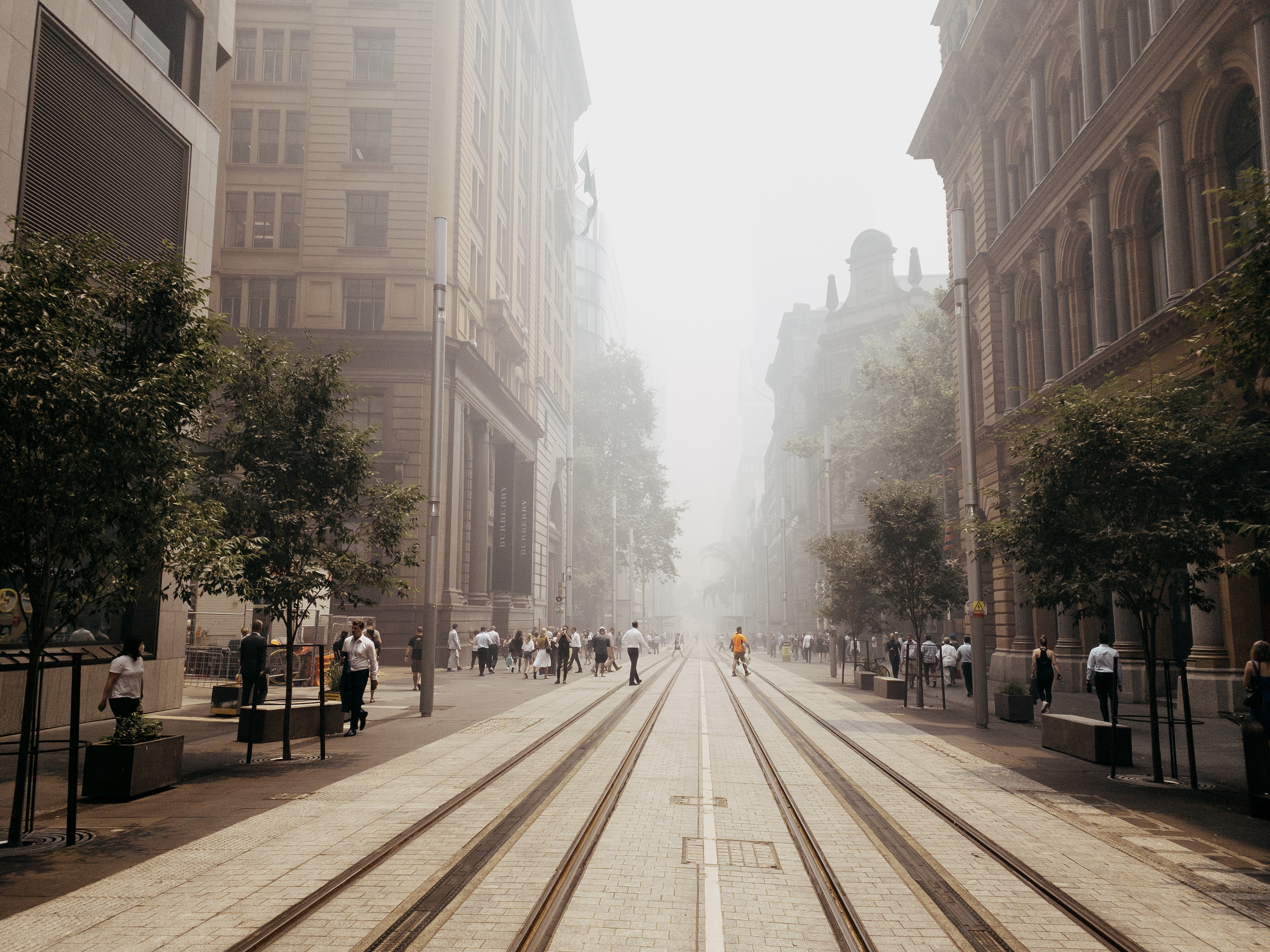
Bushfire smoke on George Street, Sydney, during the 2019–20 Australian bushfire season.

In 2020, researchers at The Australia Institute discovered that Sydney was experiencing longer summers and shorter winters in recent decades, compared to those in the 1950s and 1960s. During heat research commissioned by Penrith City Council, temperature loggers installed at 120 locations across the City of Penrith recorded temperatures of up to 52 °C (125.6 °F) at Berkshire Park, 51.5 °C (124.7 °F) at Agnes Banks, and 50.1 °C (122.2 °F) at Badgerys Creek on 4 January 2020. Temperatures exceeded 50 °C (122.0 °F) on several occasions during the 2019–20 summer, including 50.1 °C (122.2 °F) at Berkshire Park on 31 December 2019, and 51.5 °C (124.7 °F) at Badgerys Creek and 51.3 °C (124.3 °F) at Berkshire Park on 1 February 2020. Despite the exceptionally hot start to the decade, the 2020–21 summer was Sydney's coolest in a decade due to the influence of La Niña. In May 2021, Sydney experienced its coldest May in decades, with Observatory Hill recording its lowest average minimum temperature for the month since 1957.

In June 2022, Sydney experienced its coldest start to winter in more than 30 years. The first seven days of the month all recorded maximum temperatures below 18.5 °C (65.3 °F) at Observatory Hill, the first occurrence since 1989. Sydney CBD experienced its longest period without a 30 °C (86 °F) day since the 1880s before Observatory Hill reached 30 °C (86 °F) on 18 January 2023. July 2023 was Sydney's warmest July on record. The city's average maximum temperature exceeded the previous July record of 19.89 °C (67.8 °F), set in 2018, after a prolonged period of unseasonably warm winter weather. In December 2023, Sydney experienced its hottest start to summer on record. During the first fortnight of the season, Observatory Hill recorded a mean maximum temperature of 29.5 °C (85.1 °F), surpassing the previous record set in 1976. The summer of 2023 to 2024 was Sydney's third warmest on record, with a mean temperature of approximately 24.1 °C (75.4 °F) at Observatory Hill, more than 2 °C (3.6 °F) above the long-term average.

Since the early 2020s, Sydney's summers have become more humid due to global warming, which has resulted in sea surface temperatures being 1–3 °C (2–5 °F) above average. March 2024 was Sydney's warmest March in more than a century. During the first half of the month, Observatory Hill recorded nine consecutive days with maximum temperatures above 28 °C (82 °F), producing the hottest start to March since 1915. The prolonged warmth contributed to a mean maximum temperature of 27.4 °C (81.3 °F) for the month, which was well above average. In August 2024, Greater Sydney experienced unusually warm conditions, with several weather stations recording their warmest August on record by mean temperature. In 2024, several weather stations across Greater Sydney, including sites in western Sydney, recorded their highest annual mean minimum temperatures on record. Several sites also recorded their highest annual mean temperatures on record. Sydney recorded its second-warmest September on record in 2025, with a mean maximum temperature of 23.5 °C (74.3 °F), surpassed only by September 2013. In October 2025, Sydney recorded its warmest October on record based on mean maximum temperature, with an average maximum of 26.6 °C (79.9 °F), surpassing the previous October record of 26.2 °C (79.2 °F) set in 1988. The spring of 2025 was Sydney's hottest on record. The city's mean temperature exceeded 20 °C (68.0 °F) for the first time since observations began at Observatory Hill in 1858, while the mean maximum temperature reached 25.5 °C (77.9 °F), only 0.2 °C (0.4 °F) below the city's summer average. Sydney also recorded 12 days with maximum temperatures above 30 °C (86 °F), around three times the seasonal average. In 2025, Sydney Airport equalled its highest annual mean minimum temperature on record, while several sites across Greater Sydney equalled their highest annual mean temperatures on record.

May 2026 was Sydney's second-warmest May on record. Overnight minimum temperatures averaged 14.5 °C (58.1 °F) at Observatory Hill, around 3 °C (5.4 °F) above the long-term average and the highest May minimum temperature on record. The unusually warm nights contributed to one of the mildest Mays observed in the city since records began in 1859. On 19 June 2026, the Observatory Hill weather station recorded its 13th consecutive day with a maximum temperature exceeding 20 °C (68 °F), breaking the previous June record of nine consecutive days set in 1919. By the end of the month, Sydney had recorded 18 days above 20 °C (68 °F), equalling the June record established in 1957. June ultimately became Sydney's warmest on record by mean maximum temperature. The winter of 2026 was the warmest on record in Sydney, following temperatures from June to early August that averaged 2.3 °C (4.1 °F) above the long-term average and an unusually low number of cold nights. The season had a mean temperature of approximately 15.29 °C (59.5 °F), surpassing the previous record of 14.95 °C (58.9 °F) set in 2013, while its average maximum temperature of approximately 19.64 °C (67.4 °F) was also a winter record.

== Microclimate ==
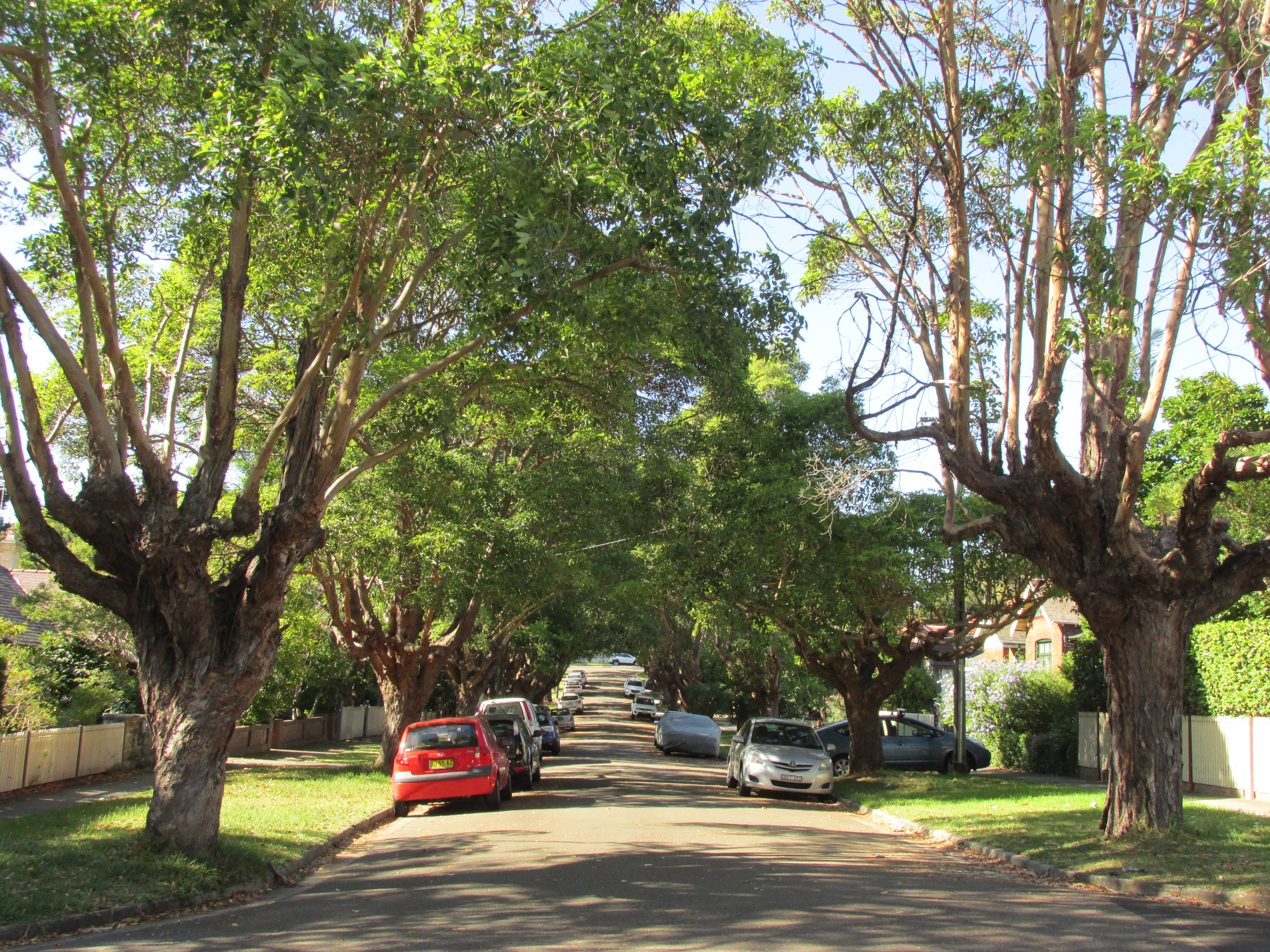
Streets with tree canopy, which are usually found in the inner West and northern Sydney, tend to have lower air temperatures (Summer Hill).

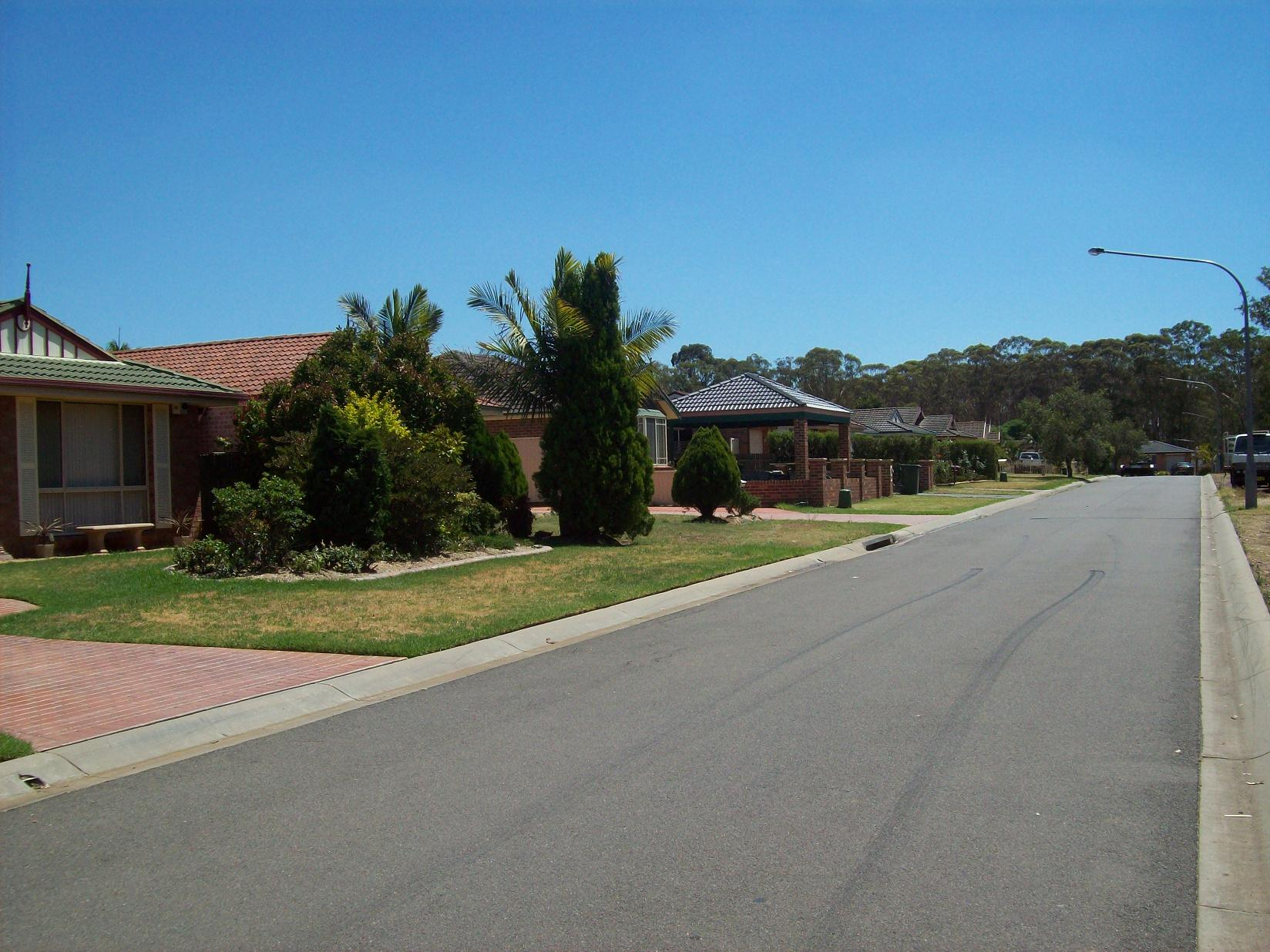
Streets with lower tree cover, usually found in recent suburbs in the west, experience hotter temperatures due to heat radiation (Plumpton).

The region of Sydney is subject to phenomena typical of a microclimate, namely in late spring and summer, where the western suburbs are hotter than the Sydney CBD by 6–10 °C (11–18 °F) due to urban sprawl exacerbating the urban heat island effect and less exposure to mitigating sea breezes which cool down Sydney's eastern edge and fail to move 9 km (5.6 mi) inland. The dramatic temperature difference between coastal and inland areas is caused by a combination of desert-warmed air from central Australia reaching the west, and as well as density of housing, lack of vegetation or open spaces, and the Blue Mountains which help trap the hot air.

When it is 25 °C (77 °F) at Bondi for instance, the temperature will be around 30 °C (86 °F) just west of the Sydney Harbour Bridge, around 35 °C (95 °F) near Parramatta and as much as 40 °C (104 °F) 40 km (25 mi) inland. Such extreme temperature differences in the Sydney metropolitan area usually occur in late spring when the western Pacific Ocean is still quite cool and the inland air is warm. Furthermore, within the CBD, heat maps show the area around Central Station (in Haymarket) is 0.5–1.0 °C (1–2 °F) warmer than Circular Quay and surrounds, making it the hottest place in the CBD.

According to ecologist Sebastian Pfautsch from the University of Freiburg, in Sydney's hot days there could be discrepancies of up to 22 more days above 40 °C (104 °F) recorded in urban space compared to a weather station from the Bureau of Meteorology. Because 48.9 °C (120.0 °F) was recorded in Penrith (on 4 January 2020), it will not be unusual to have a 50 °C (122 °F) reading somewhere nearby, especially if it lacked green space and retained heat to intensify heatwave temperatures. Richmond has the second largest overall temperature range recorded in Australia, after Mitchell, Queensland; −8.3 to 47.8 °C (17.1 to 118.0 °F).

=== Urban heat island ===
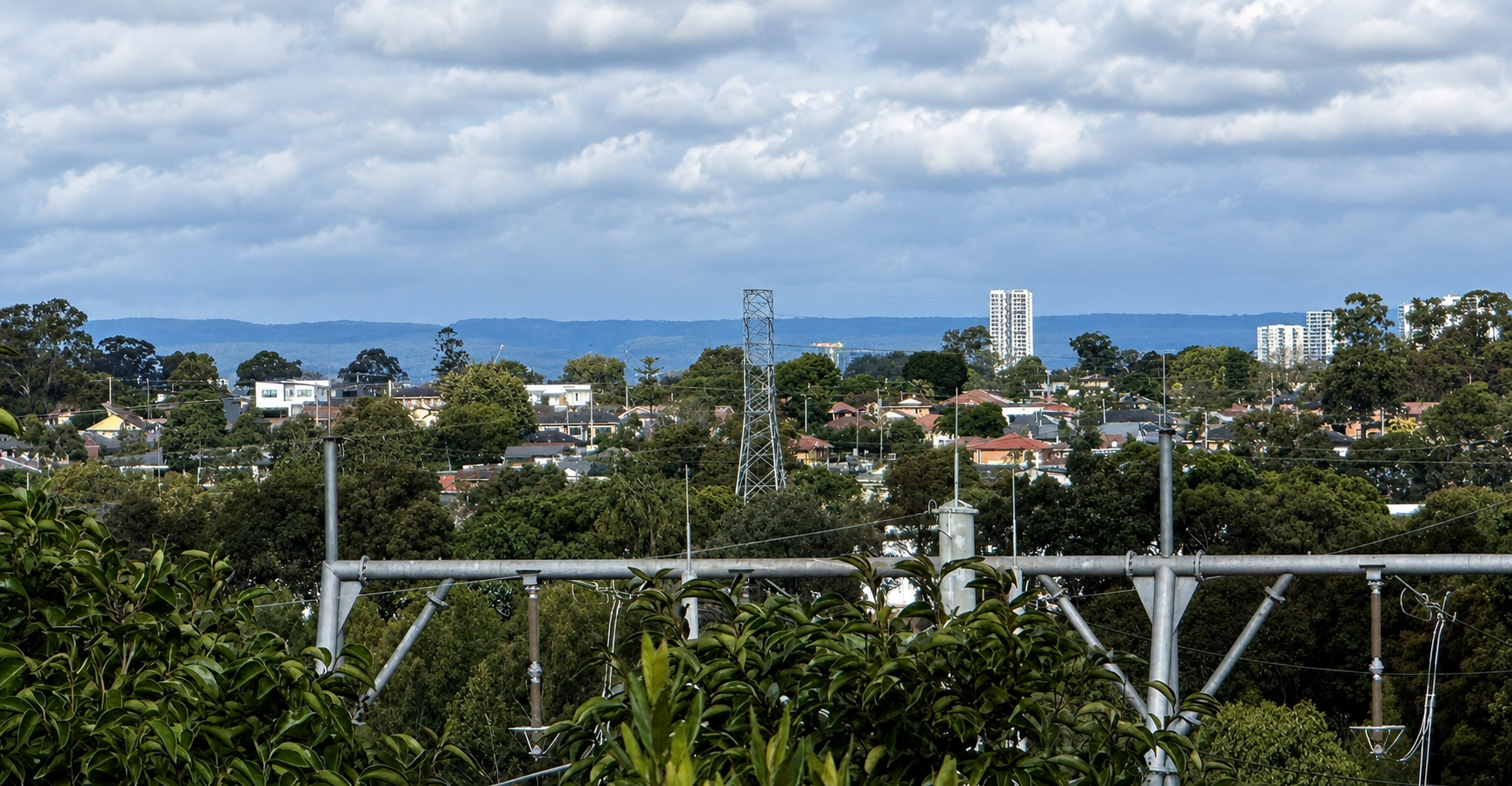
Smithfield demonstrates the substantial tree canopy found in parts of western Sydney, particularly within residential areas, public reserves and bushland corridors.

A study by the University of Western Australia and RMIT indicated that the western suburbs have a much stronger urban heat island effect than those east of the CBD and that hotter temperatures in the west are human contributed due to solar radiation absorbing materials in black asphalt and dark roofs, anthropogenic heat from cars and less natural environments, thereby creating a "heat dome" that blocks the cooler air from the sea. Greening Australia stated that January mean maximum temperatures in the west have risen at a pace of 0.65 °C per decade, over twice as much as eastern Sydney's 0.28 °C per decade. The OEH warned that further development could cause more exceedingly hot days in the west by 2030.

Urban heat island of the CBD has been efficaciously blocking the cooler air from reaching the inland suburbs because the CBD's "high temperature, is like a wall that stops the sea breeze in its tracks. Over Sydney's CBD is a heat dome because of the high density of concrete and asphalt. If we want to cool western Sydney and demolish this wall, we need to cool the CBD first", Professor Mattheos Santamouris from UNSW states. He explained that cooling the CBD would reduce the temperature by 1.5 °C in the west and tree coverage could cool down suburban streets by as much as 10 °C (18 °F) in hot days since high-density housing developments and scarce trees trap heat. Efforts have been introduced to investigate and mitigate this heat effect, including increasing shade from tree canopies, adding rooftop gardens to high rise structures and changing pavement colour. Waterbodies and open spaces also provide cooling benefits in urban areas.

According to climate researchers, relatively easy modifications such as constructing fountains and water playgrounds could also lower temperatures in the western suburbs. The city now has 3.6% more trees in 2016 than it did in 2009 and Penrith City Council had planned to plant 100,000 trees from August 2018, in addition to planning a large city park, creating a water-sensitive urban design, street shading, and the use of cool materials in its building developments. Furthermore, Parramatta City Council has installed 20 temperature sensors among different tree species in its suburbs to compare how different species can help reduce urban heat.

== Precipitation ==
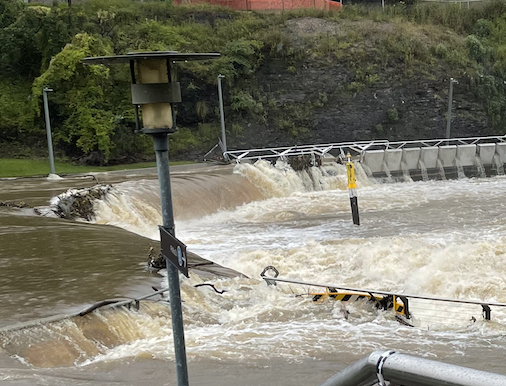
Parramatta ferry wharf bridge flooded during the 2021 Eastern Australian floods

Rainfall is slightly higher or dominant during the first half of the year, particularly in late summer and early autumn, when the ocean has peaked its warmth. Rainfall will tend to be lower in the second half of the year when the subtropical ridge is just to the north of the city. Most rain comes mostly from major storms, rarely drizzle, particularly from subtropical lows that bring warm, moist air onshore.

Due to the unpredictability of rain, the wettest and driest months change on a yearly basis. Rain falls on 40% of days, anytime of the year, but usually in January to June. Coastal showers, which are a mix of convective and stratiform, occur in post-frontal south-east flow, where they become volatile over the warm ocean near Sydney, thereby setting up an "ocean-effect" (where rainfall is intensified leeward of a waterbody).

Frontal lows frequently affect Sydney in winter, but they are generally dry because such lows remain farther south, and the cold front's passage is connected with a shift from warm and dry northwesterly winds to colder, damp south-westerlies, which lose much of their moisture over the Great Dividing Range. Therefore, the drier winters are due to its rain shadow position on the leeward (eastern) side of the Great Dividing Range, which shield the region from south-westerly cold fronts that arrive from the Southern Ocean.

Within the city and surrounds, rainfall varies, from around 730 mm (28.74 in) at Badgerys Creek (in the west) to 1,400 mm (55.12 in) at Turramurra (the northeast) in the Northern Suburbs, which create an orographic rainfall. The annual evaporation rate for Sydney is 1,600 mm (62.99 in), with the rate in the summer being 600 mm (23.62 in) and in winter 300 mm (11.81 in).

=== Storms ===
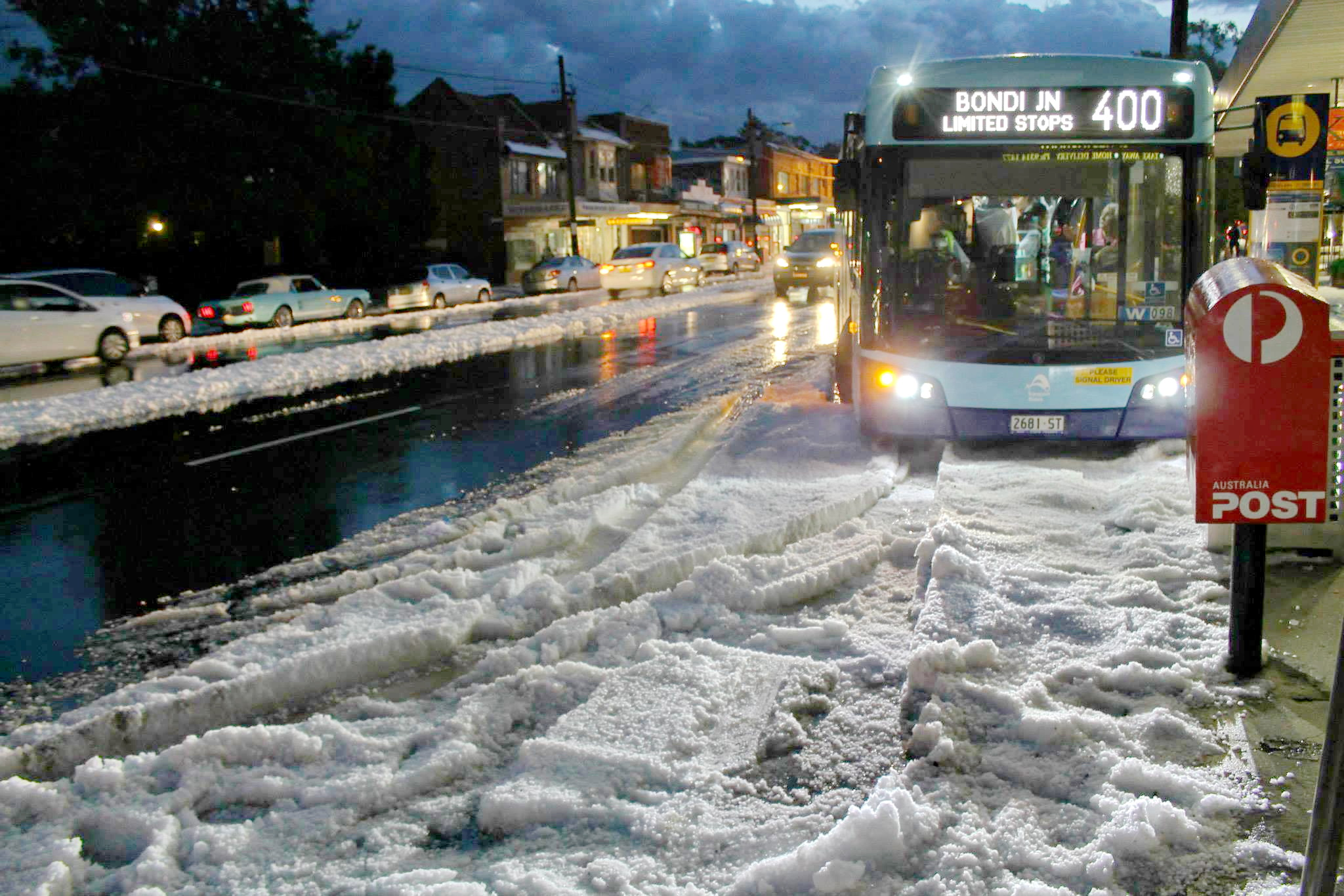
Heavy hailstorm in Pagewood, April 2015

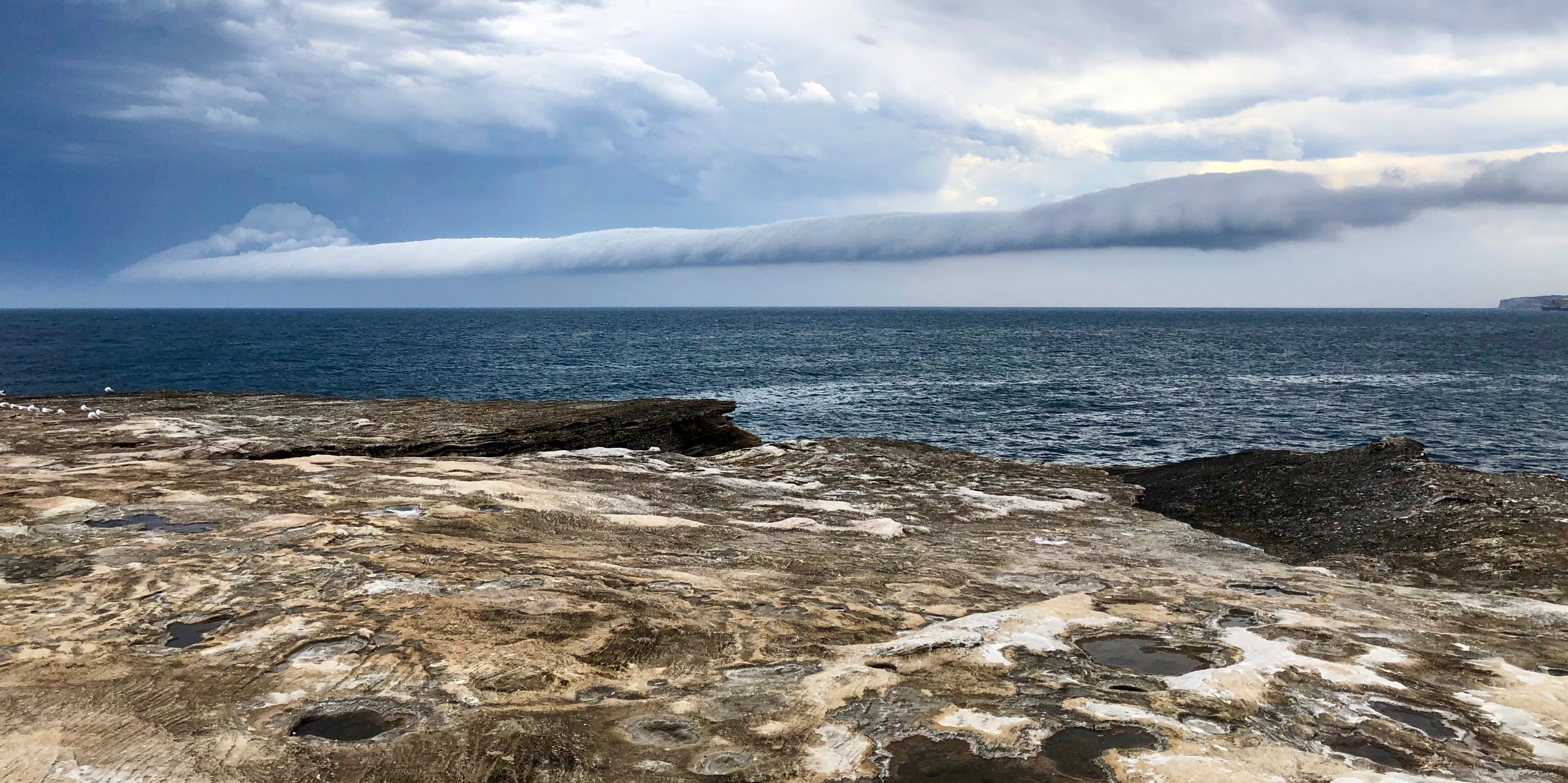
Storm rolling over Coogee Beach, December 2017

East coast lows, which strike from the southeast in the Tasman Sea, bring heavy rainfall typically in autumn to early winter. The precipitation of the low comes from a nimbostratus cloud that dumps as much as 70 mm (2.76 in) of rain for as much as two days. Sydney generally experiences between 20 and 25 thunder days a year on average. Thunderstorms arrive from the west, and normally involve northeasterly winds at the surface. In the warm season, troughs combined with a humid air mass can bring large amounts of rainfall.

The western suburbs are more inclined to receive thunderstorms in summer due to the stabilizing effect of a sea breeze in the afternoon near the CBD and Eastern Suburbs. Isolated convective showers form when a cold pool arrives from the southwest, particularly on hot and sultry days. These showers usually come in heavy downpours and can include hail, squalls, and drops in temperature, but they generally pass very quickly. Black nor'easters may bring persistent rainfall for a few consecutive days in the warm months, and Australian northwest cloudbands produce light rainfall in the cool months.

The city is rarely affected by cyclones, although remnants of ex-cyclones do affect the city. The city is prone to severe hailstorms, windstorms, and flash flooding. Scientists have predicted that rainfall will become more unpredictable and temperatures will be on the rise.

In 2011, Sydney recorded its wettest July since 1950, where the CBD recorded 244 mm (9.61 in) of rain that month. The year 2011 was also the wettest year since records began in 1858. Parts of western Sydney were substantially flooded during the New South Wales 2021 floods, with many areas around Richmond and Windsor submerged in floodwaters. In early 2022, Sydney recorded its wettest start to a year on record with the running annual total being 821.6 mm (32.35 in), topping 782.8 mm (30.82 in) to the same date in 1956 and 753.8 mm (29.68 in) in 1990, respectively (rainfall data at Sydney Observatory Hill dates back to 1858).

=== Snowfall ===
Snow is extremely rare in Sydney. The last reported significant snowfall in the city occurred on 28 June 1836, although the identification of this event as snow has subsequently been questioned. Since then, occasional reports of light or melting snow have occurred without significant accumulation. On 22 June 1951, light snowflakes were reported in several Sydney suburbs, including Liverpool, Pymble and Kingsgrove, where they reportedly melted as they fell or were mixed with rain. On 25 July 1986, melting snow was observed in the Sydney central business district, at Sydney Airport and in Bankstown, although it did not settle on the ground. On 27 July 2008, graupel, or soft hail, blanketed parts of Sydney's North Shore, including Lindfield, Roseville and Killara, producing a snow-like covering that was initially mistaken for snow by some residents. Following the event, a senior Bureau of Meteorology forecaster questioned whether the reported snowfall of 1836 may likewise have been soft hail, noting the difficulty contemporary observers would have had in distinguishing between the two forms of precipitation.

== Drought ==
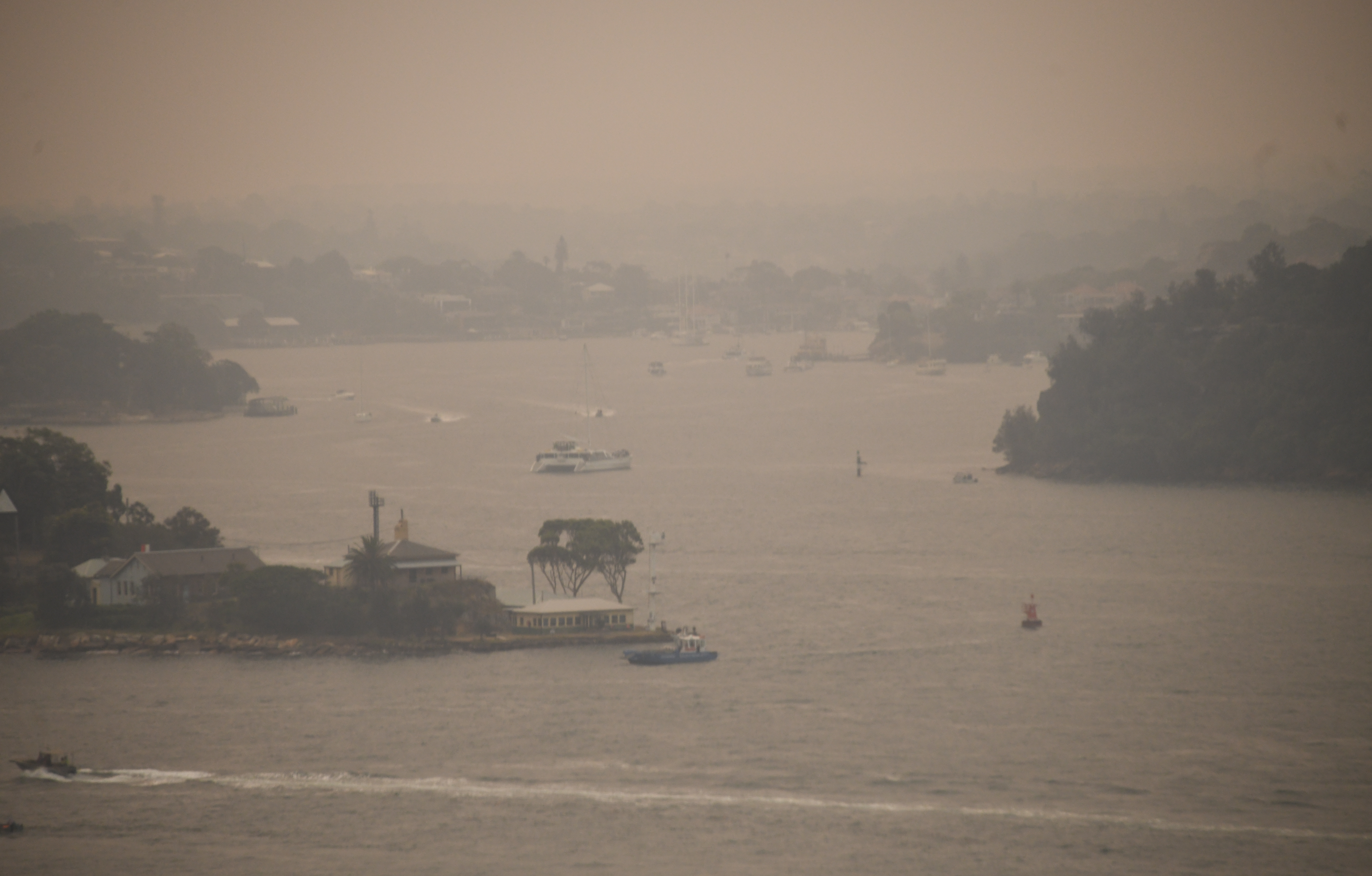
Smoke haze in the Sydney Harbour during 2019–20 bushfires.

Sydney's winter rainfall is predicted to decrease by 20-35% by the year 2090. The other phenomenon that arises from these long, dry and hot periods is bushfires, which occur frequently in the areas surrounding the city. Water supply is a recurring concern for the city during drought periods.

In 2005 the reservoirs reached an all-time low. Many areas of the city bordering bushland have experienced bushfires, notably in 1994 and 2001–02 — these tend to occur during the spring and summer. Heatwaves, which are regularly occurring in recent years, usually lead to water restrictions and a high risk of bushfires, which sometimes bring a smoky haze to the city. Smog is noticeable on hot days, even without bushfires. The years 2009 and 2010 had dry conditions, according to Bureau of Meteorology.

In September 2013, the combination of dry weather, warm temperatures and strong winds brought early-season bushfires. The summer of 2013-14 was the driest in 72 years. The widespread bushfires in December 2019 affected the western periphery of the city, and the Sydney metropolitan area suffered from dangerous smoky haze for several days throughout the month 2019 was one of Sydney's warmest in 161 years and the driest since 2005, which had a few days of raised dust and as well as declining dam levels.

== Wind ==
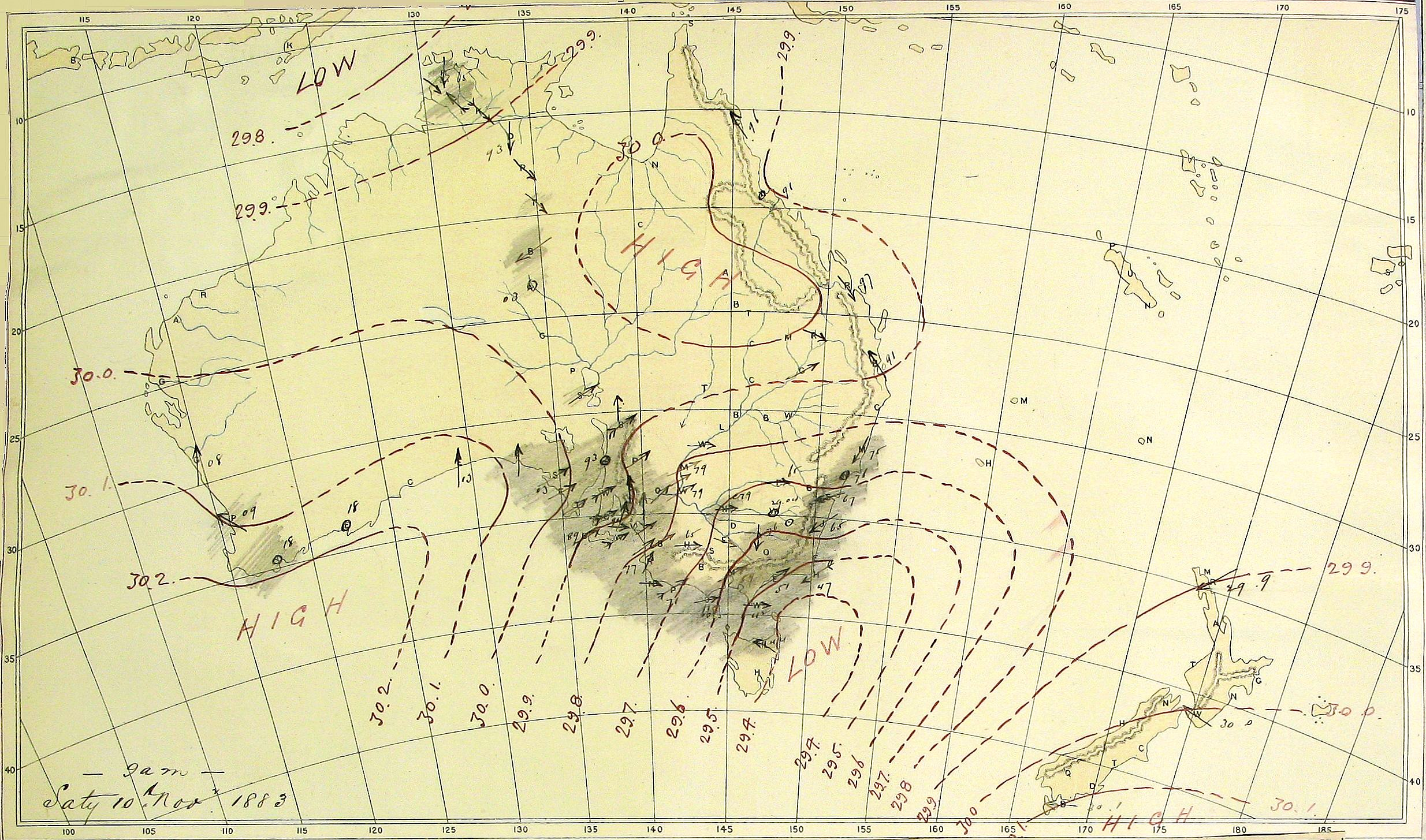
The Roaring forties as they shift towards southeastern Australia

Afternoon windspeed recorded in Sydney Airport averages at 24.3 km/h (15.0 mph) in an annual basis, making Sydney the windiest capital city in Australia. As a whole, the Sydney region is generally the windiest from October to January and calmest from March to June. The windier locations are those by the coast, such as the eastern suburbs. The prevailing winds are seasonal in coastal Sydney; northeasterly sea breezes arriving in the summer provide relief on hot days; in winter and early spring, generally strong and cool winds come from the west or north-west, which are related to large scale synoptic events. Summer winds from the south may be strong (i.e. southerly buster). Spring and autumn winds tend to be variable.

Northeasterlies and easterly sea breezes are dominant from early summer to early autumn, because the anticlockwise-rotating subtropical ridge is to the south of the city where it allows winds from the sea to penetrate. Westerlies are dominant in late winter to mid-spring as the subtropical ridge is just to the north of the city, picking up winds from the interior and blocking easterlies from the sea. Westerly winds in Sydney are intensified when the Roaring forties contract towards the southeastern Australia.

Southerly busters are expected from October to the end of March. They typically look like as if a sheet of cloud is rolled up like a scroll by the advancing wind. The change of wind (in the warm months) is sometimes very sudden, where it may be fresh northeasterly and in ten minutes a southerly gale. Katabatic winds are light, south-westerly drainage winds, akin to land breezes, that occur when air of higher density in the Blue Mountains descends under gravity force into the Sydney metropolitan area and the Hawkesbury Basin, usually during a winter night.

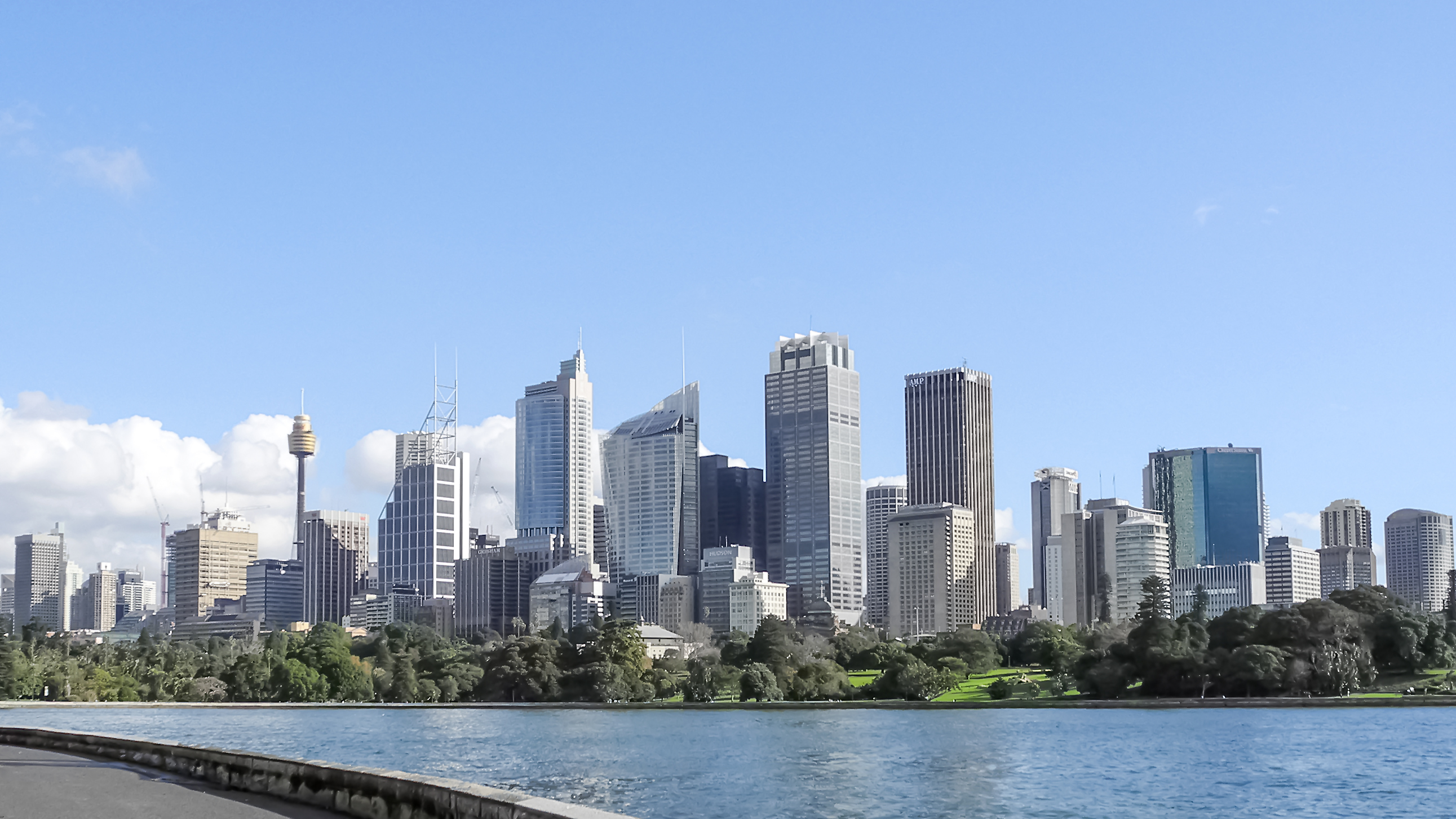
Sunny winter days in Sydney are usually a result of the foehn effect.

Since Sydney is located on the Great Dividing Range's eastern side, and is thus in its rain shadow, (Note: Sydney is only rain shadowed when it comes to westerly frontal systems that originate in the Southern Ocean (which are consequently blocked by the Great Dividing Range as they move east). The city is not entirely located in a rain shadow region as it is still exposed to moist easterlies from the Tasman Sea.) it experiences a föhn-like type of wind, particularly between late autumn and early spring, which is a dry south-westerly that raises the air temperature and provides clear to partly sunny conditions in the lee of the mountains (in this case, the Sydney Basin), after the arrival of a vigorous westerly cold front from the Southern Ocean. In the cool season, these föhn-like winds can be particularly damaging to homes and affect flights.

Wind direction in Sydney from 2002 to 2012 (average values)
North	Northeast	East	South East	Southern	Southwest	West	Northwest
5.9%	16.9%	14.1%	14.6%	24.9%	4.1%	11.9%	7.6%
Source: world-weather.info

=== Air masses ===
Sydney is affected by five air mass types throughout the year:

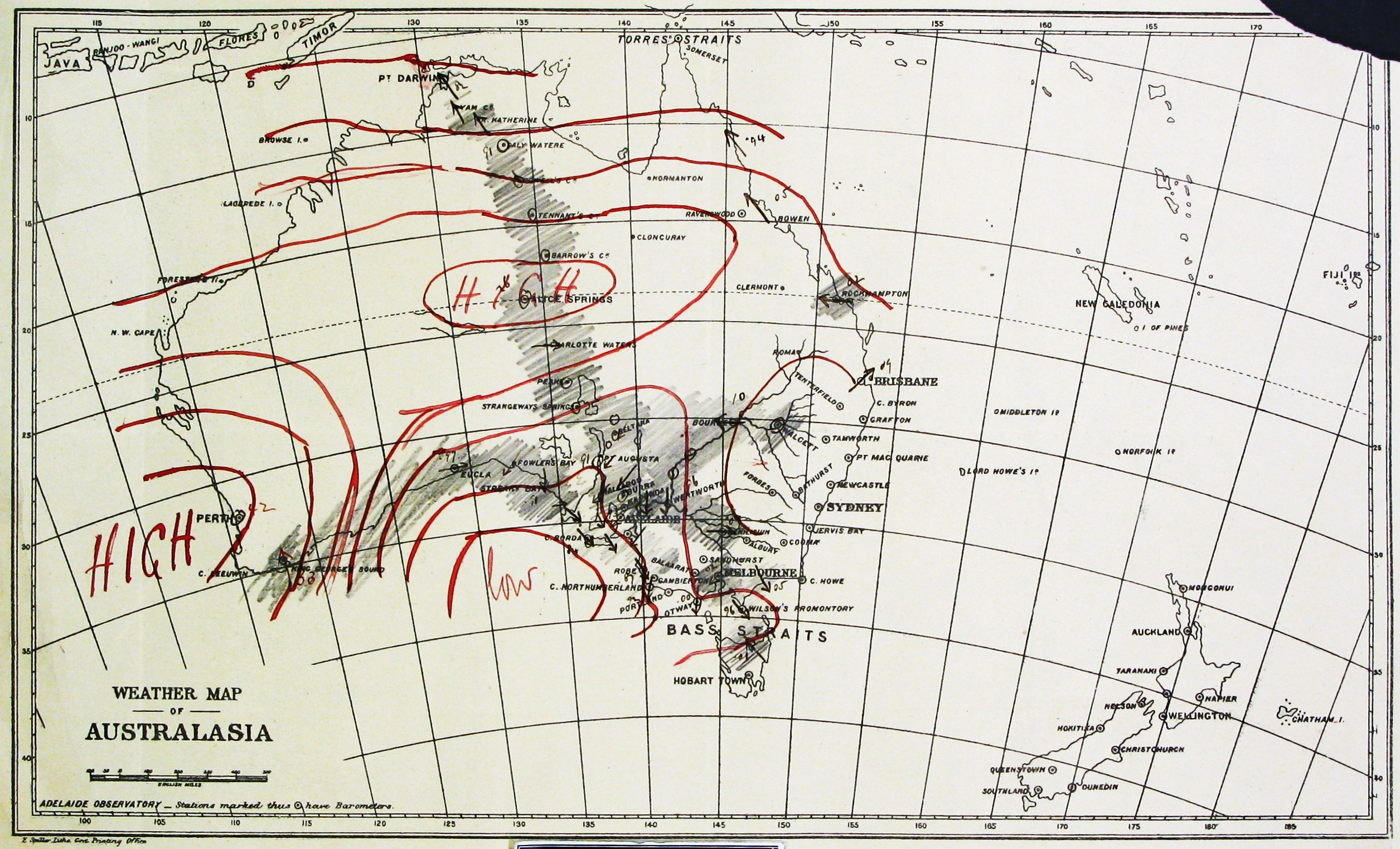
The region of Sydney being affected by the Subtropical continental (ST) airmass

- Tropical continental (CT): Very hot, dry air from northern half of central Australia that can bring extreme heat, typically from late spring to summer (i.e. brickfielder). These come from the northwest and are called north-westerlies.
- Tropical maritime Tasman (MT): Mild to warm, moist airmass from the northern Tasman Sea that brings overcast, humid, sometimes showery conditions and even heavy rain at any time of the year (i.e. east coast lows, black nor'easters). These are north-easterlies or northerlies.
- Subtropical continental (ST): Mild to warm, dry air from southern central Australia that is more dominant in late winter to early spring (i.e. the Australian High). These are westerlies.
- Southern maritime (SM): Mild to cool, moist air from the Southern Ocean that brings drizzle and, at times, cloud cover at any time of the year (i.e. southerly busters). These are southerlies or south-easterlies.
- Modified polar maritime (MP): Cool, sometimes cold, generally dry airmass, typically occurring in winter (though not unknown in late autumn and early spring), that can be very windy when it arrives from the southwest over the Great Dividing Ranges (i.e. southeast Australian foehn). (Note: Although maritime in origin, this airmass becomes dry in the lee of Ranges. Incidentally, the foehn effect is also observed when hot, dry northwesterly winds impact the region, as they too cross the Ranges.) These are south-westerlies.

== Climate data ==
^{[note a]}

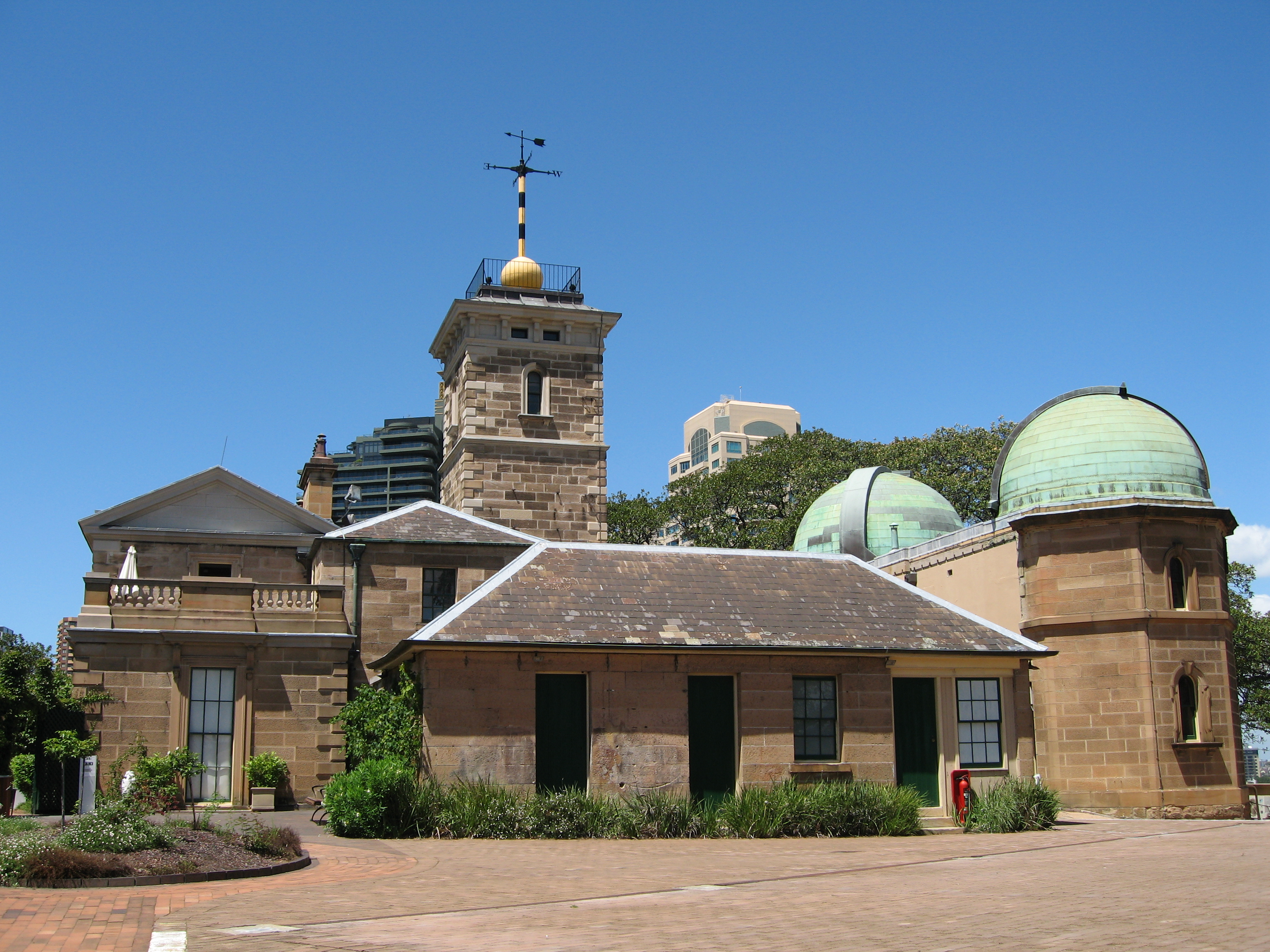
The weather of the Sydney CBD is recorded at Observatory Hill.

Climate data for Sydney (Observatory Hill) 1991–2020 averages, 1861–present extremes
Month	Jan	Feb	Mar	Apr	May	Jun	Jul	Aug	Sep	Oct	Nov	Dec	Year
Record high °C (°F)	45.8 (114.4)	42.1 (107.8)	39.8 (103.6)	35.4 (95.7)	30.0 (86.0)	26.9 (80.4)	26.5 (79.7)	31.3 (88.3)	34.6 (94.3)	38.2 (100.8)	41.8 (107.2)	42.2 (108.0)	45.8 (114.4)
Mean maximum °C (°F)	36.8 (98.2)	34.1 (93.4)	32.2 (90.0)	29.7 (85.5)	26.2 (79.2)	22.3 (72.1)	22.9 (73.2)	25.4 (77.7)	29.9 (85.8)	33.6 (92.5)	34.1 (93.4)	34.4 (93.9)	38.8 (101.8)
Mean daily maximum °C (°F)	27.0 (80.6)	26.8 (80.2)	25.7 (78.3)	23.6 (74.5)	20.9 (69.6)	18.3 (64.9)	17.9 (64.2)	19.3 (66.7)	21.6 (70.9)	23.2 (73.8)	24.2 (75.6)	25.7 (78.3)	22.8 (73.0)
Daily mean °C (°F)	23.5 (74.3)	23.4 (74.1)	22.1 (71.8)	19.5 (67.1)	16.6 (61.9)	14.2 (57.6)	13.4 (56.1)	14.5 (58.1)	17.0 (62.6)	18.9 (66.0)	20.4 (68.7)	22.1 (71.8)	18.8 (65.8)
Mean daily minimum °C (°F)	20.0 (68.0)	19.9 (67.8)	18.4 (65.1)	15.3 (59.5)	12.3 (54.1)	10.0 (50.0)	8.9 (48.0)	9.7 (49.5)	12.3 (54.1)	14.6 (58.3)	16.6 (61.9)	18.4 (65.1)	14.7 (58.5)
Mean minimum °C (°F)	16.1 (61.0)	16.1 (61.0)	14.2 (57.6)	11.0 (51.8)	8.3 (46.9)	6.5 (43.7)	5.7 (42.3)	6.1 (43.0)	8.0 (46.4)	9.8 (49.6)	12.0 (53.6)	13.9 (57.0)	5.3 (41.5)
Record low °C (°F)	10.6 (51.1)	9.6 (49.3)	9.3 (48.7)	7.0 (44.6)	4.4 (39.9)	2.1 (35.8)	2.2 (36.0)	2.7 (36.9)	4.9 (40.8)	5.7 (42.3)	7.7 (45.9)	9.1 (48.4)	2.1 (35.8)
Average rainfall mm (inches)	91.1 (3.59)	131.5 (5.18)	117.5 (4.63)	114.1 (4.49)	100.8 (3.97)	142.0 (5.59)	80.3 (3.16)	75.1 (2.96)	63.4 (2.50)	67.7 (2.67)	90.6 (3.57)	73.0 (2.87)	1,149.7 (45.26)
Average rainy days (≥ 1 mm)	8.2	9.0	10.1	7.9	7.9	9.3	7.2	5.6	5.8	7.6	8.7	7.9	95.2
Average afternoon relative humidity (%)	60	62	59	58	58	56	52	47	49	53	57	58	56
Average dew point °C (°F)	16.5 (61.7)	17.2 (63.0)	15.4 (59.7)	12.7 (54.9)	10.3 (50.5)	7.8 (46.0)	6.1 (43.0)	5.4 (41.7)	7.8 (46.0)	10.2 (50.4)	12.6 (54.7)	14.6 (58.3)	11.4 (52.5)
Mean monthly sunshine hours	232.5	205.9	210.8	213.0	204.6	171.0	207.7	248.0	243.0	244.9	222.0	235.6	2,639
Percentage possible sunshine	53	54	55	63	63	57	66	72	67	61	55	55	60
Source 1: Bureau of Meteorology
Source 2: Bureau of Meteorology, Sydney Airport (sunshine hours)

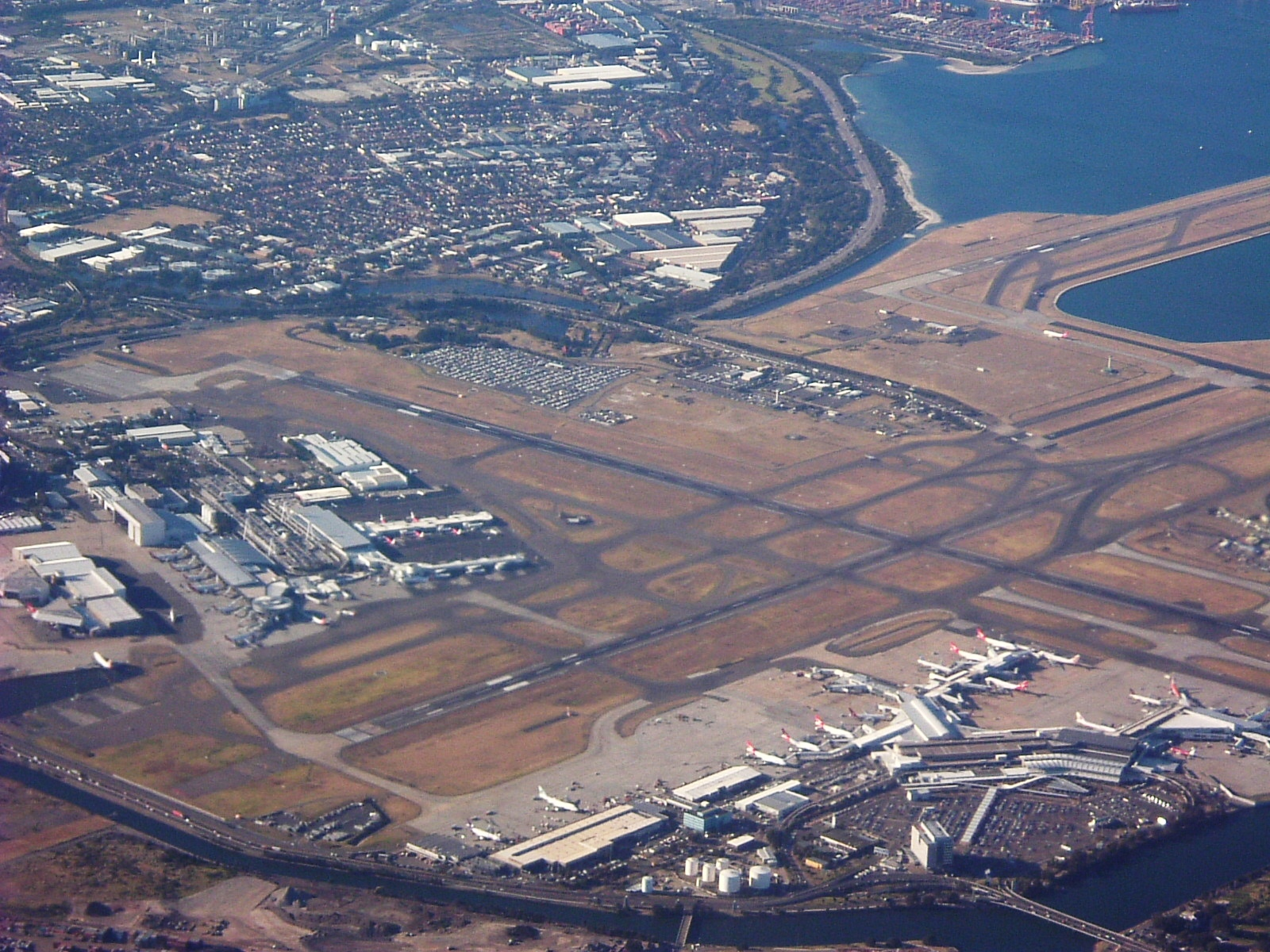
Sydney's second official weather station is located at Sydney Airport

Climate data for Sydney Airport (Southeastern Sydney, St George, parts of Southern Sydney, and southern City of Sydney)
Month	Jan	Feb	Mar	Apr	May	Jun	Jul	Aug	Sep	Oct	Nov	Dec	Year
Record high °C (°F)	46.4 (115.5)	42.9 (109.2)	41.2 (106.2)	36.8 (98.2)	30.0 (86.0)	26.8 (80.2)	27.0 (80.6)	31.6 (88.9)	35.9 (96.6)	39.1 (102.4)	43.4 (110.1)	43.5 (110.3)	46.4 (115.5)
Mean daily maximum °C (°F)	27.7 (81.9)	27.1 (80.8)	25.8 (78.4)	23.3 (73.9)	20.6 (69.1)	18.1 (64.6)	17.7 (63.9)	19.1 (66.4)	21.6 (70.9)	23.6 (74.5)	24.6 (76.3)	26.4 (79.5)	23.0 (73.4)
Mean daily minimum °C (°F)	20.0 (68.0)	20.0 (68.0)	18.5 (65.3)	15.2 (59.4)	12.1 (53.8)	9.8 (49.6)	8.5 (47.3)	9.3 (48.7)	11.9 (53.4)	14.4 (57.9)	16.5 (61.7)	18.4 (65.1)	14.5 (58.1)
Record low °C (°F)	9.7 (49.5)	11.2 (52.2)	7.4 (45.3)	6.1 (43.0)	3.0 (37.4)	1.0 (33.8)	−0.1 (31.8)	1.2 (34.2)	2.3 (36.1)	4.8 (40.6)	5.9 (42.6)	8.2 (46.8)	−0.1 (31.8)
Average rainfall mm (inches)	80.7 (3.18)	117.2 (4.61)	96.3 (3.79)	98.2 (3.87)	89.3 (3.52)	125.9 (4.96)	69.5 (2.74)	63.3 (2.49)	59.0 (2.32)	55.5 (2.19)	72.3 (2.85)	67.1 (2.64)	996.2 (39.22)
Average rainy days (≥ 1 mm)	7.8	8.6	9.4	8.2	7.6	8.9	7.0	5.4	6.3	7.4	8.6	7.9	93.1
Average afternoon relative humidity (%)	59	62	60	58	59	58	53	46	49	52	56	57	56
Average dew point °C (°F)	16.2 (61.2)	16.8 (62.2)	15.5 (59.9)	12.7 (54.9)	9.9 (49.8)	7.6 (45.7)	5.6 (42.1)	5.5 (41.9)	7.7 (45.9)	9.9 (49.8)	12.3 (54.1)	14.3 (57.7)	11.2 (52.2)
Mean monthly sunshine hours	232.5	205.9	210.8	213.0	204.6	171.0	207.7	248.0	243.0	244.9	222.0	235.6	2,639
Source: Bureau of Meteorology (1991-2020 averages, records 1939-)

Climate data for Parramatta (Western Sydney)
Month	Jan	Feb	Mar	Apr	May	Jun	Jul	Aug	Sep	Oct	Nov	Dec	Year
Record high °C (°F)	47.0 (116.6)	44.5 (112.1)	40.5 (104.9)	37.0 (98.6)	29.2 (84.6)	25.5 (77.9)	26.8 (80.2)	30.6 (87.1)	36.5 (97.7)	40.1 (104.2)	42.7 (108.9)	44.0 (111.2)	47.0 (116.6)
Mean daily maximum °C (°F)	28.6 (83.5)	27.9 (82.2)	26.3 (79.3)	23.8 (74.8)	20.6 (69.1)	17.8 (64.0)	17.4 (63.3)	19.1 (66.4)	21.7 (71.1)	24.0 (75.2)	25.4 (77.7)	27.5 (81.5)	23.3 (73.9)
Mean daily minimum °C (°F)	17.6 (63.7)	17.6 (63.7)	15.9 (60.6)	12.8 (55.0)	9.9 (49.8)	7.5 (45.5)	6.3 (43.3)	7.1 (44.8)	9.4 (48.9)	12.0 (53.6)	14.1 (57.4)	16.3 (61.3)	12.2 (54.0)
Record low °C (°F)	10.1 (50.2)	9.2 (48.6)	6.8 (44.2)	4.0 (39.2)	1.4 (34.5)	0.8 (33.4)	−1.0 (30.2)	0.7 (33.3)	0.7 (33.3)	3.6 (38.5)	4.0 (39.2)	7.7 (45.9)	−1.0 (30.2)
Average rainfall mm (inches)	100.7 (3.96)	124.8 (4.91)	109.3 (4.30)	88.5 (3.48)	70.5 (2.78)	87.1 (3.43)	45.6 (1.80)	56.1 (2.21)	52.8 (2.08)	68.1 (2.68)	87.0 (3.43)	70.2 (2.76)	958.6 (37.74)
Average rainy days (≥ 1 mm)	9.0	9.3	10.1	7.1	6.9	7.5	5.6	5.2	5.8	7.5	8.7	7.7	90.4
Average afternoon relative humidity (%)	57	59	59	58	60	59	55	46	46	49	54	55	55
Average dew point °C (°F)	16.7 (62.1)	17.2 (63.0)	15.6 (60.1)	12.5 (54.5)	10.6 (51.1)	8.3 (46.9)	6.7 (44.1)	5.5 (41.9)	7.4 (45.3)	10.0 (50.0)	12.8 (55.0)	14.9 (58.8)	11.5 (52.7)
Source 1: Bureau of Meteorology
Source 2:

Climate data for Bankstown Airport (South Western Sydney)
Month	Jan	Feb	Mar	Apr	May	Jun	Jul	Aug	Sep	Oct	Nov	Dec	Year
Record high °C (°F)	47.0 (116.6)	45.3 (113.5)	41.3 (106.3)	36.9 (98.4)	28.8 (83.8)	25.4 (77.7)	26.8 (80.2)	30.5 (86.9)	35.6 (96.1)	39.7 (103.5)	43.1 (109.6)	44.9 (112.8)	47.0 (116.6)
Mean daily maximum °C (°F)	29.0 (84.2)	28.2 (82.8)	26.5 (79.7)	24.0 (75.2)	20.8 (69.4)	18.0 (64.4)	17.6 (63.7)	19.3 (66.7)	22.2 (72.0)	24.4 (75.9)	25.8 (78.4)	27.6 (81.7)	23.6 (74.5)
Daily mean °C (°F)	23.8 (74.8)	23.3 (73.9)	21.5 (70.7)	18.4 (65.1)	15.1 (59.2)	12.5 (54.5)	11.5 (52.7)	12.7 (54.9)	15.6 (60.1)	18.2 (64.8)	20.3 (68.5)	22.2 (72.0)	17.9 (64.3)
Mean daily minimum °C (°F)	18.5 (65.3)	18.3 (64.9)	16.4 (61.5)	12.8 (55.0)	9.3 (48.7)	6.9 (44.4)	5.4 (41.7)	6.0 (42.8)	8.9 (48.0)	12.0 (53.6)	14.7 (58.5)	16.8 (62.2)	12.2 (53.9)
Record low °C (°F)	10.4 (50.7)	10.0 (50.0)	7.8 (46.0)	2.4 (36.3)	0.7 (33.3)	−1.9 (28.6)	−4.0 (24.8)	−0.7 (30.7)	0.0 (32.0)	4.8 (40.6)	6.8 (44.2)	6.3 (43.3)	−4.0 (24.8)
Average precipitation mm (inches)	87.3 (3.44)	107.3 (4.22)	81.7 (3.22)	67.1 (2.64)	55.1 (2.17)	83.0 (3.27)	44.5 (1.75)	42.7 (1.68)	44.2 (1.74)	53.2 (2.09)	67.8 (2.67)	66.6 (2.62)	800.5 (31.51)
Average precipitation days (≥ 1.0 mm)	7.6	7.4	8.3	6.2	5.8	6.8	5.4	3.9	5.0	6.0	7.4	7.5	77.3
Average relative humidity (%)	62.5	67.0	66.5	63.5	66.5	67.5	65.0	55.5	53.5	54.5	60.0	60.0	61.8
Average dew point °C (°F)	16.3 (61.3)	17.1 (62.8)	15.2 (59.4)	12.1 (53.8)	9.7 (49.5)	7.5 (45.5)	6.0 (42.8)	5.2 (41.4)	7.4 (45.3)	9.7 (49.5)	12.4 (54.3)	14.4 (57.9)	11.1 (52.0)
Source: Bureau of Meteorology

Climate data for Penrith (Outer Western Sydney)
Month	Jan	Feb	Mar	Apr	May	Jun	Jul	Aug	Sep	Oct	Nov	Dec	Year
Record high °C (°F)	48.9 (120.0)	46.9 (116.4)	40.6 (105.1)	36.6 (97.9)	29.4 (84.9)	26.0 (78.8)	28.2 (82.8)	30.3 (86.5)	37.3 (99.1)	38.9 (102.0)	44.9 (112.8)	46.3 (115.3)	48.9 (120.0)
Mean daily maximum °C (°F)	30.8 (87.4)	29.3 (84.7)	27.5 (81.5)	24.4 (75.9)	21.0 (69.8)	18.1 (64.6)	17.7 (63.9)	19.9 (67.8)	23.3 (73.9)	25.9 (78.6)	27.3 (81.1)	29.2 (84.6)	24.5 (76.1)
Daily mean °C (°F)	24.8 (76.6)	23.9 (75.0)	22.1 (71.8)	18.8 (65.8)	15.2 (59.4)	12.5 (54.5)	11.6 (52.9)	13.1 (55.6)	16.4 (61.5)	19.0 (66.2)	21.2 (70.2)	23.1 (73.6)	18.4 (65.1)
Mean daily minimum °C (°F)	18.5 (65.3)	18.5 (65.3)	16.6 (61.9)	13.1 (55.6)	9.3 (48.7)	6.9 (44.4)	5.4 (41.7)	6.2 (43.2)	9.4 (48.9)	12.1 (53.8)	15.0 (59.0)	16.9 (62.4)	12.3 (54.1)
Record low °C (°F)	10.6 (51.1)	11.6 (52.9)	8.3 (46.9)	3.6 (38.5)	0.6 (33.1)	−1.1 (30.0)	−1.8 (28.8)	−0.5 (31.1)	2.2 (36.0)	5.0 (41.0)	6.8 (44.2)	9.8 (49.6)	−1.8 (28.8)
Average precipitation mm (inches)	90.4 (3.56)	131.6 (5.18)	73.1 (2.88)	42.2 (1.66)	40.0 (1.57)	51.6 (2.03)	29.6 (1.17)	30.1 (1.19)	31.9 (1.26)	54.5 (2.15)	82.9 (3.26)	60.1 (2.37)	719.2 (28.31)
Average precipitation days (≥ 1 mm)	7.7	8.3	8.8	5.6	4.3	5.6	4.2	3.3	4.6	5.6	8.0	7.4	73.4
Average afternoon relative humidity (%)	47	53	52	49	52	55	50	41	40	41	46	45	48
Average dew point °C (°F)	14.7 (58.5)	16.2 (61.2)	14.4 (57.9)	10.8 (51.4)	8.9 (48.0)	7.2 (45.0)	5.2 (41.4)	3.9 (39.0)	6.2 (43.2)	7.5 (45.5)	10.8 (51.4)	12.6 (54.7)	9.9 (49.8)

Climate data for Camden Airport AWS (MacArthur)
Month	Jan	Feb	Mar	Apr	May	Jun	Jul	Aug	Sep	Oct	Nov	Dec	Year
Record high °C (°F)	46.4 (115.5)	45.6 (114.1)	41.0 (105.8)	38.5 (101.3)	29.5 (85.1)	24.9 (76.8)	27.0 (80.6)	30.2 (86.4)	36.5 (97.7)	40.5 (104.9)	42.6 (108.7)	44.0 (111.2)	46.4 (115.5)
Mean daily maximum °C (°F)	29.5 (85.1)	28.6 (83.5)	26.8 (80.2)	23.8 (74.8)	20.6 (69.1)	17.7 (63.9)	17.3 (63.1)	19.0 (66.2)	21.9 (71.4)	24.3 (75.7)	26.3 (79.3)	28.5 (83.3)	23.7 (74.7)
Mean daily minimum °C (°F)	16.8 (62.2)	16.8 (62.2)	14.9 (58.8)	11.1 (52.0)	7.1 (44.8)	4.6 (40.3)	3.0 (37.4)	3.9 (39.0)	6.8 (44.2)	9.9 (49.8)	13.0 (55.4)	15.2 (59.4)	10.2 (50.4)
Record low °C (°F)	7.9 (46.2)	7.2 (45.0)	5.9 (42.6)	−0.7 (30.7)	−2.2 (28.0)	−5.4 (22.3)	−6.0 (21.2)	−4.0 (24.8)	−1.8 (28.8)	1.3 (34.3)	3.8 (38.8)	5.7 (42.3)	−6.0 (21.2)
Average precipitation mm (inches)	84.1 (3.31)	96.9 (3.81)	89.3 (3.52)	68.5 (2.70)	53.5 (2.11)	67.0 (2.64)	37.6 (1.48)	46.0 (1.81)	39.6 (1.56)	61.2 (2.41)	75.8 (2.98)	56.8 (2.24)	777.3 (30.60)
Average precipitation days (≥ 1 mm)	5.0	5.1	5.1	4.1	3.6	3.6	3.0	2.9	3.2	4.4	4.9	4.4	49.3
Average afternoon relative humidity (%)	49	52	52	52	52	53	50	43	44	47	50	46	49
Average dew point °C (°F)	14.7 (58.5)	15.1 (59.2)	13.8 (56.8)	11.0 (51.8)	8.5 (47.3)	6.2 (43.2)	4.7 (40.5)	4.0 (39.2)	6.2 (43.2)	8.8 (47.8)	11.6 (52.9)	12.5 (54.5)	9.8 (49.6)

^[note a]: The Observatory Hill weather station covers the climate for Sydney CBD, the City of Sydney's northern portion and as well as the harbourside eastern suburbs and the Lower North Shore suburbs which lie on Port Jackson. The suburbs in the southern parts of the City of Sydney or the Inner City region are more adjacent to Sydney Airport's climate station.

Climate data for Sydney CBD (miscellaneous data)
Month	Jan	Feb	Mar	Apr	May	Jun	Jul	Aug	Sep	Oct	Nov	Dec	Year
Average dew point °C (°F)	16.5 (61.7)	17.2 (63.0)	15.4 (59.7)	12.7 (54.9)	10.3 (50.5)	7.8 (46.0)	6.1 (43.0)	5.4 (41.7)	7.8 (46.0)	10.2 (50.4)	12.6 (54.7)	14.6 (58.3)	11.4 (52.5)
Mean daily sunshine hours	7.5	7.1	6.8	7.1	6.6	5.7	6.7	8.0	8.1	7.9	7.5	7.6	7.2
Mean daily daylight hours	13.5	13.4	12.4	11.3	10.4	10.0	10.1	10.9	11.9	13.0	13.9	14.4	12.1
Percentage possible sunshine	53	54	56	61	59	60	65	72	66	61	55	55	60
Average ultraviolet index	12	11	8	5	3	2	3	3	5	8	10	11	7
Source 1: Bureau of Meteorology
Source 2: Bureau of Meteorology (UV index)

Sea temperature
Month	January	February	March	April	May	June	July	August	September	October	November	December	Year
Average sea temperature °C (°F)	23.3 (73.9)	23.7 (74.7)	23.4 (74.1)	22.7 (72.8)	20.7 (69.3)	19.3 (66.8)	19.1 (66.4)	18.8 (65.8)	18.5 (65.3)	19.2 (66.5)	20.6 (69.0)	21.9 (71.4)	20.9 (69.6)
Source: Metoc (sea temperature)

=== Classifications ===
Sydney Climate according to major climate systems
Climatic scheme	Initials	Description
Köppen system	Cfa	Humid subtropical climate
Trewartha system	Cf	Subtropical humid climate
Alisov system	—N/a	Subtropical oceanic climate
Strahler system	—N/a	Moist subtropical climate
Thornthwaite system	B1 B'2	Humid and mesothermal
Neef system	—N/a	Humid climate of trade winds

== See also ==
- Climate of Australia
- Geography of Sydney
- Environment of Australia
- Australian region tropical cyclone
- Climate change in Australia
- Effects of global warming on Australia
- Effects of the El Niño–Southern Oscillation in Australia
- Severe weather events in Sydney
