= Australian High =

Semi-permanent high-pressure system over Southern Australia

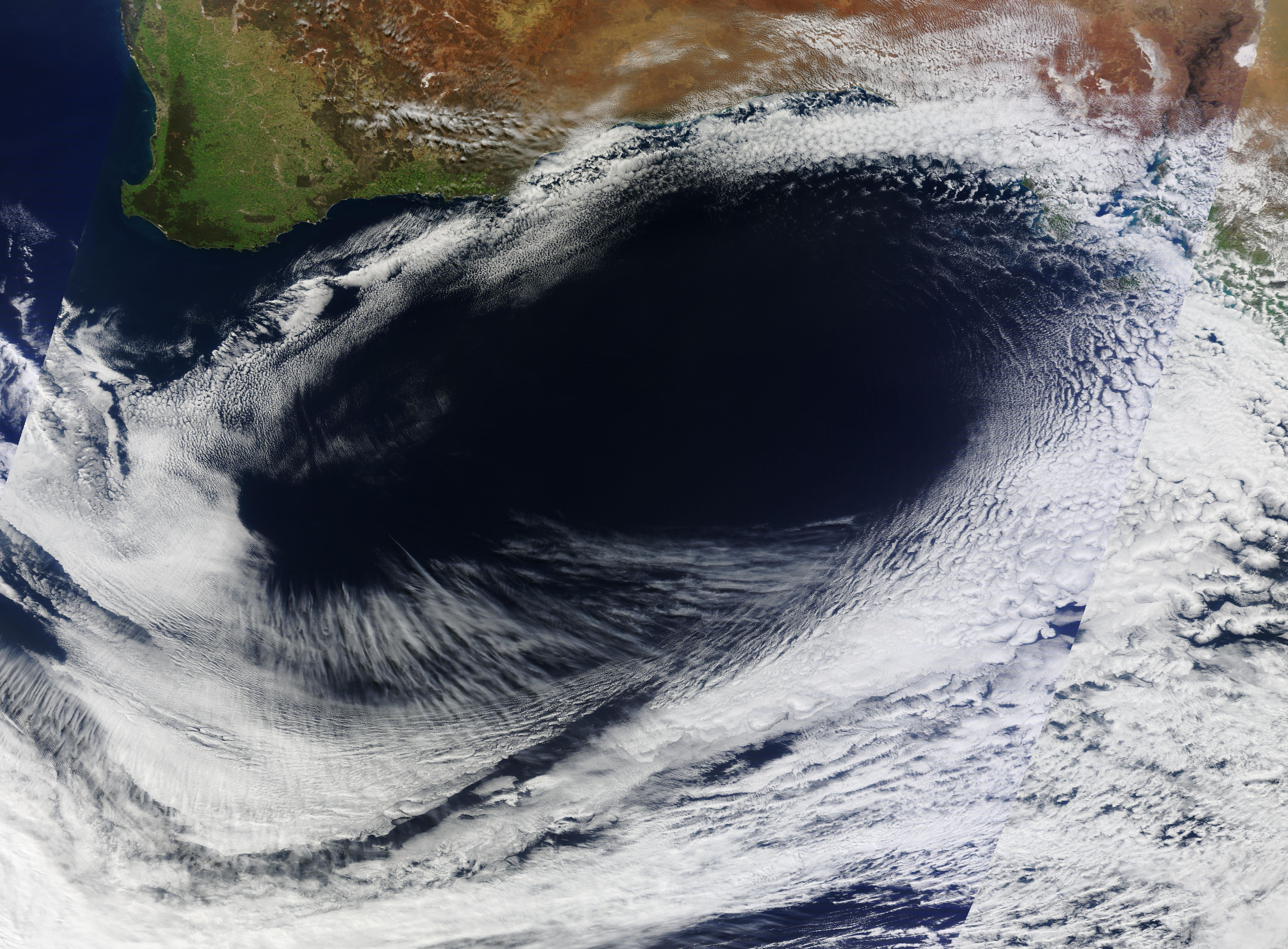
- The high featuring an anticlockwise rotation around an oval area of clear skies.
- Area of occurrence: Great Australian Bight, Western Australia and Southern Australia (summer); Central, eastern, and northern Australia (winter)
- Season: All-year round
- Effect: Drought in the west and south (summer); Drier conditions, and at times drought, in the centre, north and east (winter)

The Australian High, also known as the Australian subtropical ridge, is a large, semi-permanent high pressure area or subtropical anticyclone that seasonally vacillates between the Great Australian Bight in the south to the Northern Territory in the north. It is generally located between 25 and 40 degrees of south latitude, depending on the season.

In summer, it typically sits over southern Australia as an Australian Bight High, where it generally provides dry weather in the proximate region. In winter it normally moves north, therefore permitting cold fronts and low pressure systems to relocate up from the Great Australian Bight and bring rainfall to most parts of southern Australia. The high is part of the subtropical ridge system and it is the reason why a large part of Australia is arid to semi-arid.

== Description ==
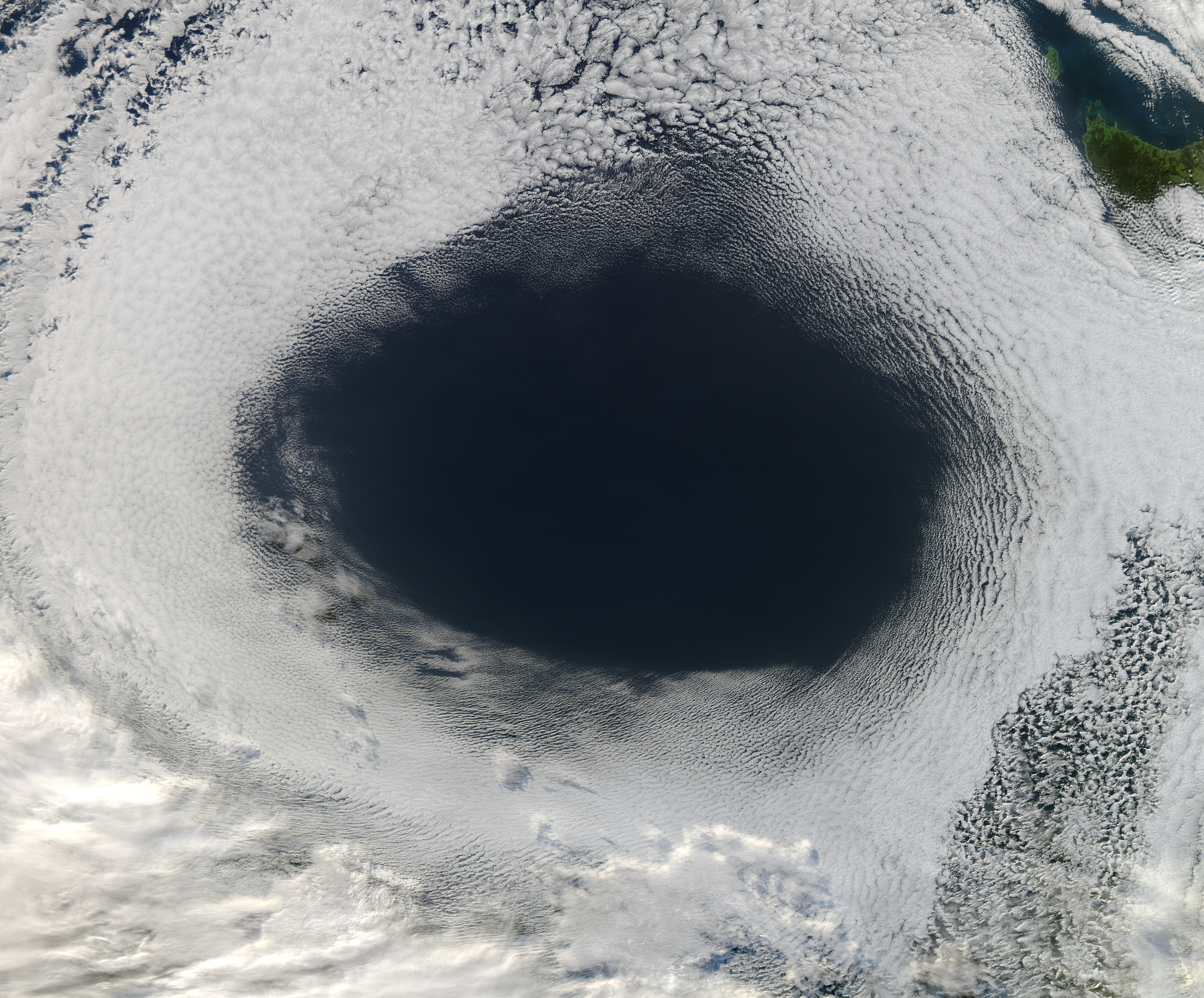
The Australian High west of Tasmania over the Indian Ocean

The Australian High tends to follow the seasonal variation in position of the sun; it is strongest and most persistent during the southern hemisphere summer and weakest during winter when it shifts towards the interior of Australia, as the westerly frontal systems becomes more active in the region around the Bight, thereby allowing cold fronts and low-pressure systems to perforate the southern states.

This high-pressure block exhibits anticyclonic behaviour, circulating the air anticlockwise. It remains almost stationary for a prolonged period over the Bight, hence obstructing the typical easterly procession of weather systems across southern Australia.

A cloud hole with an expansion as far as 1,000 kilometers (620 miles) has been observed, with tops of 1,040 millibars. The high may be extensive enough to interconnect with the Tasman High over in the Tasman Sea, just near New Zealand.

== Effects ==
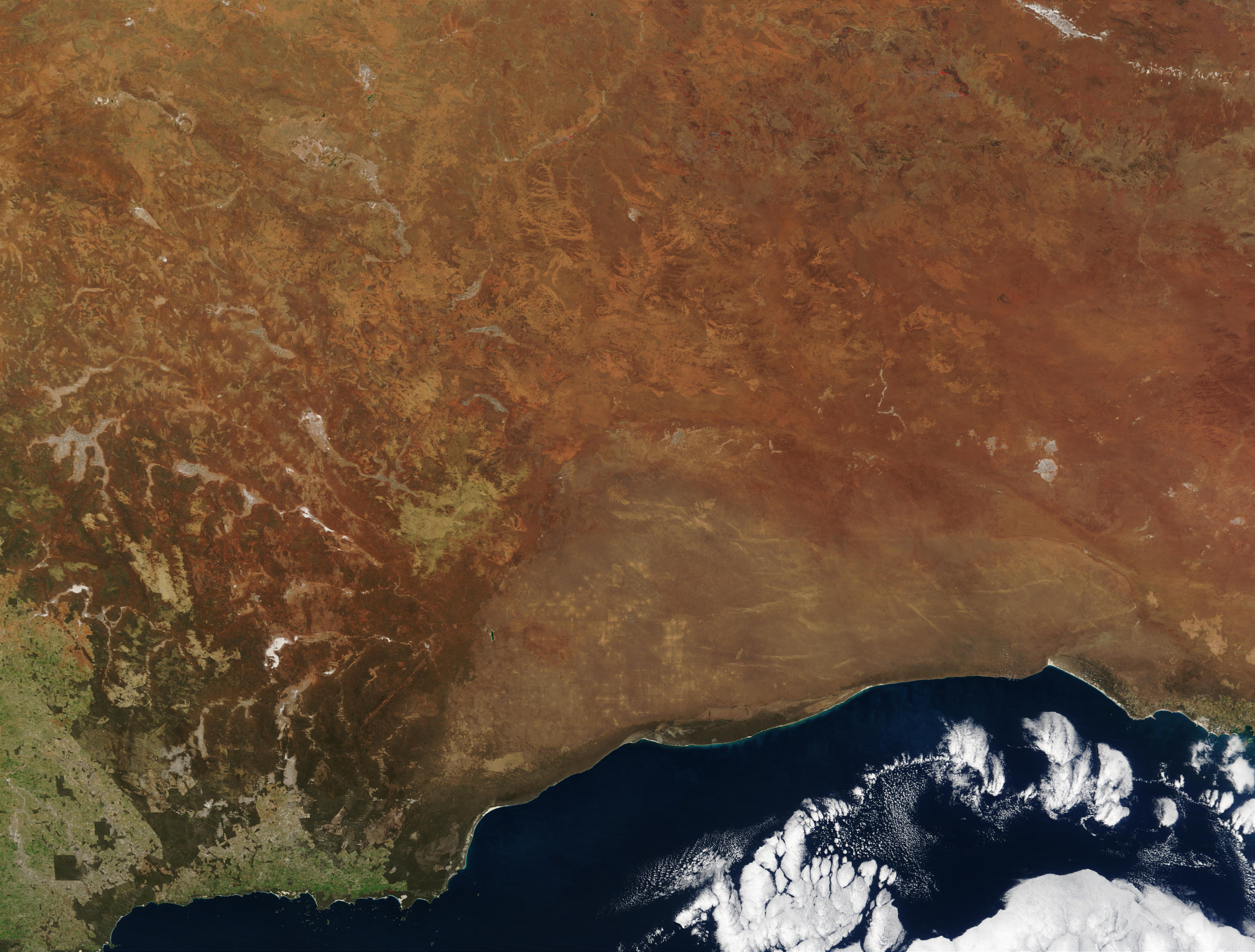
The high tends to keep the southern half of Australia mostly clear and dry.

The anticyclonic circulation produces a dry climate, bringing warm to hot weather in the southern Australian summer. The high influences the weather and climatic patterns of vast areas of Australia; The aridity of the Australian deserts and the summer drought of southern Australia is due to the large-scale subsidence and sinking motion of air in the system.

In winter, when the high remains stationary in southern Australia (in a positive SAM phase), it can block or replace cold fronts from the Bight, thereby allowing warm weather to the southeast. However, when the high remains fixed south of Western Australia, it can drive in polar air towards the continent, whereby increasing snowfall and rain in the southeast, particularly areas that lie west of the Great Dividing Range (due to the foehn effect). Conversely, a large high stationed below South Australia can bring persistent rainfall to the east coast of Australia, whilst proving clear conditions to Tasmania.

In the western part of the high, hot dry northerly winds from the dry centre push through South Australia and Victoria, ensuing heatwave conditions in these regions. The Australian High is one the drivers of the Southerly buster, which occurs in the southeast coast in the summer. In winter, when the high pressure system is broad over the Australian landmass, widespread frost may occur.

=== Effects on Asia ===
During the southern winter, the Australian High is one of the driving forces behind the South Asian Monsoon. Easterly winds blow from the center of the high towards Asia, and are deflected in a southwest direction towards India after crossing the equator due to the Coriolis effect.

== Tasman High ==
Between summer and autumn, the high over southern Australia may be linked, or would intertwine, with the Tasman High in the southern Tasman Sea. When the high stalls in the Tasman Sea and becomes a blocking high, New Zealand and Tasmania will generally experience warm and generally dry weather, whilst the east coast of Australia (particularly southern Queensland and New South Wales) will experience moist onshore flows, particularly during a La Niña phase. In March 2021, and also in February and March 2022, a stubborn blocking high in the south Tasman Sea caused heavy rain and flooding over large parts of Southeast Queensland and coastal New South Wales.

== See also ==
- Climate of Australia
- Brickfielder
