= 1947 Sydney hailstorm =

Natural disaster in Sydney, Australia

Coordinates: 33°51′35″S 151°12′40″E

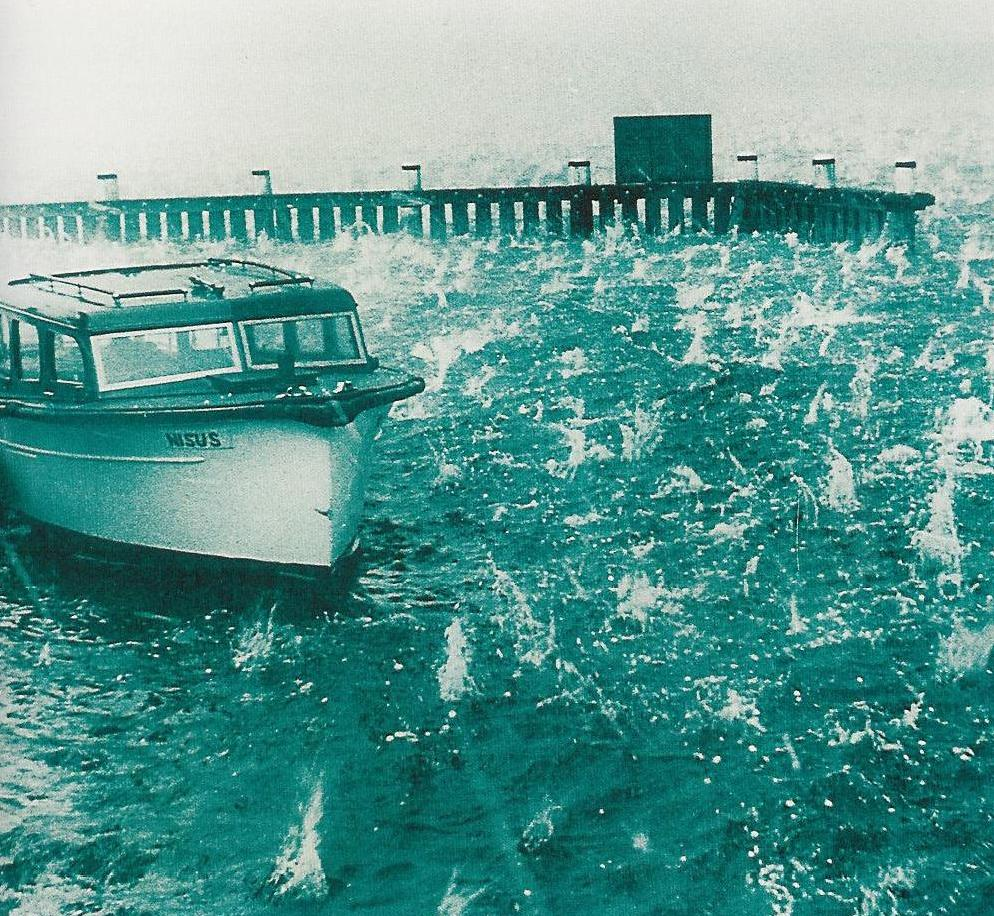
- A boat at Rose Bay in water which is being churned by the hailstones.

Meteorological history
- Formed: 10:00 am, 1 January 1947; Over Blue Mountains
- Dissipated: 3:30 pm, 1 January 1947; East of Bondi, offshore

Overall effects
- Damage: £750,000 (est., 1947); A$45 million (est., 2007)

The 1947 Sydney hailstorm was a natural disaster which struck Sydney, Australia, on 1 January 1947. The storm cell developed on the morning of New Year's Day, a public holiday in Australia, over the Blue Mountains, hitting the city and dissipating east of Bondi in the mid-afternoon. At the time, it was the most severe storm to strike the city since recorded observations began in 1792.

The high humidity, temperatures and weather patterns of Sydney increased the strength of the storm. The cost of damages from the storm were, at the time, approximately £750,000 (US$3 million); this is the equivalent of around A$45 million in modern figures. The supercell dropped hailstones larger than 8 centimetres (3.1 in) in diameter, with the most significant damage occurring in the central business district and eastern suburbs of Sydney.

The event caused around 1000 injuries, with between 200 and 350 people requiring hospitalisation or other medical attention, predominantly caused by broken glass shards. The majority of severe injuries reported were suffered by people on Sydney's beaches, where many were without shelter. The size of the hailstones were the largest seen in Sydney for 52 years, until the 1999 Sydney hailstorm caused A$1.7 billion in insured damage in becoming the costliest natural disaster in Australian history.

== Conditions and climatology ==
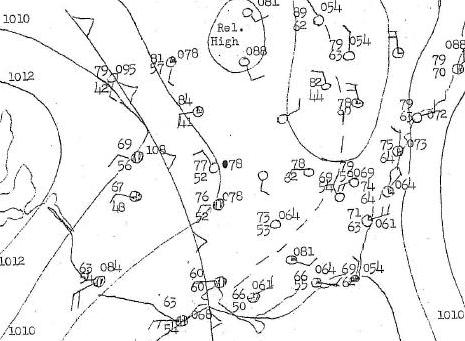
The barometric map for 9:00 am, from Newman's Bureau of Meteorology report of the storm.

During the spring and summer, conditions along the east coast of Australia are highly conducive for the formation of hailstorms. The variation of air temperature in the atmosphere; with warm and humid air close to the ground and colder air above it causes instability, and the cold upper atmosphere temperatures allow the precipitation to fall in solid form as hailstones. Since records began in 1791, hailstorms in the month of January form approximately 13% of the total number of hailstorms in the Sydney metropolitan area, and over 15% of all events with 'large hail'.

Hailstorms have a history of significant damage in Australia. Since records on insured losses began in 1967, four hailstorms—Sydney in 1986, 1990 and 1999, as well as Brisbane in 1985—have featured on the top ten list of most insured damages caused by a single Australian natural disaster. Hailstorms caused more than 30% of all insured damages inflicted as a result of natural disasters in Australia during this period, and around three quarters of all hailstorm damage has occurred in New South Wales.

The conditions on New Year's Day, 1947 were meteorologically sound for the formation of a storm. The day was hot and humid, with the maximum temperature recorded during the day being 32.7 °C (90.9 °F) and humidity reaching 73%. Many Sydneysiders travelled to the beaches along the coastline to benefit from the afternoon sea breeze. The general weather pattern for Sydney in summer is movement from the west to the east—from over the Blue Mountains to across the city and into the Tasman Sea.

== Progression of the storm ==
Path of the centre of the storm over the Sydney metropolitan region.

Developing from the Blue Mountains to the south-west of Sydney in the morning of 1 January 1947, the storm cell was first identified at 10:00 am by weather observers at Mascot. The formation of storms in this region is not unusual, especially given the hot and humid conditions at ground level which causes atmospheric instability. However, the Bureau of Meteorology reported that the formation of the storm was different from most others, describing how "the underpart of the cloud was mottled and serrated or curtained, rather than mammilated, and looked angry black, while false cirrus tufts were discernible at the top".

The storm cell dropped hailstones the size of billiard balls across the south-western suburbs of Sydney. It moved directly over Liverpool at 2:25 pm, heading in a north-east direction before slowly bending its path and travelling almost due east as it passed over the southern part of the central business district. "Large explosion-like sounds", presumed to be thunder by the Bureau, were heard around the Sydney Harbour Bridge. The sounds were described by the Bureau—who were based at Observatory Hill, next to the southwest pylon of the Bridge, in 1947—as a "terrific noise" akin to "several trains ... passing over [the Bridge]".

The storm intensified as it cut through the suburbs, and eventually unleashed its full power across the eastern suburbs of Sydney. The suburbs most seriously affected were Surry Hills, south of the central district, as well as Bondi and Rose Bay in the Waverley region which were struck at around 2:40 pm. The hailstorm pelted beach-goers, particularly at Bondi Beach, and the situation was described by a World War II veteran as "though [he] was back in the firing line overseas". The hail in the coastal regions was described as being of similar size to a cricket ball.

== Aftermath ==
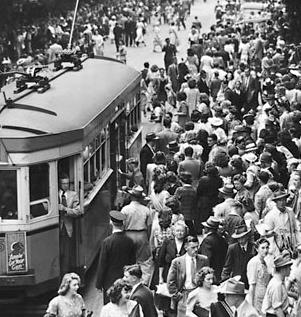
The trams on the eastern suburbs route, from Central station to Circular Quay via Pitt Street, suffered damage from the hail.

The most damage was caused when the storm was its most intense, over the eastern suburbs of the city. According to the Bureau of Meteorology, over 5,000 roofs were damaged in Waverley by the lumps of hail which weighed up to 1.8 kg (4.0 lb). No official cost total exists for the amount of damage caused by the 1947 hailstorm, however a Reuters article published in The New York Times on 2 January estimated preliminary damage to be worth around US$3 million, equivalent to £750,000. This is approximately equal to A$45 million in modern figures, placing it well below the costliest natural disasters in Australian history; this, given the severity of the storm cell, is attributable mainly to the relative inexpensiveness of buildings and other items of the era. More definite historical accounts exist for damage caused to certain buildings. The historic skylight which runs through the centre of the main Central railway station building was smashed, and the shards reportedly fell in sizes up to 26 cm^{2} (4 sq in) on around 100 waiting passengers.

Convertible cars, in fashion at the time of the storm, also sustained severe damage, mainly punctures to the soft-top roofs, and trams that ran through the eastern suburbs at the time also suffered damage. According to veteran meteorologist Richard Whitaker, "Sydney was staggered by the enormity of the incident, as there had not been even a remotely similar storm in living memory". The problems were exacerbated due to a lack of building materials available for use in repair work, a result of World War II which had concluded only 18 months prior. This contributed to the delays which resulted in houses still covered with only temporary tarpaulins several years later.

Most of the approximately 1000 injuries were caused by the hailstones directly striking people or from flying debris, with the latter mainly from shattered windows. Of these, between 200 and 350 people required hospitalisation or other medical attention, however figures vary between different sources. The storm struck during the afternoon of a public holiday—New Year's Day—which produced hot and humid conditions, and the beaches in the eastern suburbs were significantly populated. The beach-goers were exposed to the large hail when the storm cell reached the coastline, and according to the front-page report in the Sydney Morning Herald the following day, "[f]or nearly three hours, ambulance wagons travelled from the eastern suburbs beaches with the injured". The 8 cm (3.1 in) hailstones which fell during the 1947 event were not matched in Sydney for 52 years, until the 1999 hailstorm, which caused A$1.7 billion in insured damage—the costliest natural disaster in Australian history.

== See also ==
- Severe storms in Australia
- Emergency management
