= 1971 Canberra flood =

Flash flood in Canberra, Australia

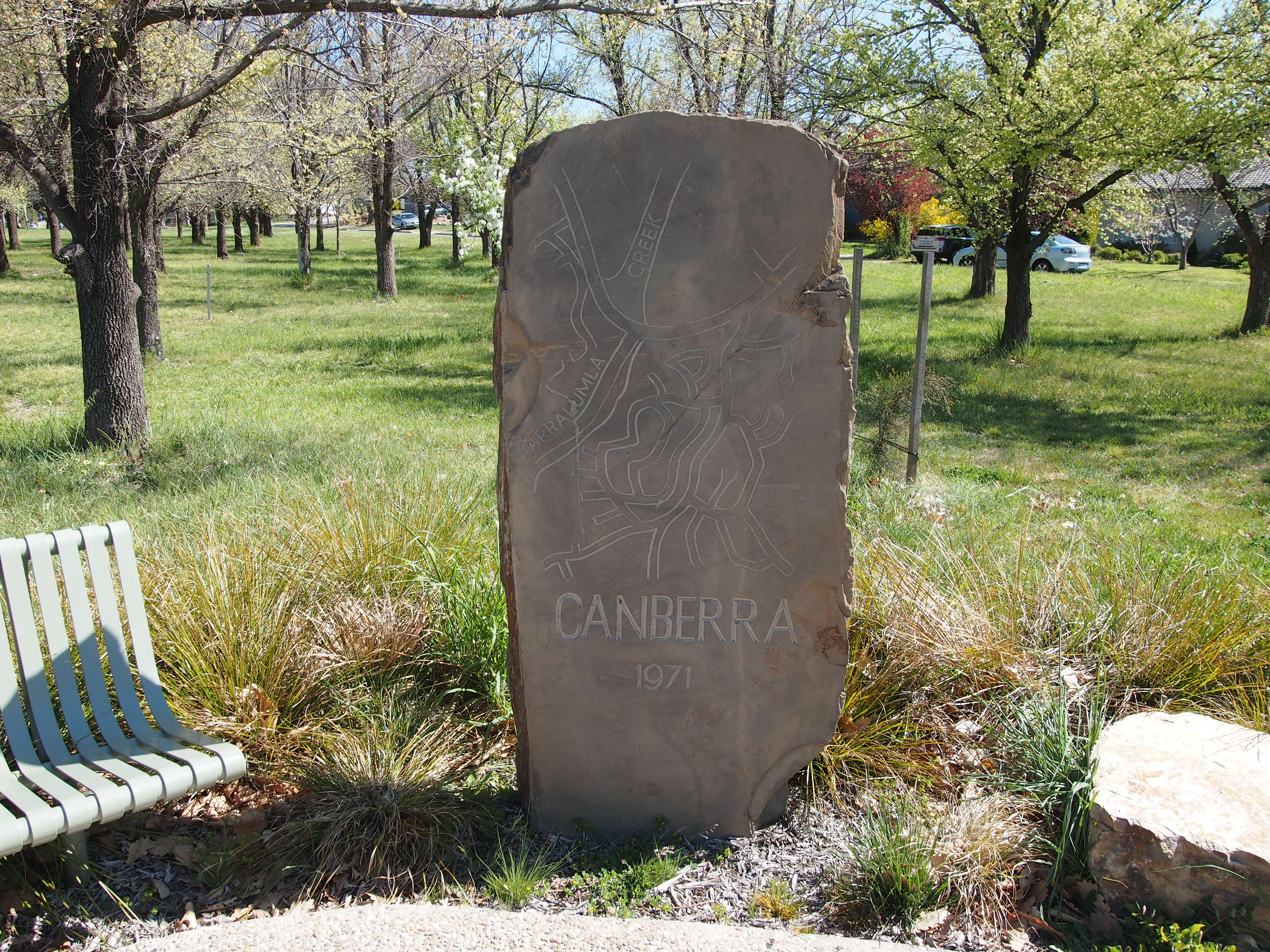
Part of the memorial to the victims of the flood

The 1971 Canberra flood was a flash flood that occurred on 26 January 1971, in the Woden Valley district of Canberra, Australia.

== Canberra flood ==
The flood killed seven people including four children, injured 15 and affected 500 people. The insurance damage was estimated at A$9 million. It was estimated that around 95 mm of rain fell in one hour during this event. The Yarralumla Creek drainage channel peak rate of flow measured 186,891 litres per second at the Carruthers Street pluviograph near Yarra Glen at around 8:50pm.

The force of the water was strong enough to turn a bus 180 degrees on Melrose Drive south east of the intersection with Yarra Glen. The intersection was covered to a depth of an estimated 1.83 m and the floodwaters spread an estimated 183 m wide, east to west across the intersection of Yamba Drive, Melrose Drive and Yarra Glen. A number of people and cars were swept into the Yarralumla Creek drainage channel from a low level crossing at the junction of Yamba Drive, Melrose Drive and Yarra Glen.

Yamba Drive was covered in fast flowing water to at least 275 m south of the Hindmarsh Drive intersection where a white car and the driver were swept into the Long Gully drainage channel.

== Victims ==
The 1971 Canberra flood victims names and ages:

- Carmel Anne Smith (19)
- Margaret Mary Smith (15)
- Michael John Smith (6)
- Jennifer Ann Seymour (12)
- Dianne Elizabeth Seymour (8)
- Lon Victor Cumberland (18)
- Roderick Dumaresq Simon (20)

== Aftermath ==
One Australian Police Officer, Constable Jeff Brown, was six months later awarded the British Empire Medal for Gallantry for rescue efforts during the event. Four Australian Police Officers were later awarded the Queen's Commendation for Brave Conduct for rescue efforts during the event.

Following the flood seven crosses were erected near the side of the road to mark the victims. A permanent memorial was officially dedicated on 26 January 2010.

The "pods" of the Callam Offices in the Woden Town Centre are suspended above the Yarralumla Creek floodplain, as they were commissioned following the flood.

== See also ==
- Severe storms in Australia
- List of disasters in Australia by death toll
