= 1999 Sydney hailstorm =

Natural disaster in Australia

Coordinates: 33°52′2″S 151°12′27″E

- Radar image showing the main storm (top) and a smaller secondary storm (bottom).

Meteorological history
- Formed: 14 April 1999, 4:25 pm AEST (UTC+10:00); North of Nowra
- Dissipated: 14 April 1999, 10:00 pm AEST (UTC+10:00); East of Gosford, offshore
- Duration: 5 hours, 35 minutes

Overall effects
- Fatalities: 1 (lightning)
- Injuries: 50
- Damage: Insured: A$1.7 billion (1999); Estimated total: A$2.3 billion (1999)
- Areas affected: Eastern suburbs and central business district, New South Wales

On the afternoon 14 April 1999, a powerful hailstorm formed north of Nowra and moved north toward the city of Sydney in New South Wales, Australia. It was the costliest natural disaster in Australian insurance history, causing extensive damage along the east coast of New South Wales. The storm struck the city's eastern suburbs, including the central business district, later that evening.

The storm dropped an estimated 500,000 tonnes of hailstones in its path. The insured damage bill caused by the storm was over A$1.7 billion, which is equivalent to A$3.2 billion in 2022 when adjusted for inflation, with the total bill (including uninsured damage) estimated to be around A$2.3 billion, or A$4.3 billion in 2022. It was the costliest single natural disaster in Australian history in insured damage, surpassing the A$1.1 billion in insured damage caused by the 1989 Newcastle earthquake. Lightning killed one person during the storm, and the event caused approximately 50 injuries.

The storm was classified as a supercell following further analysis of its erratic nature and extreme attributes. During the event, the Bureau of Meteorology was constantly surprised by the frequent changes in direction, as well as the severity of the hail and the duration of the storm. The event was also surprising as neither the time of year, time of day, nor the general meteorological conditions in the region were seen as conducive to extreme storm cell formation.

== Conditions and climatology ==
The conditions around Sydney on Wednesday, 14 April 1999 were calm, although a slight instability in atmospheric conditions was recorded by the Bureau of Meteorology in the region. Two instability events had been identified in the greater Sydney area, but both were considered minor by the meteorological agencies. A weak cold front was moving north along the coast, and moderate precipitation was falling over the Blue Mountains, southwest of the city. The meteorological reports and figures, however, suggested that the general atmospheric conditions were "not conducive" to support the formation of a major thunderstorm in the region.

Historical records show that the formation of severe thunderstorms for the time of day and year had been rare, and it was improbable that they would maintain their intensity and cause significant damage. This long-standing belief contributed to the Bureau of Meteorology's decision not to issue warnings in the early part of the storm's development. This event was only the second time in recorded history that hail larger than 2 cm (0.8 in) had fallen in the Sydney metropolitan area in the month of April, and only the fifth hailstorm to strike Sydney during April in the 200 years of meteorological records for the city.

Hailstorms have had a history of significant damage in Australia. Since records on insured losses by the Insurance Disaster Response Organisation began in 1967, three other hailstorms – Sydney in 1986 and 1990, as well as Brisbane in 1985 – feature on the top-ten list of most insured damage caused by a single natural disaster, in addition to the 1999 storm. Hailstorms have caused more than 30% of all insured damage inflicted as a result of natural disasters in Australia during this period, and around three-quarters of all hailstorm damage has occurred in New South Wales.

== Progression of the storm ==
=== Formation and southern Sydney ===
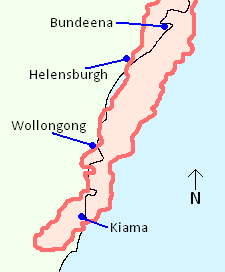
Path of the storm from formation and in the southern regions of Sydney

The storm cell formed at 4:25 pm AEST to the north of Nowra, roughly 115 km (71 mi) south-southwest of Sydney. After forming, it initially headed towards the coast in a northeasterly direction. The cell passed just to the west of Kiama at around 5:15 pm and gained a 'severe' classification from the Bureau of Meteorology at the same time. 'Severe' is a classification used by the Bureau of Meteorology for thunderstorms which meet a specific criteria, namely producing hailstones with a diameter of 2 cm (0.8 in) or more, wind gusts of 90 km/h (56 mph) or greater and flash flooding, or tornadoes. This classification is also used by the Bureau to classify the attributes of a storm at any given time during its life.

The storm continued to move in a northeasterly direction, crossing the coast just north of Kiama at 5:25 pm. It was downgraded from a severe thunderstorm and proceeded to move further off the coast for another 15 minutes while gaining speed to around 37 km/h (23 mph). The storm then veered northward at 5:40 pm and continued parallel to the coast. Around 6:00 pm, directly east of Wollongong, the storm changed direction again, this time to north-northeast, and continued parallel to the coastline. Moderate hailstones were recorded falling in Wollongong as the western edge of the storm passed over the area, and the storm was reclassified as severe.

The storm moved parallel to the coast in a north-northeasterly direction for the next fifty minutes. It maintained a severe classification though did not impact heavily on the coastal suburbs, because it was entirely offshore. The western edge of the storm, however, recrossed the coastline just east of Helensburgh, 40 km (25 mi) south-southwest of Sydney, at about 7:00 pm. Ten minutes later the direction of the storm veered slightly more northward and the centre of the storm crossed back onto land at Bundeena at around 7:20 pm.

=== Immediate Sydney region ===
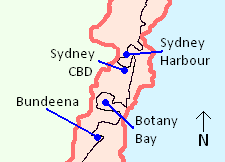
Path of the storm over the eastern suburbs area of Sydney

The Bureau of Meteorology had not issued warnings for Sydney Airport, located on the northern shore of Botany Bay, or the rest of the eastern suburbs to prepare for large hail. They were not expecting the storm to veer northward again, but rather to continue to head further out into the Tasman Sea in a consistent north-northeasterly direction.

After crossing the coast, the storm continued to move northward, crossing Botany Bay at 7:40 pm and reaching the Airport five minutes later. It travelled across the eastern suburbs between Botany Bay and Sydney Harbour between 7:45 pm and 8:05 pm, dropping massive hailstones on both houses and businesses in the eastern suburbs district and the central business district. Some of the largest hailstones ever recorded in the Sydney region fell on the eastern suburbs during this storm. There were reports of 13 cm (5.1 in) diameter hailstones in the eastern suburbs, although the largest confirmed hailstone was 9 cm (3.5 in) in diameter. It was the first time in 52 years that stones greater than 8 cm (3.1 in) had fallen in Sydney, with the last reported event being the 1947 hailstorm.

The storm continued across Sydney Harbour and changed direction slightly to be heading north. It weakened after travelling over the harbour, and was downgraded from a severe storm at 8:15 pm. The Bureau of Meteorology had concluded that the storm would weaken after heading across Sydney Harbour, believing it was dissipating and would therefore not produce any more substantial hail as it moved northward; therefore it did not issue warnings for the northern suburbs.

=== Northern suburbs and dissipation ===
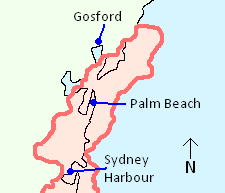
Path of the storm after crossing Sydney Harbour until dissipating

The storm then continued north for twenty minutes over the North Shore suburbs of Sydney before regaining strength and veering north-northwest again, redeveloping severe thunderstorm characteristics. The storm's redevelopment again caught the Bureau of Meteorology off-guard, who had expected the storm to dissipate and move out to sea without causing further substantial damage.

It proceeded to drop large amounts of hail on the northern beach suburbs of Mona Vale and Palm Beach around 8:50 pm, and the centre of the storm again crossed the coast and back out to sea just after 9:00 pm. The storm maintained its intensity, however, and continued to move in a northwesterly direction across Broken Bay. The western edge of the storm had a minor impact on southern suburbs of the Central Coast between 9:15 pm and 9:30 pm.

The storm moved entirely off the coastline and into open water at around 9:45 pm. It then dissipated rapidly around 9:55 pm, directly east of Gosford. It was subsequently downgraded from severe status and the storm cell had faded completely by 10:00 pm.

== Aftermath ==
=== Secondary storm cell ===
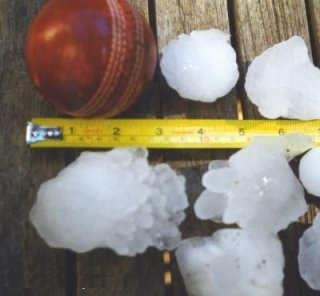
Hailstones dropped during the storm, compared to a cricket ball (7 cm or 2.8 in diameter)

A second, far smaller storm cell passed along a similar route to the first later in the evening of 14 April. This cell was never given the classification of 'severe' by the Bureau of Meteorology, nor did it develop into a supercell like its predecessor. Therefore, the route of the second cell was more direct and predictable than the first, following the general movement of the cold front (see conditions and climatology), and the Bureau of Meteorology issued warnings to all residents in the second cell's projected path to expect further storm activity.

The secondary cell passed through Sydney two hours later than the first, just after 10:00 pm, having been approximately 80 km (50 mi) south of Sydney when the supercell struck. It dropped hail up to 2 cm (0.8 in) in diameter, as well as producing heavy rainfall. Damage caused by the second cell was mostly due to rain coming in through roofs already damaged by hail from the first cell. Hail from the second cell also contributed to the damage.

=== Damage caused ===
The downpour of an estimated 500,000 tonnes of hail across Sydney suburbia resulted in widespread damage on the coastal suburbs in its path. Insured losses due to the disaster reached roughly A$1.7 billion, with total costs estimated to be around A$2.3 billion. The storm was the costliest natural disaster ever to hit Australia in terms of insured losses, surpassing the 1989 Newcastle earthquake by around A$600 million. The areas that incurred the most damage were between Lilli Pilli and Darling Point, located 25 km (16 mi) apart on the coastline of Sydney.

The vast majority of damage was done by hail and rain. Approximately 24,000 houses were significantly damaged, with many suffering water damage through the holes in roofs that the large hailstones created. The stones were estimated as travelling at up to 200 km/h (120 mph) in some periods of the storm, causing indentation damage to around 70,000 vehicles. Twenty-three aeroplanes and helicopters at Sydney Airport were reported as having been damaged by the hail, caused by the inability to place them under hangars in time to avoid the storm. This has been significantly attributed to a lack of warnings from the Bureau of Meteorology, who had expected the storm to continue moving further out into the Tasman Sea in the north-northeasterly direction in which it had previously been travelling.

The most significant insurance costs were in the areas of residential property damage with 31.8% of total payments, motor vehicle damage with 28.6% and for properties which service the commercial and industrial sectors at 27.5%. Damage to aviation property, mainly planes at the vulnerable Sydney Airport, amounted to 5.9% of the claims, while 5.8% of all insurance payments were made for 'business interruption' and 0.4% for damage to boats as well as other miscellaneous claims.

The storm caused one fatality; a 45-year-old man, who was fishing about 100 metres (300 ft) from the north shore of Dolans Bay in the Port Hacking estuary, was killed when his boat was struck by lightning. Fifty injuries were recorded, caused by flying objects, road accidents due to poor visibility and smashed windscreens and other factors.

=== Emergency response ===
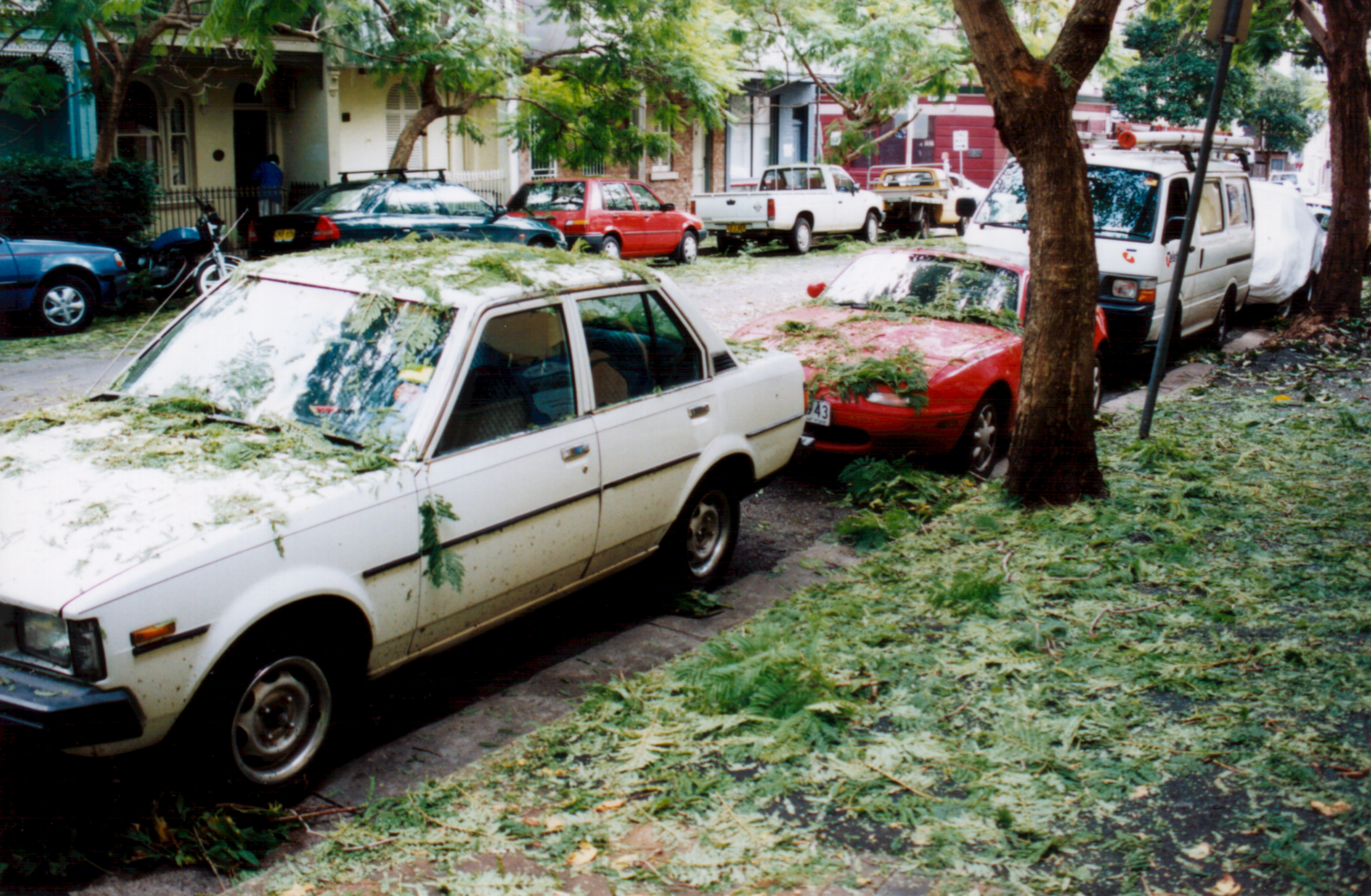
The aftermath of the storm, Darlinghurst, inner-city Sydney

Owing to the magnitude of the storm, the State Emergency Service were aided by the New South Wales Rural Fire Service, the New South Wales Fire Brigades and the Australian Capital Territory Emergency Service in recovery work. Within hours of the storm striking the city, all affected areas were declared as 'disaster zones' and the New South Wales Government, under Premier Bob Carr, invoked a state of emergency, which gave control and co-ordination of the response to the State Emergency Service. In the days following the storm, John Moore (Minister for Defence) approved a request for 300 Australian Defence Force personnel to assist recovery operations, although their assistance was only for one week while resources were stretched. The government, one week later, "unexpectedly" removed complete control from the State Emergency Service and placed certain suburbs and areas under the control of the Rural Fire Service and Fire Brigade.

In the five hours following the storm striking Sydney, the State Emergency Service received 2,000 emergency calls to 1,092 separate incidents. In total, the State Emergency Service received 25,301 calls for assistance to 15,007 incidents, with the New South Wales Rural Fire Service also receiving 19,437. The recovery and clean-up mission used an estimated A$10 million worth of tarpaulin covers while waiting for permanent repairs.

After nine days, approximately 3,000 buildings (out of a total of 127,947 initially damaged) were still waiting for assistance and temporary fixes to shattered roofs and windows, while a similar number still required assistance a further week later (as a number of tarpaulins became detached or otherwise ineffective). One month after the disaster, the main priority of the emergency services was ensuring that temporary fixes remained in place, as Sydney suffered further adverse weather in the period immediately following the storm.

A study of samples taken of affected areas suggested that roughly 62% of buildings in the affected areas suffered damage to roofs, around 34% to windows and 53% to vehicles. Construction of infrastructure for the 2000 Sydney Olympics in the city's west at the time meant there was a deficiency of tradespeople who could be contracted to repair roofs and windows. Estimates put between 45,000 and 50,000 tradespeople in Sydney at the time of the storm, yet owing to high demand "companies were quoting householders A$14,000 or more for roof repairs which would normally cost A$3,000." The situation led to a warning from the Minister for Fair Trade, John Watkins, on the day following the storm, urging homeowners to ensure that tradespeople working to repair homes were fully qualified and legitimate.

== See also ==
- Emergency management
- List of disasters in Australia by death toll
- Severe storms in Australia
- Severe storm events in Sydney
