= Severe storms in Australia =

Major weather events

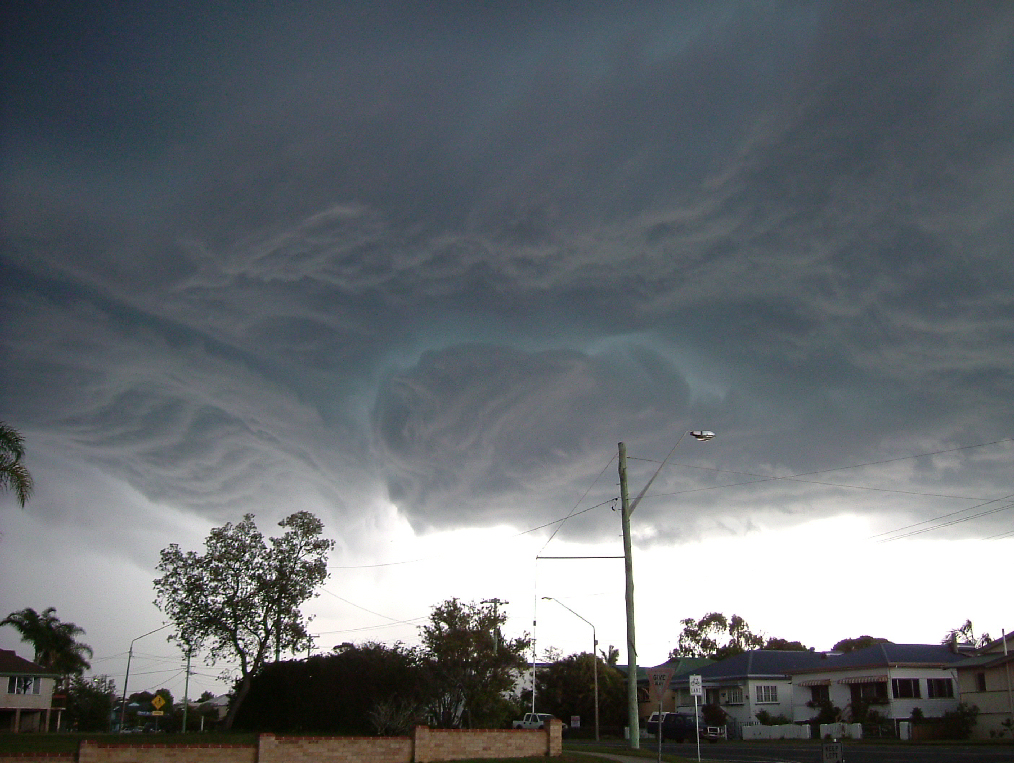
Hail storm clouds above Brunswick Heads, 2007

Severe storms in Australia refers to the storms, including cyclones, which have caused severe damage in Australia.

== Australian Capital Territory ==
=== 1971 ===
On 26 January 1971 a severe storm caused flash-flooding on the Woden Valley freeway when culverts became blocked with debris at either end. Several cars were swept from the road into the rushing water. Seven people were killed, 15 were injured, and 500 people were affected by the 1971 Canberra flood. Insurance damage was estimated at $9 million (1971 dollars). Significant rectification work was undertaken at the Yarra Glen arterial roadway.

=== 1990s ===
Five people were injured in the suburb of Chisholm in 1990 by a tornado which destroyed a wooden church and damaged 37 houses.

27,000 people were affected across the territory by a severe storm in November 1996.

=== 2005 and 2006 ===
There were heavy storms (and a possible tornado) which hit Canberra, and the surrounding New South Wales region, on 2 December 2005. The storms were the worst emergency to hit Canberra since the 2003 Canberra bushfires. The storms caused much damage to houses and property, and one man was killed by a falling tree in the suburb of Curtin. The storm hit Canberra at about 4.30 pm, and moved south-eastwards across the city. There were 51 Canberra suburbs which reported damage during the storm, the most extensive being in Fyshwick estimated to be A$3–4 million in damage. The ACT Emergency Services received about 200 calls for help during the storm, with the NSW SES getting more than 500 calls. Calvary Hospital, and thousands of houses lost power, with ACTEW saying that about 5% of the network had been affected. Calvary utilised a generator until power was restored. The storm was rated as one of the biggest ever to hit the ACT, with an estimated A$15 million in damages across the city.

On 31 December 2006 a huge thunderstorm, the third in three days, caused havoc in the southern part of Canberra – inner suburbs and Tuggeranong.

=== 2007 ===
On 27 February 2007 a supercell storm hit Canberra City, with hail covering the ground to a depth of 20 centimetres (7.9 in) and creating 1 metre (3 ft 3 in) high hail drifts in Civic. The ice was so heavy, a newly built roof of the newly constructed shopping centre collapsed. Birds were killed by hail produced from the supercell (Northbourne Avenue), and people were stranded.

The following day (28 February) many homes in Canberra were subjected to flash flooding, caused either by the inability of storm water infrastructure to cope, or through mud slides from cleared land. As reported by the Bureau of Meteorology, February 2007 had a record number of thunderstorms.

November to February is traditionally the thunderstorm season in the ACT.

=== 2020 ===
On the afternoon of 20 January 2020 a short but severe storm struck Canberra and nearby Queanbeyan in NSW. Hailstones as large as golf-balls and winds over 110 kilometres per hour (68 mph) were noted. Many thousands of motor vehicles were badly damaged by hail and many were written off. Over 50,000 insurance claims were lodged, largely for vehicles, and the event was declared a catastrophe by the National Insurance Council. The cost of the storm was over A$500,000,000. Power to about 1,000 homes was cut. Sixty-five Commonwealth Scientific and Industrial Research Organisation (CSIRO) experimental greenhouses were severely damaged by hail, and as consequence years of crop, and other types of research, were lost. The Australian Academy of Science's Shine Dome was seriously damaged, with smashed skylights and denting of the copper roof surface. Large numbers of fauna were killed and trees were also damaged.

=== 2022 ===
On the evening of Monday 3 January 2022, a power supercell thunderstorm impacted Canberra. It began to move through Tuggeranong, which prompted the Bureau of Meteorology to issue a Severe Thunderstorm Warning for Damaging Winds, Heavy Rainfall and Large Hailstones. The storm underwent further intensification as it moved over Canberra and hit Belconnen at peak strength. As the storm moved over West Belconnen, the Bureau of Meteorology updated their Severe Thunderstorm Warning to include Giant Hailstones.

The storm reportedly produced hailstones the size of golf balls. Many trees and powerlines were also brought down, causing 17,000 people to be without power. Flash flooding was also reported in various suburbs.

The ACT SES received over 800 calls for help, with teams from NSW SES brought in to assist with clean up efforts.

It took up to seven days before power was fully restored to some parts of Canberra, such as Scullin.

The storm event and emergency services response to it was the subject of a formal Inquiry by the Australian Capital Territory Legislative Assembly, Standing Committee on Health and Community Wellbeing.

== New South Wales ==
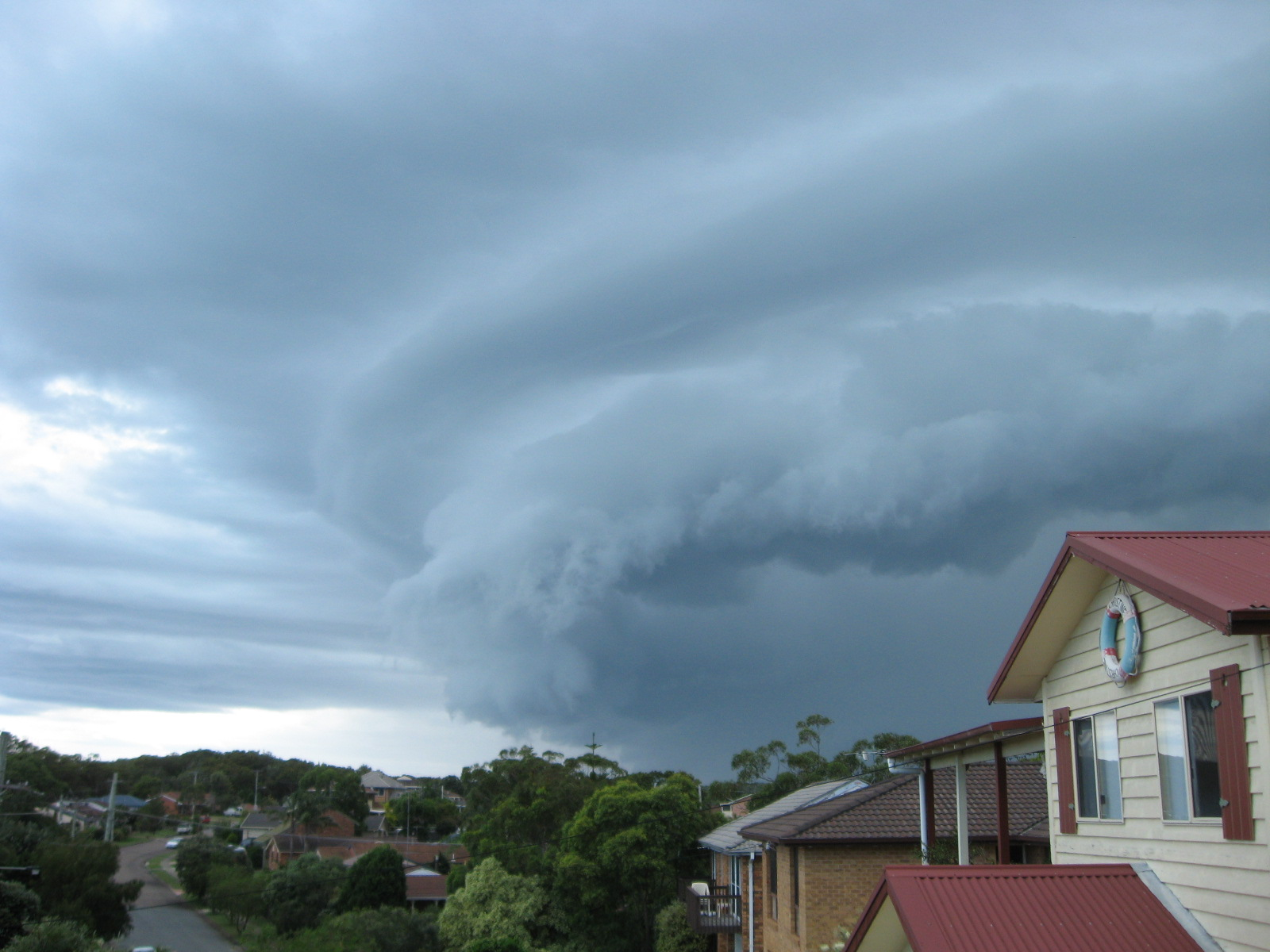
A storm approaches Anna Bay in 2008

=== 1947 ===
The 1947 Sydney hailstorm was a natural disaster which struck Sydney on 1 January 1947. The storm cell developed on the morning of New Year's Day, a public holiday in Australia, over the Blue Mountains, hitting the city and dissipating east of Bondi Beach in the mid-afternoon. At the time, it was the most severe storm to strike the city since recorded observations began in 1792.

=== 1991 ===
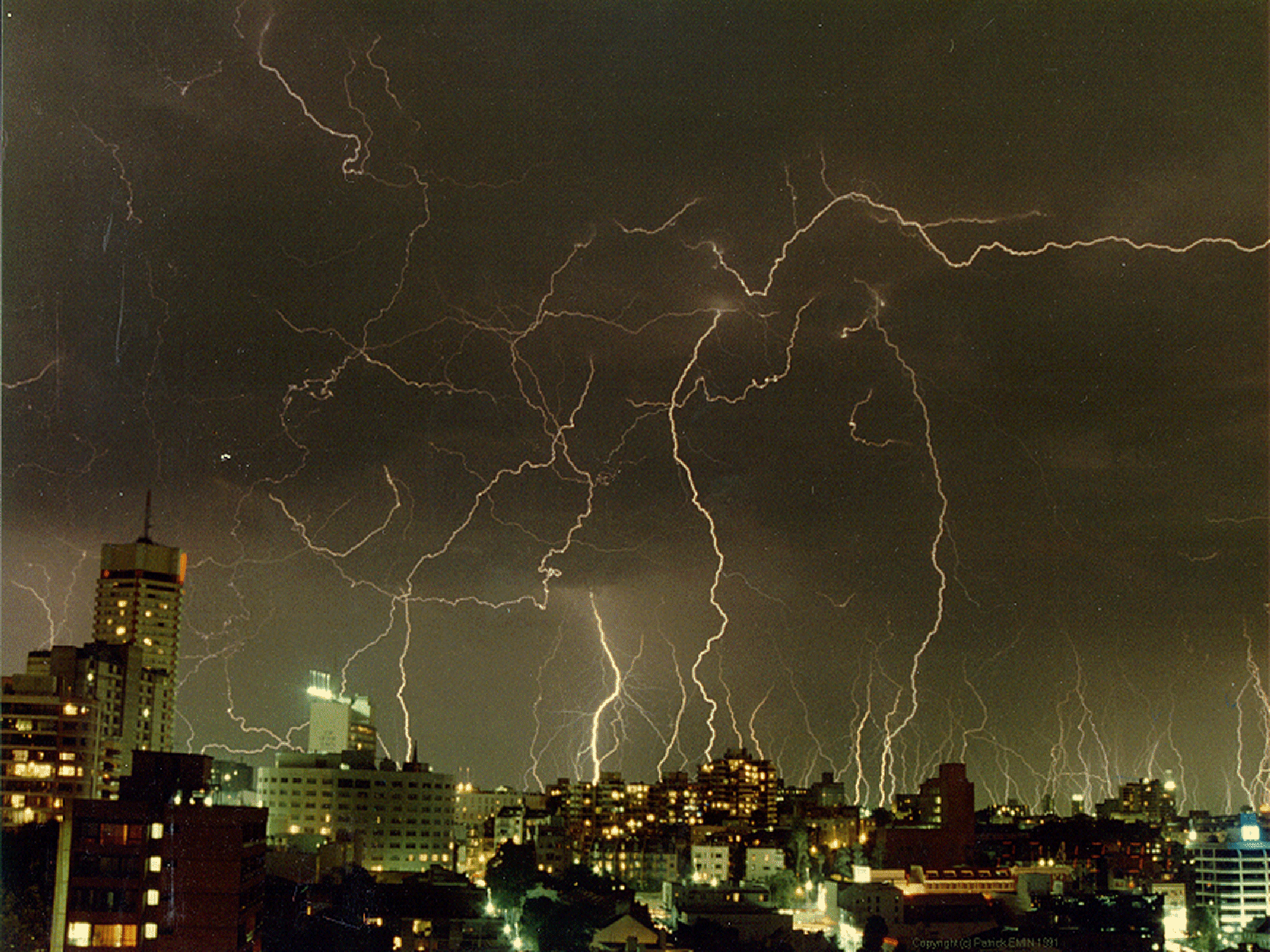
Thunderstorm over Sydney in 1991.

On 21 January 1991, supercell thunderstorms moved across the Northern Suburbs of Sydney during the afternoon. Strong winds and large hail stones caused extensive damage. Hail stones up to 7 centimetres (2.8 in) in diameter and flash flooding was reported in several locations. Some areas received more than 35 millimetres (1.4 in) of rain in 6 minutes and more than 60 millimetres (2.4 in) in half an hour. Areas of most severe damage stretched from the Warrawee–Turramurra area to Duffys Forest, with significant damage occurring to property in the Ku-ring-gai, Hornsby and former Warringah council areas. More than 7,000 houses were damaged. The total estimated insurance payout for the storm was estimated at A$215 million.

=== 1999 ===
Australia's most costly natural disaster in dollar terms, as of 1999, was a severe hail storm over Sydney on 14 April 1999. Hail up to almost the size of cricket balls – 8 to 9 centimetres (3.1 to 3.5 in) circumference – fell in a damage path that extended from Bundeena in the south to Darling Point in the north, and from Sydenham in the Inner West to Bondi Junction in the east. In total, over 20,000 properties and 40,000 vehicles were damaged during the storm with more than 25 aircraft damaged at Sydney Airport.

=== 2001–2005 ===
A severe storm in the Hunter Region, Sydney and central western regions killed three and injured 50, over a 4-day period in November 2001. A widespread storm across the Southern Eastern States on 1–2 February 2005, killed three and injured 12, with the damage bill estimated at $216.7 million.

A Piper Chieftain light aircraft crashed west of Condobolin in December 2005 during storms killing Peter Menegazzo, one of Australia's biggest landowners, and his wife.

=== 2007 ===
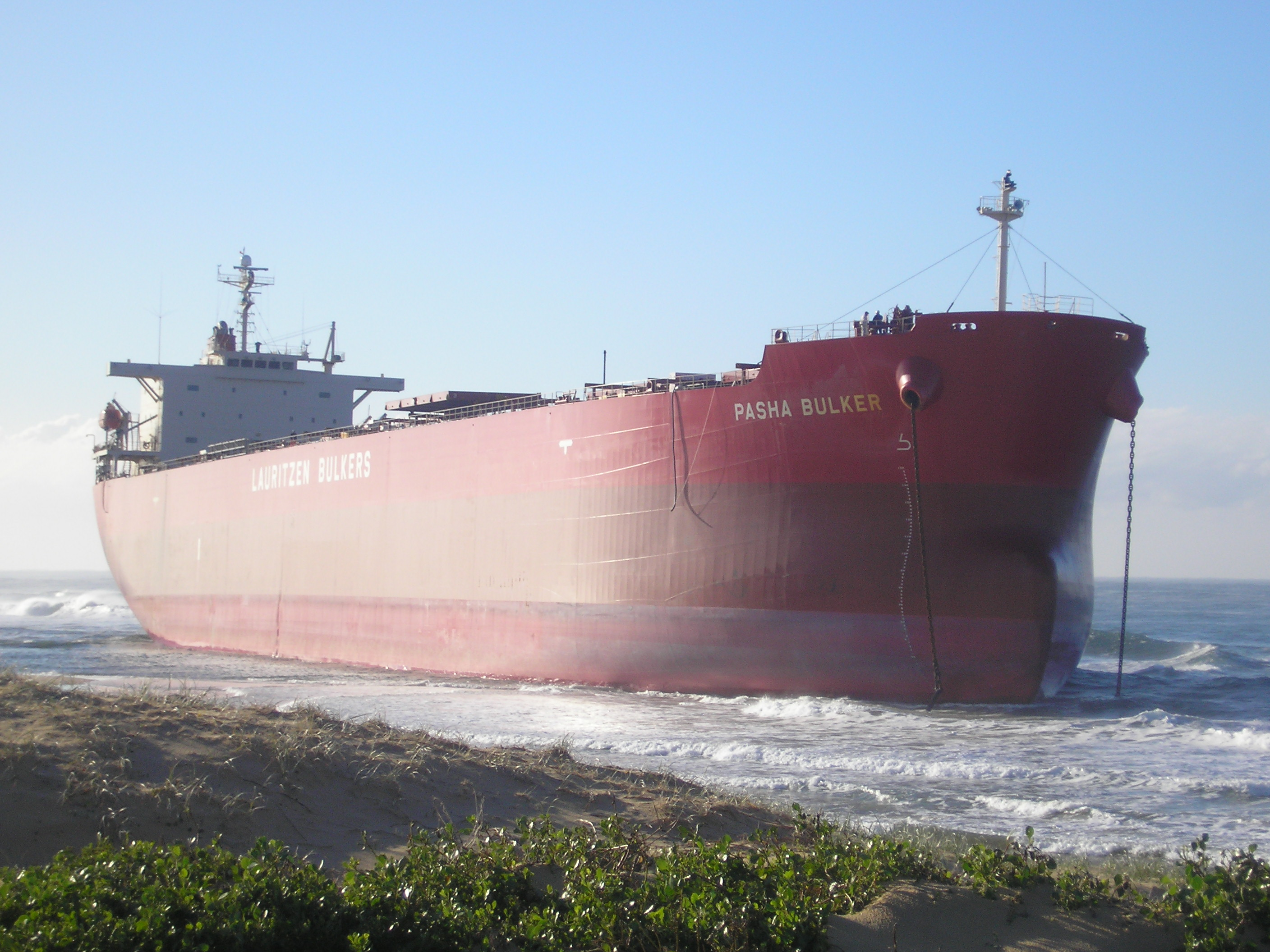
The Pasha Bulker ran aground on 8 June 2007

A major storm in early June 2007 known as an east coast low caused major disruption in the Hunter Region, Central Coast and Sydney killing 9 people. During the days following it also caused extensive damage and major flooding in the lower-Hunter River region, including Maitland, and flash flooding in other parts of the region. Electricity supplies were extensively damaged. The resultant swell from the storm on 8 June caused the bulk carrier, Pasha Bulker, to run aground off Newcastle's Nobbys Beach.

A few months later in October, a tornadic super-cell thunderstorm hit the region surrounding Lismore twice in one month. The first storm with giant hailstones the size of tennis balls hit Lismore on 8 October causing chaos in the CBD. Extensive damage was caused in central Lismore from large hail and strong winds. More than 17 people were injured by hail or flying glass from smashed windows. Over 1,000 claims were received by the NRMA, mostly for damaged motor vehicles, broken windows, skylights and roof tiles. Nearly 300 calls for assistance were received by the State Emergency Service. Many buildings were damaged including City Hall, the police station, ambulance station, hospital and other council buildings and small businesses. City Hall had massive damage on western side and had partly collapsed. The roof of the Gymnastics Centre had partly collapsed due to weight of hail and water. Damage bill estimated at $60 million with Lismore declared a natural disaster area.

South Lismore was hit by another severe storm the following day on 9 October causing even more damage than the day before. Hail 6 cm size and strong winds estimated at 100 km/h caused widespread damage. About 20mm rain fell in 10 minutes. Windows were smashed with hail inside houses. People were injured, cars damaged and trees uprooted with flash flooding and power outages.

Three weeks later, another storm caused chaos in the small town of Dunoon. More than 20 houses lost their roofs with some partly demolished, including the local church, as tornadic winds swept through the centre of town. Trees were snapped off or uprooted, power lines brought down and gardens flattened. Large hail was reported. The local sub-station exploded after being hit by flying debris, causing power outages. The Lismore district was declared a natural disaster area for the second time this month with the damage bill at Dunoon estimated at $5 million. On the same day, large hail and strong winds caused damage exceeding $1 million in Grafton, Byron Bay and Mullumbimby.

=== 2010 ===
Beginning on the evening of 12 February 2010, some regions of Sydney were inundated by strong rain and localised flash flooding caused by a Black nor'easter. The storms produced some of the highest rainfalls seen in the area over a decade, with 88 millimetres (3.5 in) recorded in Hornsby and 73 millimetres (2.9 in) in Mona Vale over just one hour. The storms continued through to 14 February, with a maximum daily rainfall for the year of 332 millimetres (13.1 in) recorded at Tuross Head. Some areas of the northwest and southeast were declared natural disaster zones. The State Emergency Service received over 1,500 distress calls, with damages exceeding A$6 million in western regions.

=== 2011–2012 ===
Throughout summer 2011–2012 Sydney experienced above average rainfall, with many cases of flash flooding, and rivers breaking their banks due to sustained rain periods. On 8 March one of the more widespread flash flooding events occurred disrupting the daily commute, by flooding train stations, and arterial roads.

=== 2015 ===
From 20 to 22 April 2015, the Hunter, Central Coast and Sydney regions experienced severe rain fall and 'cyclonic winds' gusting from 100 to 135 kilometres per hour (62 to 84 mph) from an east coast low resulting in many cases of flash flooding, and rivers breaking their banks due to sustained rain periods. Over the course of the three days the Main Northern and Illawarra railway lines were closed at some point. Over 80 Department of Education and Communities (DEC) schools were closed across NSW on both 21 and 22 April due to safety concerns. The Newcastle and Hunter regions were hit worst by the storm and four people were killed in flash flooding, including three people in the Hunter township of Dungog. Between 100,000 and 200,000 homes and businesses were without power at some point during the three days.

On 16 December a tornadic supercell thunderstorm struck the east coast, with high rainfall, hailstones and unusually strong winds. Kurnell in southern Sydney was particularly hard hit with homes and businesses un-roofed, sewerage and electricity cut, two trucks tipped on their sides, and workers evacuated from Kurnell Refinery and the desalination plant, which was damaged. A "Wind gust of 213 kilometres per hour (132 mph) recorded in Kurnell at 10:33am," was "the fastest wind speed recorded in NSW history". Injuries to people were only minor. Roof damage also occurred at Westfield Bondi Junction and in South Nowra, Thousands of homes lost power in Bulli, Thirroul and Woonona north of Wollongong.

=== 2016 ===
The Hunter, Central Coast, Sydney, Illawarra, South Coast, Southern Tablelands and Snowy Mountains regions were impacted by severe rainfall between 4 and 6 January 2016. Peak rainfall over 24 hours included 255 millimetres (10.0 in) near Bulahdelah, including 80 millimetres (3.1 in) in one hour, 246 millimetres (9.7 in) at Newcastle, 239 millimetres (9.4 in) at Barrington Tops, 219 millimetres (8.6 in) at Williamtown, and more than 200 millimetres (7.9 in) near Moruya. Due to flooding of the Hunter River, the State Emergency Service issued an evacuation order for parts of Raymond Terrace.

The East Coast of Australia, including Brisbane, South East Queensland, far North NSW, the Northern Rivers and Sydney were battered by severe weather between 3 and 5 June 2016. Up to 200 millimetres (7.9 in) of rain fell across the entire coast, with 468 millimetres (18.4 in) falling in Wooli River Caravan Park near Grafton over 24 hours, and gusts of up to 125 km/h hitting Newcastle and Sydney. Flash flooding along the coast was recorded as a result of the storms. For the first time in over 30 years, a severe weather warning and flood watch was posted for the entire 2,000 km NSW Coast. More than 3,000 were received across NSW by 5 June, with 9,000 homes across Sydney and the Central Coast without power throughout Sunday. The deaths of four people across the coast were attributed to the severe storms. The system, stretching for nearly 3,000 km at its peak, was the result of two systems merging on Friday 3 June, developing into an East Coast Low.

=== 2020 ===
On 20 January 2020 a short but severe storm struck New South Wales and the Australian Capital Territory (ACT). Sydney, the Hunter Region, the Riverina and South Coast were all affected by the weather event. Roofs were blown off, trains were halted and people trapped in vehicles by fallen trees, and two persons were hit by lightning. Large hailstones and winds over 110 km/h were noted. Many thousands of motor vehicles were badly damaged by hail and many were written off. The event was declared a catastrophe by the National Insurance Council. The cost of the storm, in the ACT alone, was over A$500,000,000.

From 7–10 February, many areas on the east coast of New South Wales received heavy and continuous rain, the heaviest falls for thirty years. 391.6 millimetres (15.42 in) of rain fell over the four days in Sydney, more than three times the February average. Flooding was extensive, including areas, such as Lake Conjola, that had been devastated by bushfires about 6 weeks earlier. The rain did help extinguish many still burning bushfires, and greatly improved the levels of dams after years of drought. Power supply, trains, ferries and road transport were disrupted by flooding, fallen trees and washouts. Areas of the Northern Beaches, such as Collaroy, were damaged by waves more than 5 metres (16 ft) high.

=== 2021 ===
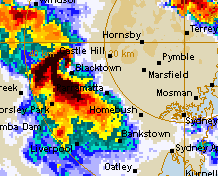
Radar image of the 2021 Sydney hailstorm at its peak intensity.

On 14 October 2021, multiple severe thunderstorm formed over the Blue Mountains and quickly moved east towards Sydney. One particular storm boasted an impressive hook echo on radar, and doppler winds indicates the presence of a broad mesocyclone. As a result, the Bureau of Meteorology issued a relatively rare tornado warning. Luckily, no tornado eventuated. The maximum recorded hail size was 6 cm, and the roof of a shopping mall collapsed in the suburb of Mount Druitt due to extremely heavy rainfall. 24mm of rainfall was recorded in the Penrith area in just 30 minutes. The supercell reached its peak intensity just west of Blacktown before weakening as it moved into a more stable atmosphere. It eventually moved out to sea at 6:19pm causing only minor damage near the coast.

== Northern Territory ==
Cyclone Tracy was a tropical cyclone that devastated Darwin, from 24 to 25 December 1974. It killed 65 people and destroyed over 90 percent of Darwin's buildings, leaving over 20,000 people homeless. Most of Darwin's population was evacuated to Adelaide, Whyalla, Alice Springs and Sydney, and many never returned to Darwin.

== Queensland ==
=== 1890s to 1950s ===
Tropical Cyclone Sigma caused destruction from Townsville to Brisbane between 24 and 27 January 1896. 18 people were killed, most of whom lost their lives when a storm surge caused a breach of the Ross River on 26 January, travelling 3 miles (4.8 km) upstream, and flooding parts of Townsville to a depth of 2 metres (6 ft 7 in).

Cyclone Mahina, in March 1899, resulted in the greatest death toll of any natural disaster in Australian history. Over 400 people lost their lives. The storm decimated a pearling fleet at Bathurst Bay in Queensland and deaths included the crews of around 100 vessels and an estimated 100 local aboriginals, who were swept out to sea while trying to save shipwrecked crew.

Two of the country's strongest cyclones occurred on the North Queensland coast in 1918. The Mackay Cyclone struck Mackay and surrounding regions in late January 1918, in addition to a devastating storm surge and extensive flooding. A Category 4 cyclone with barometric pressure at the eye as low as 933 hectopascals (13.53 psi), Mackay and Rockhampton experienced the death of some 30 people, hundreds of injuries, and A$60 million damage. Of the approximately 1400 homes in the Mackay township, 1300 were destroyed or severely damaged.

10 March 1918 saw an even stronger cyclone and storm surge cross the coast at Innisfail, with further desolation at Cairns, Babinda, and on the Atherton Tableland. Barometric pressure measured from outside the cyclone eye was recorded at 926 hectopascals (13.43 psi). Estimates based on height of the storm surge suggest the 1918 Innisfail Cyclone was a "super typhoon" with pressures below 900 hpa at the eye, however recording equipment at the storm centre was badly damaged so an accurate minimum could not be obtained. 37 people perished in the township of Innisfail, with a further 40-60 Aboriginals estimated to have died in outlying areas. With a population of 3500, Innisfail saw only 12 houses remain unscathed.

A cyclone in Northern Queensland killed 99 people over two days in mid March 1934.

A cyclone struck the Gold Coast on 20 February 1954. Four people were killed during the cyclone, while a further 22 died in the resulting floods around Lismore in Northern New South Wales.

=== 2008 ===
On 16 November 2008, Brisbane was hit by a thunderstorm with wind gusts up to 130 kilometres per hour (81 mph) reaching speeds of Category 2 tropical cyclones, and flooding throughout the region. Areas were declared disaster zones, with one of the worst hit areas being The Gap, a north-western suburb, where roofs were lifted off houses, trees were uprooted, and cars were destroyed by falling debris, destruction typical of tropical cyclones. Recovery efforts were hampered as further storms continued throughout the week.

=== 2010/11 ===
A series of severe weather events hit Queensland, Australia, beginning in December 2010 and continuing into January 2011.

=== 2014 ===
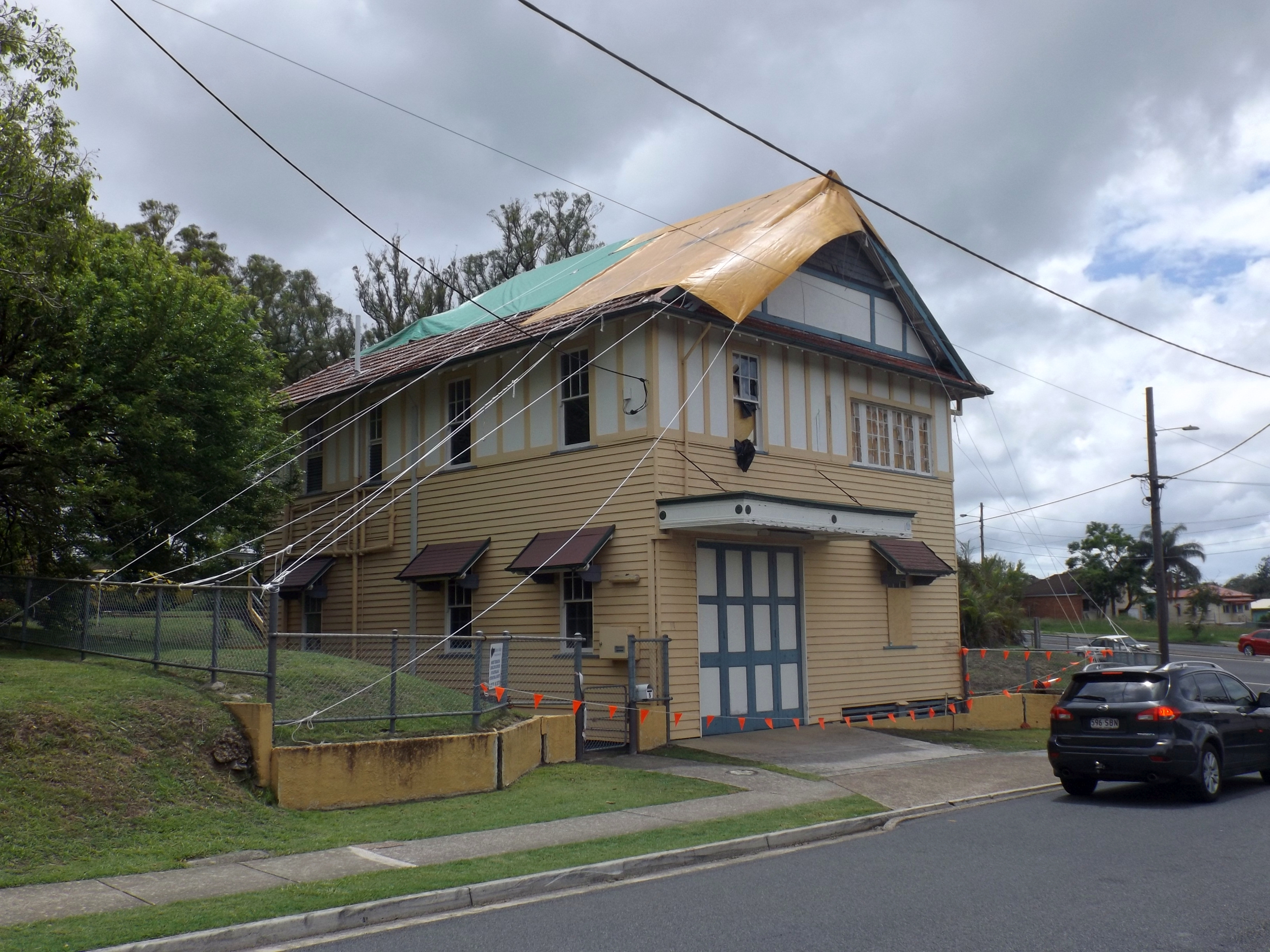
The Yeronga Fire Station covered by tarpaulins in January 2015

On 27 November 2014, Brisbane was hit by a Mesoscale convective system which brought wind gusts up to 141 kilometres per hour (88 mph), reaching speeds of Category 2 tropical cyclones, and hail stones up to 8 centimetres (3.1 in) in diameter. It was the worst storm to hit Brisbane since 18 January 1985 and caused over A$1 billion in damage. 39 people were injured, although none seriously (though 12 required hospital treatment). There was widespread flooding and hail damage in the city and the suburbs of Inala, Archerfield, Moorooka, Annerley, West End, Toowong, Fortitude Valley and Bowen Hills. Light aircraft were flipped over at Archerfield Airport. Due to the vast number of buildings and cars that were hail-damaged, insurance assessments and repairs took many months.

=== 2018 ===
On 18 October and 22 December 2018 the Gold Coast got hit with supercell storms producing hail the size of golf balls and damaging winds.

=== 2019 ===
On 14 November there was a hail storm with hail the size of cricket balls, with Biggera Bay being the worst hit.
On 13 December another severe storm hit the very South of QLD 120 millimetres (4.7 in) of rain and left Biggera Waters, and Labrador without mains power.

=== 2020 ===
On 31 October 2020, a supercell thunderstorm impacted most of South East Queensland, with giant hail up to 13 cm was reported in Hillcrest. Giant hail of 14 cm in diameter was observed in Forestdale. An emergency alert was issued for Lockyer Valley, Ipswich, Jimboomba and Amberley at first, then another alert was issued for parts of the Gold Coast, some locations include Coomera, Southport, Beenleigh. This supercell caused over $980 million in insurance costs and had 296,000 lightning strikes.

=== 2023 ===
==== 15 & 16 December 2023 ====
On 15 December 2023, a fast-moving severe thunderstorm struck South East Queensland producing a wind gust of 169 kilometres per hour (125 mph) over Archerfield Airport around 4:30pm. This same storm then also caused hailstones between 3 and 4 cm in Southern Brisbane and caused 50mm of rainfall in 30 minutes in areas west of The Gold Coast. The storm resulted in the death of a 30-year-old man caused by fallen powerlines, and the loss of power to 19,000 properties across council areas in South Eastern Queensland. The winds inside of the storm near Archerfield also damaged 9 planes at the Airport and beat the previous record set at Archerfield of 143 kilometres per hour (89 mph) set back in December 1946. A day later on 16 December 2023, a girl was struck by lightning from storms on the Sunshine Coast.

==== 25 December 2023 ====
On Christmas night around 8:30pm Tornadic Supercell storm event begun to build around Cedar Vale east of Jimboomba moving south-south east towards Tamborine Mountain knocking out power lines and toppling and uprooting large trees. Several eyewitness accounts spoke of a funnel formation with wind gusts of up to 160 kilometres per hour (99 mph) via a private weather station on top of the mountain. As it continued to move south-south east towards Wongawallan, houses lost roofs and in some places buildings completely destroyed. By 9:05–9:15pm it tracked across Upper Coomera and Oxenford where "an image was shared of what can clearly be seen as a tornado making landfall sweeping over Helensvale. Houses in Helensvale and Oxenford recorded wind gusts of 204 kilometres per hour (127 mph) making these the worst affected areas. Almost all mature aged trees were uprooted on both of these roads. The tornado then reduced to 169 kilometres per hour (105 mph) over Coombabah and caused destruction in Runaway Bay, Hope Island and Paradise Point. It then left out through the sea at 9:30pm. There were thousands of lightning strikes tracked in the "heat lightning" event. Over 130,000 houses were left without power for days following the event as well as long cleanup efforts, known as "the largest clean-up in Gold Coast’s history".

== South Australia ==
=== 2016 ===
On 28 September a storm described as a one-in-50-years event led to the entire state of South Australia losing power. There has been widespread flooding throughout the state and more storms have caused further damage.

== Victoria ==
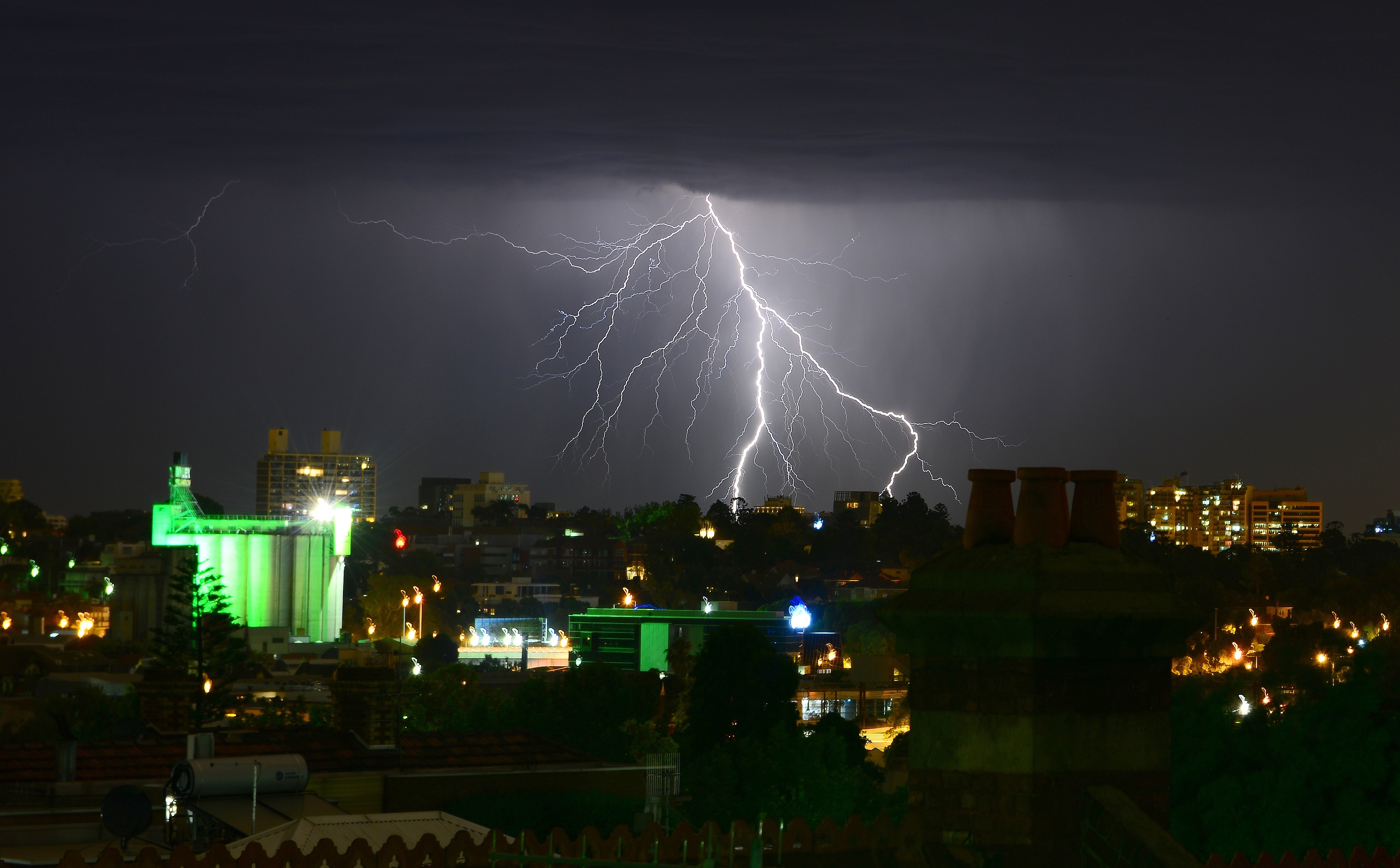
Lightning over Melbourne, 2014

=== 2003 ===
A severe weather event occurred over the city of Melbourne, and surrounding areas of Victoria were tornadoes, from 1 to 6 December 2003. The storm formed at around midnight on the night of 2 December. The two hours from midnight to 2 am saw extremely heavy rainfall, with some areas recording more than 100 mm (3.9 in) of rain in that time. The rapid rain fall caused flash flooding, which resulted in extensive damage to property. At the time the Australian Bureau of Meteorology called the storm a "once in 100 year event", but similarly severe storms struck Melbourne in 2005 and 2010.

=== 2005 ===
An unusually intense low-pressure system developed over Eastern Bass Strait on 2 February 2005. After a spell of warm days with a north to north easterly airflow over much of eastern Australia, the region suffered the effects of one of the most intense summer time weather systems on record. Southern NSW, South Australia and Tasmania also received substantial rainfall during this event; however, the highest rainfalls were concentrated in Victoria. The event made February 2005, Victoria's wettest February since 1973 and the 7th wettest in the last 106 years. The cold air associated with this system also assisted in the month of February in Victoria being its coolest since 1954. Many rainfall and temperature records were broken in the course of the event as the system passed across eastern Australia.

The system brought abnormally low temperatures and severe storms with gale and storm force winds to most parts of the region. However, the continuous rainfall for about 30 hours was perhaps the most significant feature produced by the low-pressure system. The rainfall resulted in widespread flooding, particularly over Central Victoria and West and South Gippsland. Unseasonable snowfalls were observed on the Australian Alps. Although low-pressure systems in February are not uncommon, the slow and westward moving nature of this particular system was extraordinary. The centre of the low developed and deepened over Melbourne with very little movement. The combination of extreme rainfall and lashing winds caused destruction.

=== 2010 ===
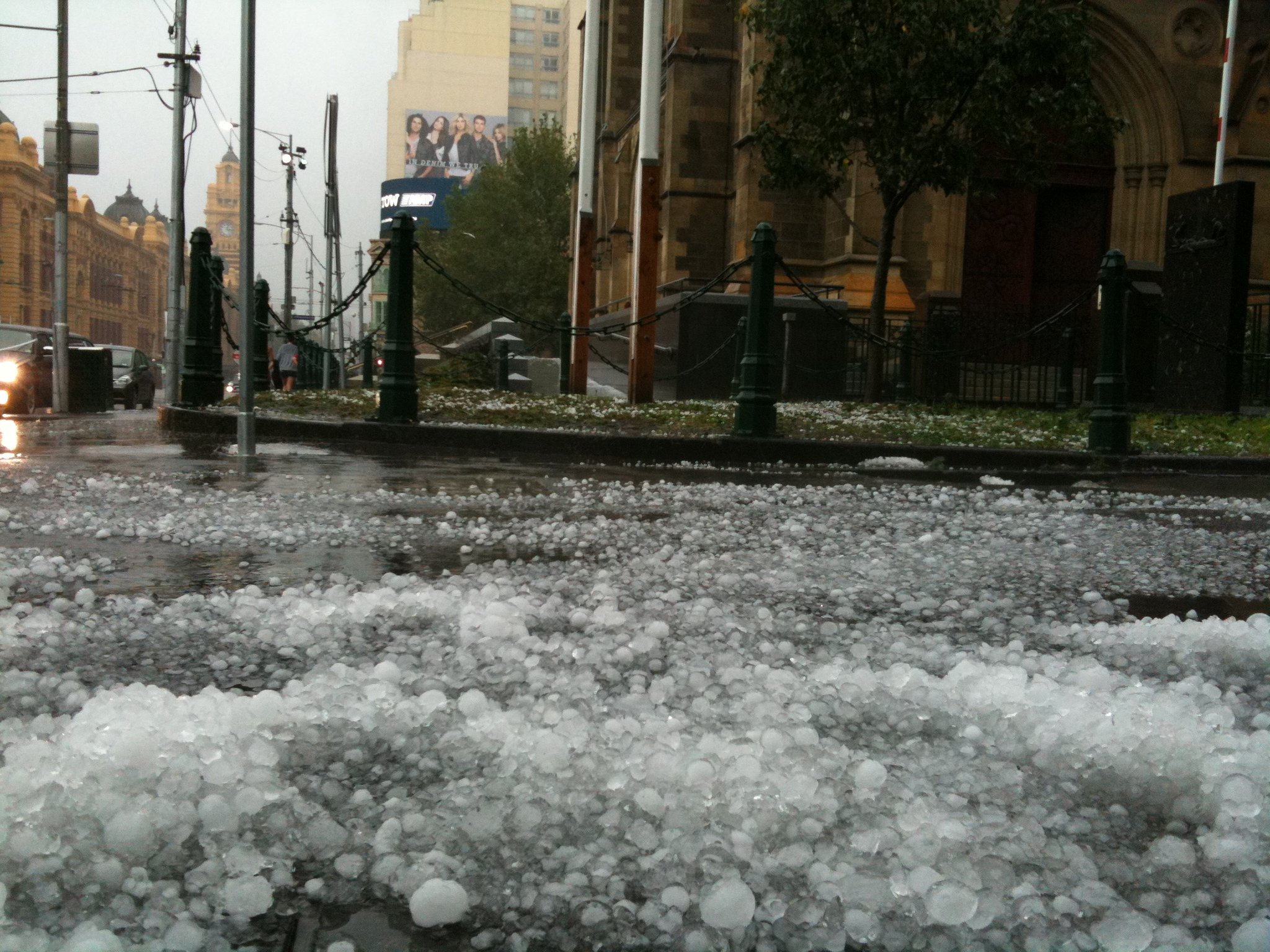
Hail in Melbourne after 6 March 2010 storm

6 March 2010 brought one of the worst hail storms to ever hit Melbourne. The storm occurred due to the collision of warm humid air moving southwards, and a cold front moving from the south-west. The resulting storms moved from north to south, wreaking havoc across Shepparton in the state's north, uprooting trees and damaging roofs. As the storms passed over central Melbourne they released large hailstones and very heavy rainfall, causing localised flash flooding and extensive property damage.

=== 2011 ===
In the days preceding 25 December 2011, a high blocking pattern developed over south–east Australia, with a quasi-stationary high residing over New Zealand and a trough extending over Victoria from the interior of the continent. This stationary pattern allowed for a number of days of warm, moist northerly airflow across Victoria which lead to high moisture levels through a deep layer creating unstable conditions. Severe thunderstorms developed in the east and on Christmas Day an upper-level trough approaching from the west lead to strong low-level shear allowing the unstable atmosphere to develop a number of supercells (very severe long lasting thunderstorm cells) around the Melbourne area, chiefly through the northern suburbs. The temperature rose to 30 °C (86 °F), with a forecast of mostly sunny with a chance of afternoon thunderstorms.

Around 3:00pm a small storm cell formed just north of Melton and within 30 minutes the storm grew into a supercell and was headed straight for Melbourne's western suburbs. It was reported by residents that before the storm hit a loud roar could be heard, this was the sound of hail the size of tennis balls. Numerous reports of large hail were received, ranging from 8 centimetres (3.1 in) in diameter and causing significant damage to property, transport and infrastructure. Flash flooding occurred as a result of very heavy rainfall and multiple storms moving over the same location. The worst affected areas were the northern and eastern suburbs of Melbourne including Taylors Lakes, Keilor, Eltham, Greensborough/Doncaster and Keilor Downs. Tornadoes hit Fiskville, powerful enough to upend cars, and Melton. The Victorian SES handled more than 2000 calls in the first six hours; Powercor reported more than 3300 people without power; Jemena recorded more than 20,000 within its distribution area of inner Melbourne in result of the storm; Melbourne airport was closed; and the Insurance Council of Australia estimated a total damages bill of A$100 million. The storm blacked out more than 20,000 homes with major outages in Port Melbourne, Ballarat, Armadale, Essendon, South Morang, Toorak and South Melbourne. The Bureau of Meteorology predicted a morning shower and a maximum of 23 °C (73 °F) for the following day.

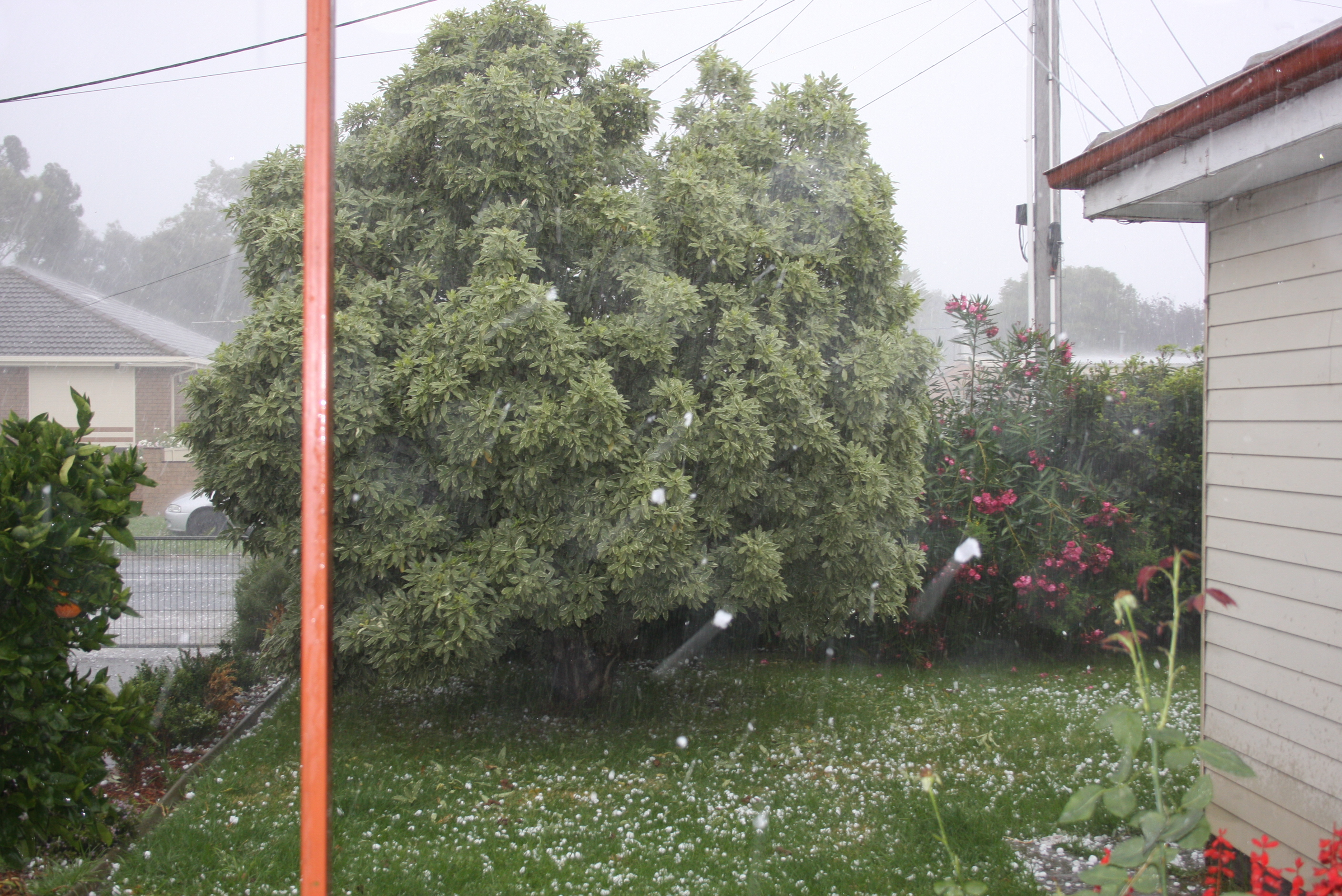
Rain & hail under the Dec 2011 supercell that hit Melbourne.

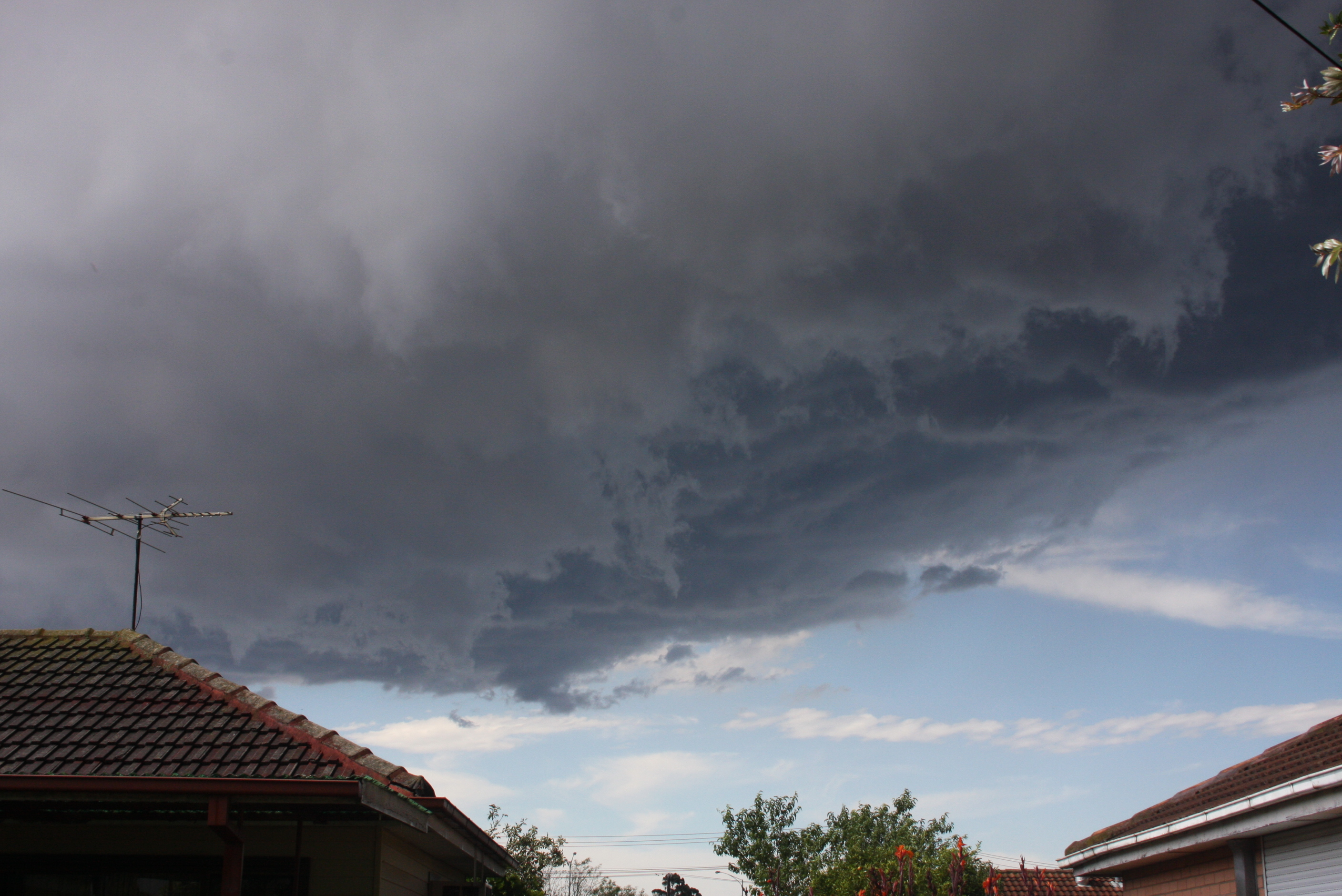
Supercell passing over St Albans

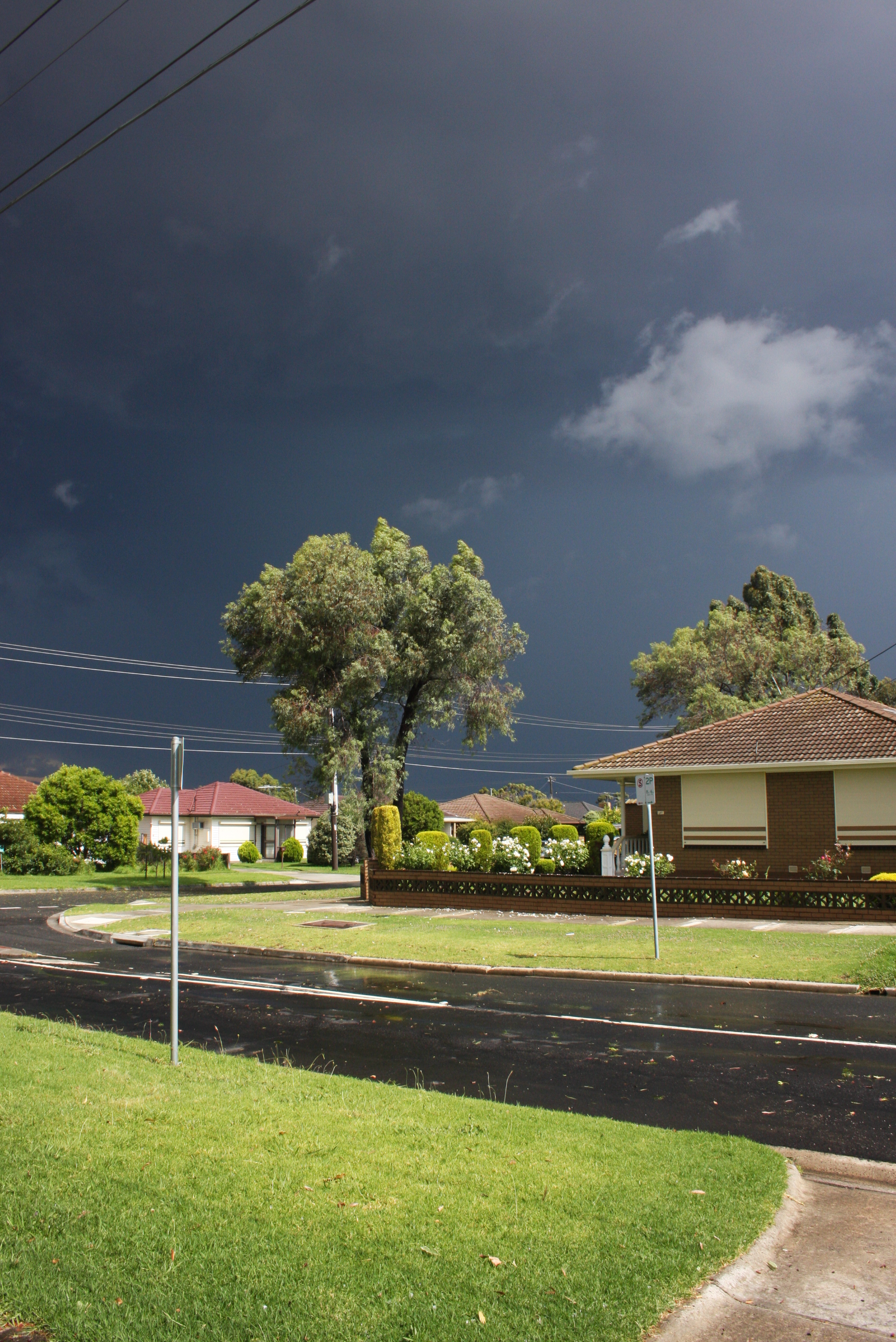
Supercell heading to Melbourne CBD.

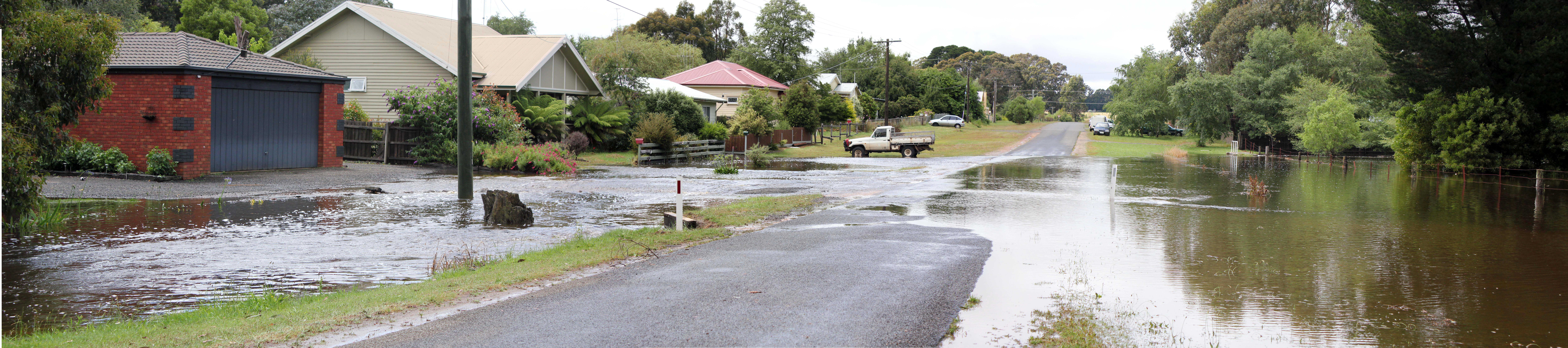
A street in Trentham during the summer 2011 flooding.

=== 2012 ===
The worst severe storm to hit Ballarat brought heavy rain and hail, and strong winds on 30 November 2012. It damaged and flooded homes and sent roofs flying. It destroyed some homes in Mt. Clear, and almost destroyed a school in Sebastopol.

=== 2016 ===
On 21 November 2016, Melbourne experienced a thunderstorm asthma event which killed 9 people. The hot, windy conditions on the evening of the storm led to the spread of fine grass pollen particles, which sparked asthma symptoms in thousands of people across the city.

=== 2020 ===
On 27 August 2020 there were severe storms across Melbourne and southern Victoria. 3 people were killed including a 4-year-old boy. 200,000 residents in 101 suburbs were put under a boil water notice which was lifted 4 days later.

== Western Australia ==
The northern coast of Western Australia is frequently ravaged by severe storms.

On 25 December 1869, a cyclone levelled the towns of Roebourne and Cossack with many deaths.

In 1875, a cyclone destroyed the pearling fleet in the Exmouth Gulf, resulting in 59 deaths.

In 1877, six barques, six men and cargoes of guano worth £20,000 were lost at the Lacepede Islands.

In 1880, a 20 feet (6.1 m) storm surge obliterated Onslow.

In 1881, Cossack was destroyed again with ships ending up miles onshore and 12,000 sheep drowned at Ashburton.

In 1887, a cyclone at Eighty Mile Beach sank five barques and four schooners, killing hundreds of people.

In 1892, 15 luggers and 40 men were lost at Onslow.

In 1894, Roebourne (population 4,000) and Cossack (population 2,000) were hit with storms that destroyed almost all buildings.

In 1894, a cyclone near Roebourne and Geraldton killed 61-71 people.

In March 1907, a cyclone in the Exmouth Gulf destroyed 15 pearling luggers, 2 schooners, and five Japanese people drowned.

=== 2010 ===
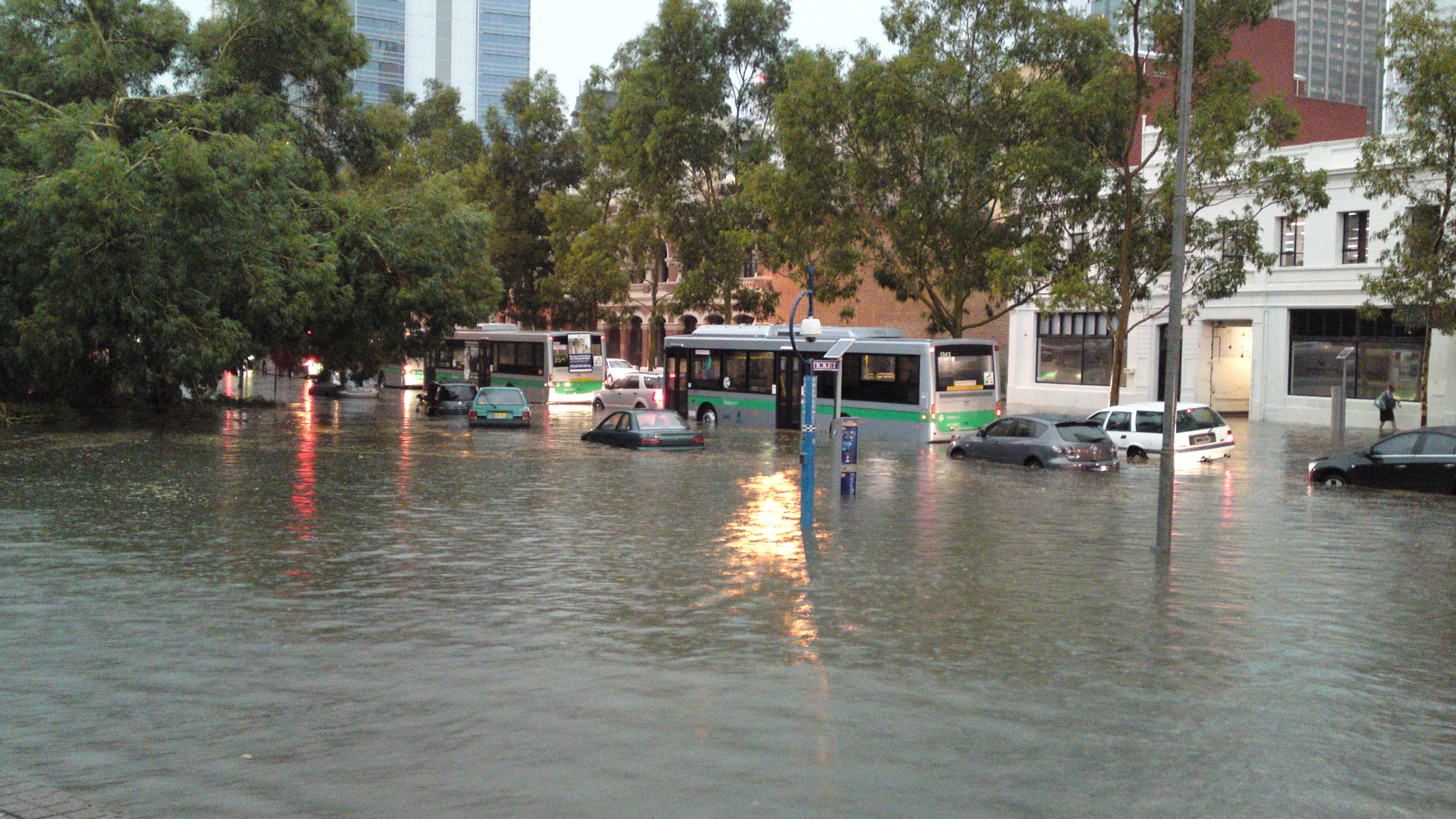
Flash flooding in Perth, 2010

On 22 March 2010, a hail storm struck Perth with golf ball sized hail, gale-force winds up to 120 kilometres per hour (75 mph), and 40 millimetres (1.6 in) of rain. Frequent lightning strikes bought 120,000 homes without power with mudslides wrecking several homes. The storm was formed by a sudden wind change that combined with a surface trough, allowing the storm to move south and hit the entire southwest of Western Australia.

== See also ==
- List of Australian region cyclone seasons
- List of disasters in Australia by death toll
