= Yamba Drive =

Road in Canberra, Australia

Yamba Drive Australian Capital Territory
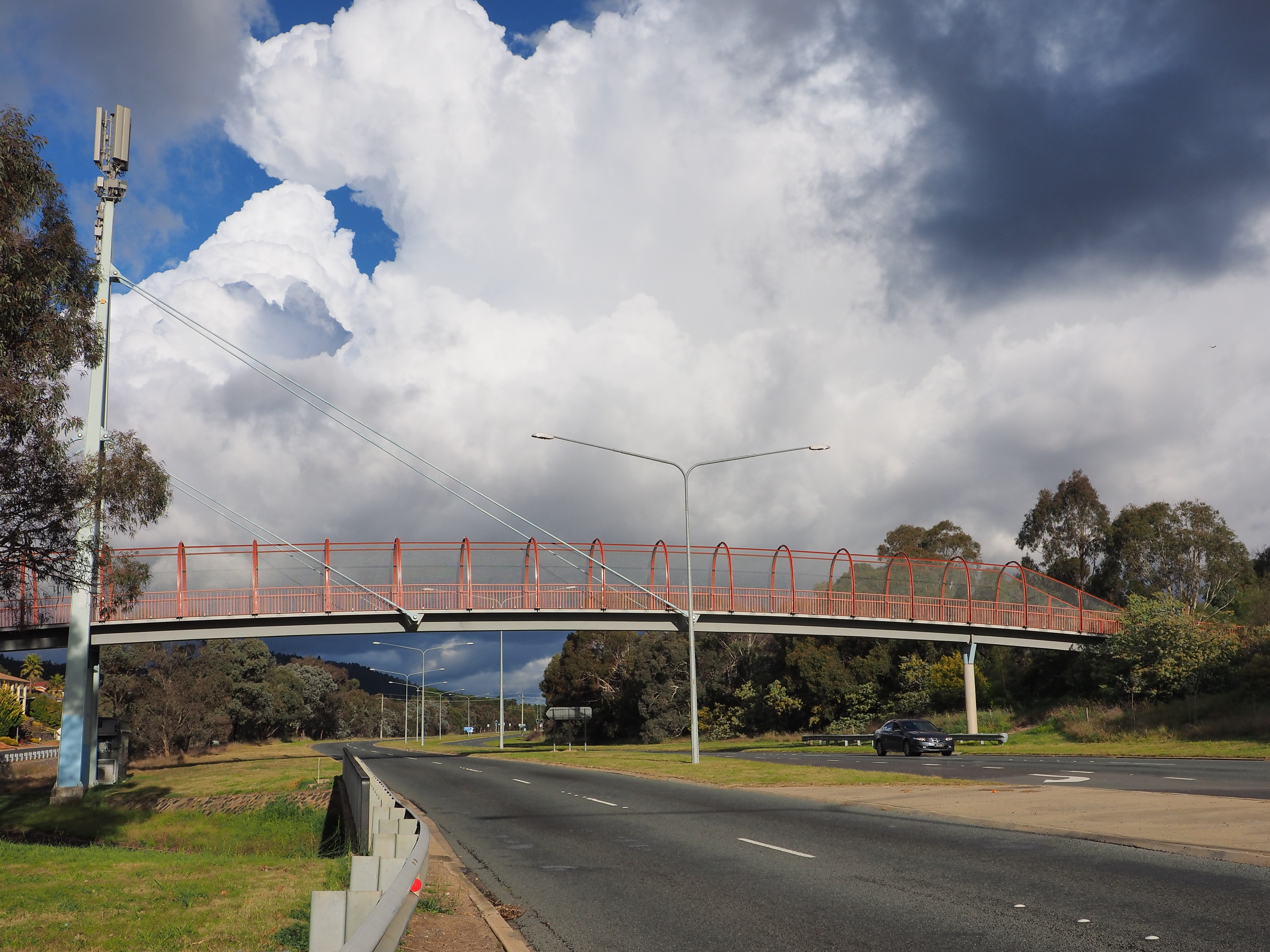
- Yamba Drive in June 2014

General information
- Type: Road
- Length: 6.1 km (3.8 mi)

Major junctions
- North end: Yarra Glen; Melrose Drive; Phillip, Australian Capital Territory
- Hindmarsh Drive; Long Gully Road
- South end: Erindale Drive; Farrer, Australian Capital Territory

Location(s)
- Major suburbs: Woden Valley

Yamba Drive is a major arterial road in the southern suburbs of Canberra, the capital city of Australia. It is named after 'Yamba', a pastoral property established by the Eddison family in 1920 as part of the soldier settlement scheme which occupied the area prior to suburban development in the Woden Valley. The road forms part a major link between the Tuggeranong and Woden Valley districts, bypassing the Woden Town Centre and is an important access corridor for Canberra Hospital. Yamba Drive begins at a large roundabout north of the Woden Town Centre (the southern terminus of Yarra Glen). It continues south-east past the Woden Cemetery and Canberra Hospital to a major junction with Hindmarsh Drive, before passing between the residential suburbs of O'Malley, Mawson, Issacs and Farrer before terminating between the Issacs and Farrer ridges in the Canberra Nature Park. Beyond this point, the route continues as Erindale Drive into the suburbs of the Tuggeranong District.
