= Richard Whitaker =

Australian meteorologist and author (born 1947)

Richard Northcroft "Dick" Whitaker (born 15 July 1947) is an Australian meteorologist and author. Whitaker is the chief meteorologist on The Weather Channel, following his thirty-year career as a meteorologist with the Bureau of Meteorology.

== Bureau of Meteorology ==
Whitaker began working with the Bureau of Meteorology in 1971, aged twenty-four. A decade later, he was promoted to the role of officer in charge of the facilities and information section of the Bureau. He held this position for three years, before being promoted again to senior operational forecaster in the Sydney bureau, Australia's largest.

In 1984, he was presented with an Australia Day Achievement Award for his work in meteorology. In 1992, Whitaker became the New South Wales manager for the Special Services Unit, the commercial arm of the Bureau during the 1990s, and this work involved enhanced communication of meteorology to the public via mass media. Between 1999 and 2001 Whitaker worked with the World Meteorological Organisation as a rapporteur for the Committee of Agricultural Meteorology. After leaving the Bureau in 2002 he became the chief meteorologist for the Weather Channel.

== Research and developments ==
Whitaker is partly credited with the initial development of precipitation charts for the Australian mass media. Such charts are now used throughout the print and electronic media to convey data about present and future rainfall in graphical form.

In his second year at the Bureau of Meteorology, 1972, he developed and authored a manual for aviation forecasting in New South Wales, still used today. Whitaker also researched the correlation between sea surface temperatures in the Indian Ocean and rainfall in Australia, which is now used as a routine consideration in the production of seasonal rainfall outlooks.

== Publications and media ==
Whitaker is the chief meteorologist on The Weather Channel, having joined the station in 2002. On air, his first name is abbreviated to "Dick". He also presents numerous radio weather crosses to a selection of stations around Australia on a daily basis. Whitaker has authored or co-authored several books about weather and historical topics, having a particular interest in natural disasters.

=== List of publications ===
- Colls, Keith, Whitaker, Richard (2001). The Australian Weather Book. Sydney, Australia: Reed New Holland. p. 216. ISBN 1-876334-68-1.
- Whitaker, Richard (2004). Firewise, Fire-Safe: How to Survive a Bushfire. Sydney, Australia: Reed New Holland. pp. ?. ISBN 1-877069-16-7.
- Whitaker, Richard (2008). Understanding Climate Change. Sydney, Australia: New Holland. p. 240. ISBN 9781877069437.
- Whitaker, Richard (2005). Australia's Natural Disasters. Sydney, Australia: Reed New Holland. p. 239. ISBN 1-877069-04-3.
- Whitaker, Richard (2008). Disasters Events and Moments that Changed the World. Sydney, Australia: Reed New Holland. p. 272. ISBN 978-1-74110-563-6.
- Whitaker, Richard (2010). The Complete Book of Australian Weather. Sydney, Australia: Allen & Unwin. p. 175. ISBN 978-1-74175-734-7.
- Whitaker, Richard (2021). Weather, Waves & Water, The New South Wales Central Coast. Sydney, Australia: Weathersmart Publishing. ISBN 9780648883609.
