= Yarra Glen (Canberra) =

Major road in Australia

Yarra Glen Australian Capital Territory

General information
- Type: Parkway
- Location: Canberra
- Length: 3 km (1.9 mi)
- Opened: 21 December 1967
- Gazetted: 29 September 1966
- Former route number: ACT Tourist Drive 5 (through Deakin)

Major junctions
- North end: Adelaide Avenue; Deakin, Australian Capital Territory
- Carruthers Street
- South end: Yamba Drive; Melrose Drive; Hughes, Australian Capital Territory

Location(s)
- Major suburbs / towns: Yarralumla, Deakin, Curtin, Hughes

Highway system
- Highways in Australia; National Highway • Freeways in Australia; Road infrastructure in Canberra

Yarra Glen is a major grade separated arterial road in Canberra, Australia. It is 3 km (1.9 mi) in length and connects South Canberra to the Woden Valley district. It links at its northern end to Adelaide Avenue, and at its southern end to Melrose Drive and Yamba Drive via a large roundabout. It was designed to have no traffic lights nor cross roads on it.

== Route description ==
Yarra Glen continues from the western end of Adelaide Avenue, at Novar Street interchange. As the road begins to curve towards the south ramps are provided to Cotter Road, the road continues in a gradual curve before straightening when heading roughly north–south. Another interchange is provided halfway along this section to Carruthers Street, and the roadway terminates at a large roundabout at the northern end of Woden Town Centre, which interfaces with the northern ends of Melrose Drive and Yamba Drive.

== History ==
The National Capital Development Commission unveiled its plans for Yarra Glen, which was then known as the Woden Parkway, on 22 January 1965. It was originally proposed to continue north through Yarralumla to meet with a then unbuilt extension what is now part of Parkes Way on the northern side of Lake Burley Griffin, this would have included a major bridge across the lake twice the length of the Commonwealth Avenue bridge. And also to have extended further south into the Woden Valley, connecting via a number of interchanges to collector roads. and each carriageway was to have 2 or 3 lanes depending on location, which provision for a fourth. The posted speed limit was to be up to 50 mph (80 km/h).

The contract to build Stage 1 of the envisaged Woden Parkway, which stretched from Adelaide Avenue to the Carruthers Street interchange, was awarded to Leighton Contractors in May 1966. By this stage, plans required two lanes per carriageway to be built instead, with provision for a third. The construction of the roadway required partial closure of Adelaide Avenue, with traffic diverted through existing thoroughfares in nearby suburbs.

The second stage of what was now known as Yarra Glen, which stretched from Carruthers Street interchange to Melrose Drive was also built by Leighton Contractors, and completed was opened on 21 December 1967.

The final name of Yarra Glen is based upon an early homestead in the area which bore the same name. It was gazetted on 29 September 1966. A spokesman for the Department of the Interior said that the usual roadway suffixes weren't used as the name sounded better without them.

Currently, Yarra Glen has not been extended beyond the second stage of the originally envisaged Woden Parkway, with the at-grade Callam Street and Athllon Drive taking the place of further grade-separated construction to the south, neither road connects directly to Yarra Glen. Plans were abandoned for an extension to the north with the nearby Tuggeranong Parkway taking over the function of the originally proposed northern extension, but instead located to the west of Lake Burley Griffin. The roadway still has 2 standard lanes per carriageway, though an additional bus lane has been added along most of the northbound extension. The current posted speed limit is 80 km/h (50 mph).

== Junctions ==
District	Location	km	mi	Destinations	Notes
Canberra Central	Yarralumla, Deakin	0	0.0	Kent Street – Yarralumla, Deakin, Royal Australian Mint, Weston Park, Calvary John James Hospital	Partial diamond interchange, no westbound onramp, no eastbound offramp; Yarra Glen Terminus: continues eastwards as Adelaide Avenue
Canberra Central	Yarralumla, Deakin	0.5	0.31	Cotter Road – Weston Creek, Tuggeranong, Government House, Tidbinbilla Nature Reserve	Partial semi-directional T interchange, no westbound onramp, no eastbound offramp
Canberra Central, Woden Valley	Deakin, Curtin, Hughes	1.9	1.2	Carruthers Street – Curtin, Hughes, Royal Australian Mint, Calvary John James Hospital	Diamond interchange
Woden Valley	Curtin, Hughes	3.0	1.9	Yamba Drive / Melrose Drive - Woden Town Centre, Tuggeranong, Weston Creek, Canberra Hospital	Roundabout with southbound bypass lane to Yamba Drive, northbound bus-only bypass lane from Melrose Drive; Yarra Glen Terminus: continues southeast as Yamba Drive and southwest as Melrose Drive
1.000 mi = 1.609 km; 1.000 km = 0.621 mi: Incomplete access
