= List of Towson University people =

These are some of the more notable alumni, attendees and faculty of Towson University, a public university located in Towson in Baltimore County, Maryland, United States, and its predecessor institutions.

== Arts and entertainment ==
- Shereen Ahmed, actress, singer
- John Auville, co-host of The Sports Junkies on WJFK, 106.7
- Behnaz Babazadeh, photographer
- Jeff Bakalar, CBS Interactive podcast host and on-air personality
- Brandon Broady, host of BET's The Xperiment
- Jack Dunlop, streamer and esports caster
- Charles S. Dutton, actor
- Charla Baklayan Faddoul and Mirna Hindoyan, contestants on the fifth and eleventh (all-star version) editions on the multiple-Emmy Award-winning game show The Amazing Race
- Mike Flanagan, filmmaker (The Haunting of Hill House, Doctor Sleep, Gerald's Game, Hush, Before I Wake, Oculus, Absentia, The Fall of the House of Usher, Life of Chuck)
- Mike Gazzo, producer/songwriter
- John Glover, Smallville star; graduated and received an honorary master's degree; frequently visits the theater department to work with students; recognized as a Distinguished Alumnus in May 2008
- Andy Karl, Broadway actor, best known for his Tony-nominated performance in Rocky the Musical
- John Kassir, film, stage and TV actor and producer, comedian, voice actor
- Stacy Keibler, actress, dancer, model, former Baltimore Ravens cheerleader and former WWE wrestler, was part of Towson's Mass Communications department; her graduation is uncertain
- Chris LaMartina, director, producer, and writer
- Brad Mays, filmmaker (The Watermelon, SING*ularity, The Bacchae); former Baltimore, New York and Los Angeles stage director
- Pattie McCarthy, poet and educator
- Ross Rawlings, pianist, composer, conductor, and music director
- Mike Riley, cartoonist, graduated with a BA in Fine Arts
- Howard Rollins, Academy Award-nominated actor known for his portrayal of Coalhouse Walker, Jr. in the film Ragtime, and as Virgil Tibbs on the NBC/CBS television series In the Heat of the Night
- Mike Rowe, Discovery Channel's Dirty Jobs host
- Gerry Sandusky, sportscaster for WBAL-TV Channel 11 in Baltimore; son of Baltimore Colts' John Sandusky
- Dwight Schultz, TV actor, played Capt. "Howling Mad" Murdock on The A-Team and Lieutenant Reginald Barclay in Star Trek: The Next Generation; graduated with a BA in Arts
- Amy Schumer, comedian, actress, and contestant on Last Comic Standing
- Drew Van Acker, actor, plays Jason DiLaurentis on Pretty Little Liars

== Sports ==
- Jermon Bushrod, former NFL player drafted by the New Orleans Saints (#125th pick) in 2007 draft
- Kacy Catanzaro, professional wrestler and first woman to complete the qualifying course of American Ninja Warrior
- Dan Crowley, former CFL player for multiple teams; currently a staff member of the Towson Athletic Department
- Jordan Dangerfield (born 1990), NFL player, Pittsburgh Steelers
- Ryan Delaire, NFL player, San Francisco 49ers
- Kyle Fiat, professional lacrosse player, Philadelphia Wings
- Tamir Goodman, professional basketball player once known as the "Jewish Jordan"
- Justin Gorham (born 1998), basketball player in the Israeli Basketball Premier League
- Sean Landeta, former NFL player for the New York Giants
- Ryan Lexer (born 1976), American-Israeli basketball player
- Mike Locksley, Maryland Terrapins football Head Coach, 2012
- Dave Meggett, former NFL player for the New York Giants and New England Patriots
- Machel Millwood, forward, Baltimore Blast
- Chris Nabholz, former MLB pitcher, Montreal Expos (1990–1993), Cleveland Indians (1994), Boston Red Sox (1994) and Chicago Cubs (1995)
- Gary Neal, NBA player, Washington Wizards
- Richie Palacios, MLB player, St. Louis Cardinals
- John Schuerholz, Atlanta Braves President; frequent donor to the university; namesake of Towson's baseball park (John B. Schuerholz Baseball Complex)
- Chad Scott, former NFL player, New England Patriots
- Gerrard Sheppard, CFL player, Winnipeg Blue Bombers
- Tye Smith, NFL player, Tennessee Titans
- Joe Vitt, assistant head coach for the Miami Dolphins
- Casper Wells, MLB player, Chicago Cubs
- Terrance West, running back for the Baltimore Ravens
- Madieu Williams, NFL player, Washington Redskins; transferred from Towson to finish college career at University of Maryland, College Park
- Bruce Zimmermann, pitcher for the Baltimore Orioles

== Music ==
- Cecylia Barczyk, cellist
- John Christ, guitar player for Danzig, dropped out in 1987
- YBN Cordae, hip-hop artist, dropped out in 2018
- Dave East, hip-hop artist
- Ellery Eskelin, jazz saxophonist, internationally recognized touring and recording artist
- Kyle Hollingsworth, keyboardist for The String Cheese Incident
- Joe Nice, dubstep DJ

== Writers ==
- P. Kenneth Burns, former WYPR Reporter, current WHYY Reporter
- Jack L. Chalker, author of over 50 science fiction novels; graduated in 1966; awarded as a Distinguished Alumni, College of Liberal Arts, 2003
- William Glauber, journalist
- Ronald Malfi, novelist, graduated in 1999
- W. Wesley McDonald, author of Russell Kirk and the Age of Ideology and former professor at Elizabethtown College
- David Ben Moshe, author, speaker, and fitness coach
- Brian Stelter, CNN

== Politics and government ==
=== U.S. representatives ===
- Sarah Elfreth, U.S. representative from Maryland's 3rd congressional district, 2025–present, member of the Maryland State Senate, 2019–2025

=== Judiciary of Maryland ===
- Mary Ellen Barbera (1975), chief judge, Court of Appeals of Maryland, 2013–2021
- Katie O'Malley (1985), associate judge, District Court for Baltimore City, Maryland; wife of former Maryland governor and former Baltimore mayor, Martin O'Malley

=== State delegates ===
- Charles E. Barkley (1972), member of the Maryland House of Delegates, 1999–2019
- John L. Bohanan, Jr. (1981), member of the Maryland House of Delegates, 1999–2015
- Michael W. Burns (1980), former member of the Maryland House of Delegates, 1995–99
- Ann Marie Doory (1976), former member of the Maryland House of Delegates, 1987–2010
- Tawanna P. Gaines (1981), member of the Maryland House of Delegates, 2001–2019
- Melissa J. Kelly (1987), former member of the Maryland House of Delegates, 2001–02
- Susan W. Krebs (1981), member of the Maryland House of Delegates, 2003–2023
- Stephen W. Lafferty (1977), member of Maryland House of Delegates, 2007–2019
- Christian Miele (2004, 2008), former member of the Maryland House of Delegates, 2015–2019
- Warren E. Miller (1987), member of the Maryland House of Delegates, 2003–2020
- Nathaniel T. Oaks, former member of the Maryland House of Delegates, 1983–1989, and 1995–2018
- B. Daniel Riley (1978), former member of the Maryland House of Delegates, 1999–2003, and 2007–2011
- Tanya Thornton Shewell (1970), former member of the Maryland House of Delegates, 2004–2011
- Kathy Szeliga (1994), member of the Maryland House of Delegates, 2011–present

=== State senate ===
- Pamela Beidle (1994), former member of the Maryland House of Delegates, 2007–present, member of the Maryland Senate, 2019–present
- Michael J. Hough (2007), member of the Maryland Senate, 2015–2023, former member of the Maryland House of Delegates, 2011–2014
- Karen S. Montgomery, former member of the Maryland Senate, 2010–2016

=== County executives ===
- Calvin B. Ball, III (1997), member of the Howard County Council, 2006–2018, Howard County executive 2018–present
- David R. Craig (1971), former member of the Maryland Senate, 1995–99, former Harford County Executive, 2005–2014, former Maryland Secretary of Planning 2015–2016
- Kathy Klausmeier, Baltimore County executive, 2025–present, member of the Maryland Senate, 2003–2025

=== Local government ===
- Sheila A. Dixon (1976), former president of the Baltimore City Council, 1999–2007, former Mayor of Baltimore, 2007–2010
- Jolene Ivey (1982), member of the Prince George's County Council, 2018–present, former member of the Maryland House of Delegates, 2007–2015
- A. Wade Kach, former member of the Maryland House of Delegates, 1975–2014, member of the Baltimore County Council, 2014–present
- Pat Young (2010), member of the Baltimore County Council, 2022–present, former member of the Maryland House of Delegates, 2015–2023

== Faculty ==
- Phyllis Chinn, mathematics professor
- Beth Haller, journalism professor, Fulbright scholar
- Donald Minnegan, former coach of the school's championship soccer teams; namesake of the school's mascot, Doc
- Kathryn Nesbitt, assistant soccer referee
- Lynn Tomlinson, animator and artist
- Johnny Unitas, former quarterback for the Baltimore Colts; Towson Athletics' community liaison; raised funds for the school's athletic programs
- Richard Vatz, communication studies professor, author, former advisor for the Youth for Western Civilization chapter led by Matthew Heimbach, former advisor for the Turning Point USA chapter

== See also ==
- List of Towson alumni
