= Doc =

DOC, Doc, doc or DoC may refer to:

== People ==
- Doc (nickname)
- The D.O.C., American rapper (born 1968)
- Doc Gallows (born 1983), ring name of American professional wrestler Drew Hankinson
- Doc Redman (born 1997), American professional golfer

== Places ==
- Dóc, a village in Csongrád County, Hungary
- Dóc, the Hungarian name for Dolaţ village, Livezile, Timiș, Romania
- Dockyard railway station, Plymouth, England (National Rail station code "DOC")
- Democratic Republic of Congo (3-letter ISO alpha-3 code "DOC")

== Arts, entertainment, media ==
=== Fictional characters ===
==== In comics ====
- Doc Boy, from the Garfield series
- Doc, a short-eared, long-legged dog, in the cartoons of Elmer Andrews Bushnell

==== In film ====
- Emmett Brown, a scientist from Back to the Future
- Doc Hudson, in the film Cars
- Doc, in the 2013 animated film Escape from Planet Earth
- Doc, a dwarf in the animated 1937 Disney film Snow White and the Seven Dwarfs

==== In games ====
- Doc Louis, in the video game series Punch-Out!!
- Doc (Chrono Cross)

==== In literature ====
- Doc Daneeka, in the novel Catch-22
- Danny Torrance, a.k.a. Doc, in Stephen King's novel The Shining, its adaptations and as the protagonist in the sequel novel Doctor Sleep

==== In television ====
- Doc Adams (Gunsmoke), in the TV series Gunsmoke
- Doc Analyn, in the Philippine TV series Abot-Kamay na Pangarap
- Doc McStuffins, a Disney Junior title character
- Monte 'Doc' Parker, in the series Third Watch
- Doc Saturday, in the series The Secret Saturdays
- Doc (Buffyverse), in Buffy the Vampire Slayer
- Doc, in the series Fraggle Rock
- Doc, shopkeeper in Everybody Hates Chris

==== In other or multiple media ====
- Doc (mascot), the Towson University mascot
- Medical Officer Frank "Doc" DuFresne, in the web series Red vs. Blue
- Doc Savage, a pulp fiction hero
- Danny Torrance, a.k.a. Doc, in Stephen King's novel The Shining, its adaptations and as the protagonist in the sequel novel Doctor Sleep
- Doc (G.I. Joe), two characters in the G.I. Joe universe
- Doc (cartoon character), an animated cat introduced by Walter Lantz Studios in 1959

=== Television shows and episodes ===
- Doc (1975 TV series), a 1975–1976 American sitcom
- Doc (2001 TV series), a 2001–2004 American medical drama
- Doc (2025 TV series), a 2025 American medical drama based on the Italian TV series of the same name
- Doc (2026 TV series), a 2026 Mexican medical drama based on the Italian TV series of the same name
- Doc – Nelle tue mani, a 2020 Italian medical drama TV series, known simply as Doc in translation
- "D.O.C." (Lost), a 2007 television episode

=== Other uses in arts, entertainment, media ===
- Doc (film), a 1971 American Western film
- NPO Doc, a defunct Dutch television channel
- D.O.C., a 2019 album by Zucchero Fornaciari

== Organizations ==
=== Government departments ===
- United States Department of Commerce, the Cabinet department of the US government concerned with promoting economic growth
- New Zealand Department of Conservation, the public service department of New Zealand charged with the conservation of New Zealand's natural and historical heritage
- Department of Corrections, an umbrella term referring to a governmental agency responsible for overseeing the incarceration of persons convicted of crimes within a particular jurisdiction

=== Other organizations ===
- Doc+, a Russian medical company
- Dartmouth Outing Club, the oldest and largest collegiate outing club in the US
- Documentary Organization of Canada, known as DOC, a non-profit organization supporting documentary filmmakers in Canada
- Doc Films, a University of Chicago film society
- Christian Church (Disciples of Christ), a religious denomination in the US often referred to by the acronym "D.O.C."

== Food and wine appellations ==
- Denominazione di origine controllata, an Italian level of wine classification
- Denominação de Origem Controlada, a Portuguese level of classification
- Denominación de Origen Calificada, a Spanish level of classification

== Science and technology ==
=== Computing ===
- Doc (computing) (.doc), a word processing file format, typically used by Microsoft Word
- DiskOnChip, a type of flash memory device
- Dave's own version of Citadel, a bulletin board software variant
- Department of Computing, Imperial College London, the computer science department at Imperial College London

=== Medicine ===
- DOC, 11-Deoxycorticosterone, a steroid hormone
- DOC, 2,5-Dimethoxy-4-chloroamphetamine, a psychedelic amphetamine
- DOC, Deoxycholic acid, a bile acid

=== Other uses in science and technology ===
- Diesel Oxidation Catalyst, a diesel retrofit system for automobiles
- Dissolved organic carbon, a molecule classification
- Doc (aircraft), one of two airworthy Boeing B-29 Superfortress heavy bombers

== Other uses ==
- Doc (mascot), the Towson University mascot
- Doctor (title), often abbreviated "doc"
- Documentation, abbreviated "doc" or "docs"
- Day-old cockerel, a term in falconry
- North Dong, a language or dialect of China (ISO 639-3 code DOC)
- Declaration of conformity, a document declaring that a specific product complies with all relevant legal requirements

== See also ==
- Dock (disambiguation)
- Docs (disambiguation)
- Doctor (disambiguation)
- Documentation (disambiguation)
- Dox (disambiguation)
