= Dock (disambiguation) =

A dock is infrastructure used for berthing watercraft.

Dock or DOCK may also refer to:

== People ==
- Dock (given name), a list of people with the given name or nickname
- Dock or Hayden Scott-Baron (born 1980), English manga illustrator

== Plants and animals ==
- Dock, or dockweed, a name for plants in the genus Rumex, especially broad-leaved dock
- Tailhead, or dock, the beginning of an animal's tail

== Places ==
- The Dock, Newfoundland and Labrador, Canada, a settlement
- Dock, another name for Devonport, Plymouth, now a part of the city of Plymouth

== Science and technology ==
- Dock (macOS), the taskbar in the macOS operating system
- DOCK, molecular analysis software
- DOCK (protein), a family of proteins involved in cell signalling

== Other uses ==
- The Dock Gymnasium, Louisiana State University Shreveport, United States
- Docks (nightclub) in Hamburg, Germany
- The Docks Waterfront Entertainment Complex, Toronto, Ontario, Canada
- A courtroom dock, where an accused party sits during proceedings.
- To pierce dough during its handling to prevent the formation of large air pockets, such as with a roller docker

== See also ==
- Dry dock, a construction and repair facility for ships
- Floating dock (disambiguation), several different types of structures
- Loading dock, an area for trucks to deliver or receive cargo
- Space dock, used for the docking and berthing of spacecraft
- Docking (disambiguation)
- Dox (disambiguation)
- DOC (disambiguation)
- Docs (disambiguation)
- Dockx
- Hohe Dock, one of the highest peaks in the Glockner Group of the Austrian Alps
