= Docs =

Docs may refer to:

- Department of Community Services (DOCS), Australia
- New York State Department of Correctional Services (NYS DOCS, NYSDOCS, DOCS), USA
- Dimensional Obsessive-Compulsive Scale (DOCS), an obsessive-compulsive disorder assessment
- Display Operator Console System, the DOCS (software) package
- Docs.com, an MS Office sharing platform
- .docs, a top-level domain name (internet address) from Google
- Docs (software), a collaborative note taking, wiki and documentation platform
- Docs Cycling Team (UCI team code DCS), a UCI pro-cycling team
- Docs, colloquial term for Dr. Martens footwear.
- AFI Docs, a documentary film festival sponsored by AFI
- Google Docs, an online word processor from Google
- Microsoft Docs, a library of technical documentation from Microsoft
- Tennessee Docs football, University of Tennessee College of Medicine, University of Tennessee, Tennessee, USA; a football team and program
- Zoho Docs, collaboration software from Zoho
- Software documentation (docs)

== See also ==
- Doc's Pass, Doc's Pass Wilderness, Utah, USA
- DOC (disambiguation)
- Dock (disambiguation)
- Documentation (disambiguation)
- Dox (disambiguation)
