= Dox =

Dox or DOX may refer to:

== Chemistry ==
- Desferrioxamine, a chelating agent used to remove excess iron from the body
- Dissolved oxygen, a relative measure of the amount of oxygen that is dissolved or carried in a given medium
- Doxorubicin, an anthracycline antibiotic used in cancer therapy
- DOx, 2,5-dimethoxy, 4-substituted amphetamines
- Doxycycline, a semi-synthetic tetracycline
- Sodium dithionite (D-Ox)

== People ==
- Dox (poet), born Jean Verdi Salomon Razakandrainy (1913–1978), a significant poet from Madagascar
- Dox Hendrix (born 1959), U.S. pro-wrestler
- Dox Thrash (1893–1965), African-American artist

=== People with the surname ===
- Arthur Wayland Dox, a biologist who popularized Czapek-Dox medium
- Gerrit L. Dox (1784–1847), American politician, New York State Treasurer
- Myndert M. Dox (1790–1830), American soldier and government official
- Peter Myndert Dox (1813–1891), American politician
- Virginia Dox (1851–1941), American missionary, educator, and explorer

=== Characters ===
- Vril Dox, a DC Comics character
- Querl Dox, a DC Comics character
- General Dox, a character in the Marvel Cinematic Universe
- King Dox of Foxville, a character from the 1909 L. Frank Baum book The Road to Oz

== Places ==
- Dox, a white dwarf star named SDSS J1240+6710 which contains a nearly pure oxygen atmosphere
- Dox Formation, a Mesoproterozoic sandstone formation outcrop in the Grand Canyon
- Dox Castle, a summit in the Grand Canyon
- DOX Centre for Contemporary Art, Holešovice, Prague, Czechia

== Other uses ==
- Bussa language (ISO 639 language code dox), a language found in Ethiopia
- Dox, a type of Warez
- Dornier Do X, the German aircraft
- Direct oximetry
- Canid hybrid, a supposed hybrid between a fox and a dog
- Doxing, researching and publishing personally identifiable information about an individual without their consent
- Design of experiments, a statistical approach to experimental design

== See also ==
- Dock (disambiguation)
- Doc (disambiguation)
- Docs (disambiguation)
- Documentation (disambiguation)
