= Docking (surname) =

Docking is a surname. Notable people with the surname include:

- Alan Docking, founder of Alan Docking Racing
- Alfred Docking (1860–1938), missionary in the United States
- George Docking (1904–1964), politician in the U.S. state of Kansas
- Jeffrey Docking (born 1961), president of Adrian College in Michigan
- Jonathan Docking (born 1964), Australian rugby league footballer
- Robert Docking (1925–1983), politician in the U.S. state of Kansas
- Stanley Docking (1914−1940), English footballer
- Thomas Docking (1954-2017), politician in the U.S. state of Kansas
- Trevor Docking (born 1952), Australian cricketer
