= Docking =

Docking may refer to:

== In science and technology ==
- Docking and berthing of spacecraft, the process of joining one spacecraft or space station module to another
- Docking (molecular), a research technique for predicting the relative orientation of two molecules to each other
- Docking@Home, a distributed computing project
- Exscalate4Cov, a large-scale virtual screening experiment against COVID-19
- Docking, a synonym for accretion in geology

== Other uses ==
- The act of securing a ship or boat to a dock
- Docking (surname)
- Docking, Norfolk, a village
- Docking (animal), the practice of cutting off or trimming the tail of an animal
  - Docking (dog), the above practice as specifically applies to dogs
  - Docking, the similar mutilation of humans, e.g. as corporal punishment
- Docking, the piercing of dough as it is manipulated, sometimes with a tool such as a Roller docker
- Docking (sex), a sex act

== See also ==
- Dock (disambiguation)
- Docker (disambiguation)
