= Doctor (title) =

Academic title for a holder of a doctoral degree

Doctor is an academic title that originates from the Latin word of the same spelling. The word is originally an agentive noun of the Latin verb docēre [dɔˈkeːrɛ] 'to teach' and thus translates directly to teacher. It has been used as an academic title in Europe since the 13th century, when the first doctorates were awarded at the University of Bologna and the University of Paris.

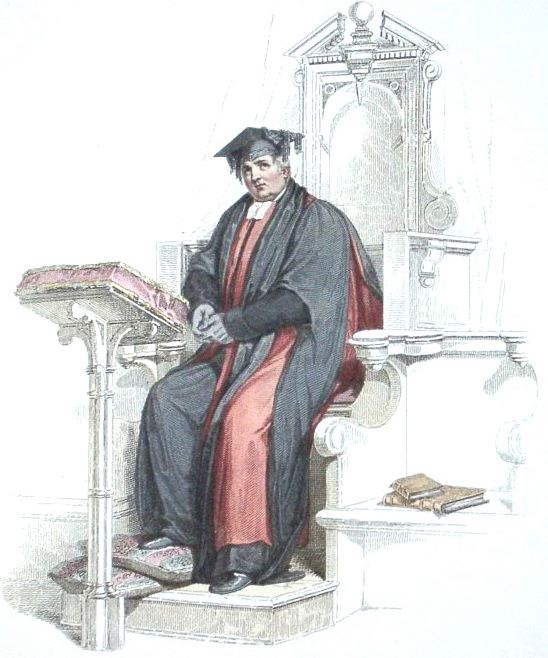
An Oxford Doctor of Divinity, in Convocation habit.

Having become established in European universities, this usage spread around the world. Contracted "Dr" or "Dr.", it is used as a designation for a person who has obtained a doctorate (commonly a PhD). In past usage, the term could be applied to any learned person. In many parts of the world today it is also used by medical practitioners, regardless of whether they hold a doctoral-level degree or not.

== Origins ==
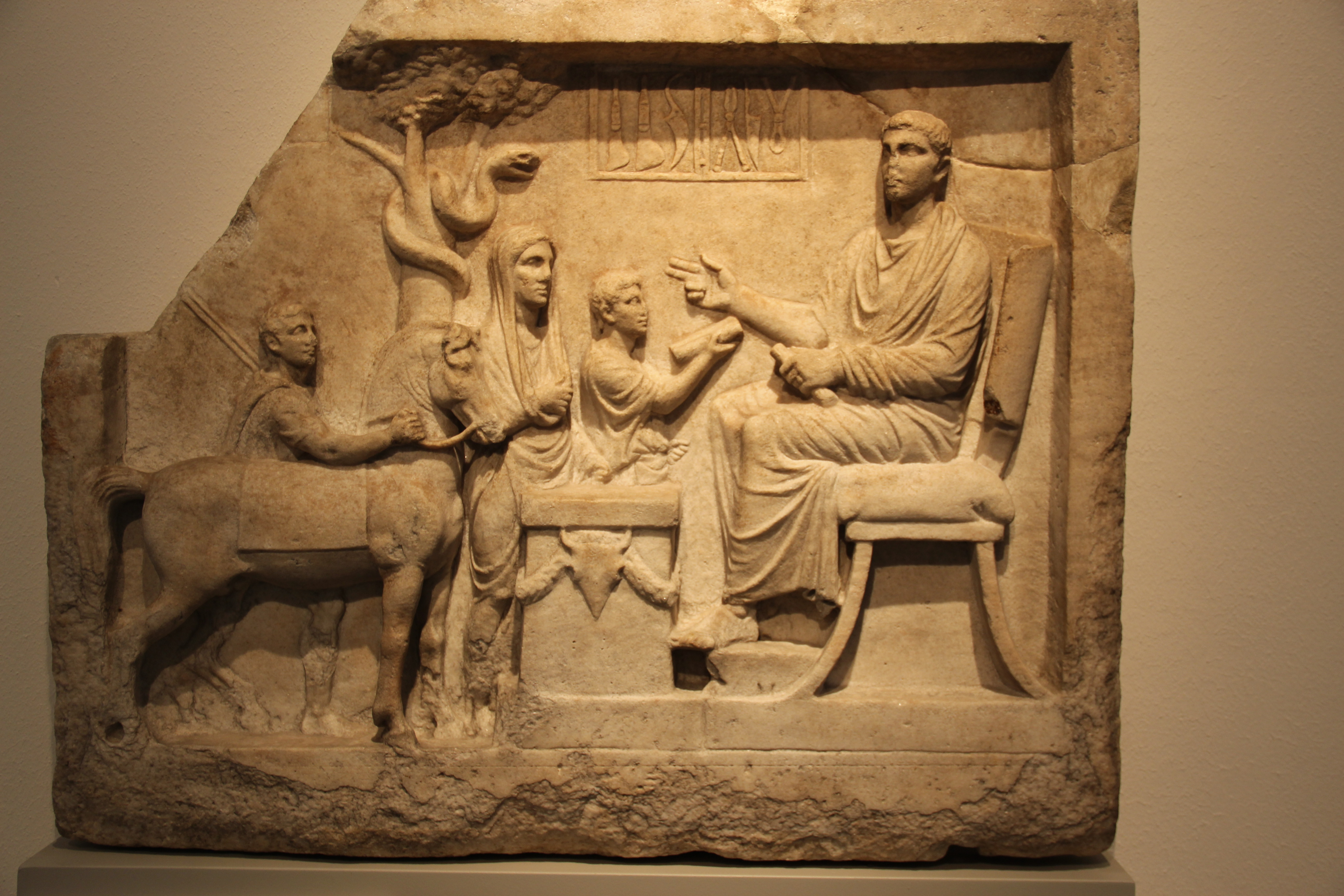
An Ancient Greek Marble Consecration Relief to a Heroic Doctor

The doctorate (Latin: doceō, lit. 'I teach') appeared in medieval Europe as a license to teach (licentia docendi) at a medieval university.

The roots of the term doctor can be traced to the early church, when the term "doctor" referred to the Apostles, Church Fathers and other Christian authorities who taught and interpreted the Bible.

The right to grant a licentia docendi was originally reserved to the church which required the applicant to pass a test, take an Oath of allegiance and pay a fee. The Third Council of the Lateran of 1179 guaranteed the access — now largely free of charge — of all able applicants, who were, however, still tested for aptitude by the ecclesiastic scholastic. This right remained a bone of contention between church authorities and the slowly emancipating universities, but was granted by the pope to the University of Paris in 1213, when it became a universal license to teach (licentia ubiquie docendi). However, while the licentia continued to hold more prestige than the bachelor's degree (Baccalaureus), it was eventually positioned below the magister and the doctorate, which became the only titles with which one could teach.

The earliest doctoral degrees — in theology, law, and medicine — reflected the historical separation of university study into these three fields. Over time, the Doctor of Divinity has become less common, whereas studies in law and medicine have become more common. These areas were historically referred to as "philosophy" (used as a general term for academic studies, not the specific academic discipline of philosophy), but are now classified as humanities and sciences, respectively. The historical usage survives in the degree of Doctor of Philosophy.

The Doctor of Philosophy was originally a degree granted by a university to learned individuals who had achieved the approval of their peers and who had demonstrated a long and productive career in the field of philosophy (in the broad sense of the term, meaning the pursuit of knowledge). The appellation "Doctor" (from Latin: teacher) was usually awarded only when the individual was in middle age. It indicated a life dedicated to learning, knowledge, and the spread of knowledge. The PhD entered widespread use in the 19th century at Friedrich Wilhelm University in Berlin as a degree to be granted to someone who had undertaken original research in the sciences or humanities. Prior to the formal degree, the contemporary doctorate (PhD), arguably, arose in Leipzig as a successor to the Master's degree in 1652 (Dr. habil).

In some European countries, such as Italy and Portugal, "Doctor" became a title given to all or most degree holders, not just those with doctorates. As a result, the title is now used by many professionals in these countries, including those such as lawyers who are not normally granted the title elsewhere. The title is also used for lawyers in South America, where they have traditionally earned doctoral degrees, as well as in the former Portuguese territories of Goa in India and Macau in China.

=== Development in English-speaking countries ===
The primary meaning of Doctor in English has historically been with reference to the holder of a doctoral degree. These particularly referred to the ancient faculties of divinity, law and medicine, sometimes with the addition of music, which were the only doctoral degrees offered until the 19th century. During the 19th century, PhDs became increasingly common in Britain, although to obtain the degree it was necessary to travel to continental Europe or (from 1861) to the United States, as the degree was not awarded in the UK until 1917.

However, the title, not being protected by law, was adopted by quacks. As a result, by the mid 19th century, it was normal in the UK to omit the title "Dr" when addressing letters to those holding doctoral degrees, and instead write the abbreviated form of the degree after the name, e.g., "The Reverend Robert Phelps, D.D.", "Thomas Elliotson, Esq. M.D.", or "John Lindsey, Esq. Ph.D.", in order to avoid classing academic doctors "with the village apothecary and the farrier" and various "quacks in literature, science, or art". In the US it similarly became customary to use post-nominals rather than the title of Doctor when addressing letters. All those with doctoral degrees continued to use the title professionally and socially.

Despite being historically associated with doctorates in law, the title of doctor for lawyers has not customarily been used in English-speaking countries, where lawyers were traditionally not required to have a university degree and were trained by other lawyers by apprenticeship or in the Inns of Court. The exception being those areas where, up to the 19th century, civil law rather than common law was the governing tradition, including admiralty law, probate and ecclesiastical law: such cases were heard in the Doctor's Commons, and argued by advocates who held degrees either of doctor of civil law at Oxford or doctor of law at Cambridge. As such, lawyers practicing common law in England were not doctoral candidates and had not earned a doctorate. When university degrees became more common for those wanting to qualify as a lawyer in England, the degree awarded was the Bachelor of Laws (LLB). Similarly in the US, even though degrees became standard for lawyers much earlier, the degree was again the LLB, only becoming the Juris Doctor (JD) generally in the latter half of the 20th century.

In many English-speaking countries, it is common to refer to physicians by the title of doctor, even when they do not hold a doctoral level qualification. The word Doctor has long had a secondary meaning in English of physician, e.g., in Johnson's Dictionary, which quotes its use with this meaning by Shakespeare. In the US, the medical societies established the proprietary medical colleges in the 19th century to award their own MDs, but in the UK and the British Empire, where degree granting was strictly controlled, this was not an option. The usage of the title to refer to medical practitioners, even when they did not hold doctoral degrees, was common by the mid 18th century. However, the first official recognition of Doctor being applied as a title to medical practitioners regardless of whether they held a doctoral degree was in 1838, when the Royal College of Physicians resolved that it would "regard in the same light, and address by the same appellation, all who have obtained its diploma, whether they have graduated elsewhere or not."

The Medical Act 1858 made it illegal for anyone not qualified in medicine to use a title that implied they were. This led to prosecutions of people making unauthorised use of the title "Dr". However, it also called into question the use of the title by licentiates of the Colleges of Physicians – all of whom were, under the new act, allowed to practice throughout the UK. In 1859, the London College reversed its earlier decision, resolving "That the title of Doctor shall not be given in any official document issued from this College to any person who is not possessed of the Degree of Doctor of Medicine". This was followed up in 1860 by new bylaws that stated "No Fellow, Member, or Licentiate of the College shall assume the title of Doctor of Medicine, or use any other name, title, designation or distinction implying that he is a Graduate in Medicine of an University, unless he be a Graduate in Medicine of an University". In Ireland, the question of whether the license of the Royal College of Physicians of Ireland granted the title of Doctor of Medicine led to a court case in 1861, with the conclusion that it did not. The British Medical Journal (BMJ) observed, however, that anyone wanting the right to the title of "Doctor" could gain it "with a five-shilling degree of Doctor of Philosophy" from abroad, or could simply assume the title, as only "Doctor of Medicine" was actually protected. Debate continued as to the use of "Doctor" as a courtesy title by those who did not use it by right as holders of doctoral degrees, with the BMJ noting in 1876 that "We have again a sort of flood of letters for and against the use of the title of Doctor by physicians" and in 1882 that "There is not any other subject which appears to excite so wide spread an interest as this". In February 1876, a report recommended that the Royal College of Physicians should use the courtesy title of Doctor for all fellows and members, but this was rejected. Then in April of the same year, the college amended its bylaws to forbid any fellow, member, extra-licentiate or licentiate from using the title of Doctor unless they had a doctorate in medicine from a recognised university – closing the loophole the BMJ had identified. It was not until the early 20th century that this was reversed. In 1905 the Royal College of Surgeons passed a motion instructing their council "to take the necessary steps in conjunction with the Royal College of Physicians to ensure that all persons who pass the Conjoint examination shall be legally entitled to call themselves Doctors". The council of the surgeons' College felt it to be impractical to secure the legal right to the title as this would mean gaining the right to award MDs, but noted that the title had been used by the public to refer to medics for generations and was used without any legal right by Bachelors of Medicine – the only obstacle to licentiates of both colleges doing the same was the prohibition in the physicians' bylaws. On this occasion the College of Physicians refused to act, but they did finally relent in 1912, removing the clause forbidding the assumption of the title of Doctor. This was described in the American press as "the British apostles of red-tape have been forced to bow to the popular will".

Regulation of the medical profession also took place in the United States in the latter half of the 19th century, preventing quacks from using the title of Doctor. However, medical usage of the title was far from exclusive, with it being acknowledged that other doctorate holders could use the title and that dentists and veterinarians frequently did. The Etiquette of To-day, published in 1913, recommended addressing letters to physicians "(full name), M.D." and those to other people holding doctorates "Dr. (full name)", although both were "Dr." in the salutation and only physicians were explicitly said to include their title on their visiting card. By the 1920s there were a great variety of doctorates in the US, many of them taking entrants directly from high school, and ranging from the Doctor of Chiropractic (DC), which (at the time) required only two or three years of college-level education, (Note: The requirements for the DC are higher in the modern era, typically needing four years of bachelor's-level pre-medical training for entry followed by a four to five year professional course) up to the PhD. All doctoral degree holders, with the exception of the JD, were customarily addressed as "Doctor", but the title was also regularly used, without doctoral degrees, by pharmacists, ministers of religion, teachers and chiropodists, and sometimes by other professions such as beauty practitioners, patent medicine manufacturers, etc.

By the 1940s, the widespread usage of the title in the US was under threat. A 1944 article claimed that "the Ph.D. has immediate and far-reaching value of social as well as economic nature" due to America's "national fondness for the tinsel of titles", but went on to note that some universities were moving away from using the title, concluding that "it is ungracious in most environments not to render unto the Doctor of Philosophy his 'Doctor' title". The same writer noted in a letter to the Journal of Higher Education in 1948 that Alfred University had banned the use of the title for faculty (while retaining it for the president and deans) "in a strange move professedly designed to uphold and promote 'democracy' and 'Americanism'". However, it was noted in 1959 that professors with PhDs were now generally addressed as "Doctor", with the title of "Professor" sometimes being substituted for those without doctorates, leading to a decline in the perceived value of that title. In the 1960s the inconsistent usage at American universities and colleges was mentioned in the New York Times Book Review and the editor of Science noted that: "In some universities, administrators call all Ph.D.'s 'Mister,' but students and colleagues call them 'Doctor.' Often, but not always, Ph.D.'s are 'Misters' socially. In industry and government, both socially and professionally, they are 'Doctors,' as they are also in the pages of the New Yorker, Time, the Saturday Review, and the New York Times." In 1965, the League of Women Voters designated MDs "Dr." and PhDs "Mr." at a hustings in Princeton, leading to a letter of protest in Science; it was reported that the League believed PhDs would be embarrassed by the title, and that etiquette writers differed in whether PhDs used the title. In 1970, reverse snobbism in the face of the rising number of "discount doctorates" was linked to professors at prestigious universities wanting to be called "mister".

In the late 1960s the rising number of American law schools awarding Juris Doctor (JD) degrees led to debate over whether lawyers could ethically use the title "Doctor". Initial informal ethics opinions, based on the Canons of Professional Ethics then in force, came down against this. These were then reinforced with a full ethics opinion that maintained the ban on using the title in legal practice as a form of self-laudation (except when dealing with countries where the use of "Doctor" by lawyers was standard practice), but allowed the use of the title in academia "if the school of graduation thinks of the J.D. degree as a doctor's degree". These opinions led to further debate. The introduction of the new Code of Professional Responsibility in 1969 seemed to settle the question – in states where this was adopted – in favour of allowing the use of the title. There was some dispute over whether only the PhD-level Doctor of Juridical Science should properly be seen as granting the title, but ethics opinions made it clear that the new Code allowed JD-holders to be called "Doctor", while reaffirming that the older Canons did not. As not all state bars adopted the new Code, and some omitted the clause permitting the use of the title, confusion over whether lawyers could ethically use the title "Doctor" continued. The introduction of further professional doctorates in the US at ISCED level 7, the same as the MD and JD, has led to continuing debate about the use of the title by holders of such degrees, particularly in medical contexts.

In 2018, a decision by The Globe and Mail newspaper in Canada to update its style guide so as to restrict the use of the title Doctor to medics led to a backlash on Twitter, particularly by women with PhDs, using the #ImmodestWomen hashtag. This was widely reported on internationally and led to The Globe and Mail reverting to its earlier style of using Doctor for both physicians and PhD holders. The Canadian University of Calgary also announced that it would adopt the use of Doctor for those with doctoral degrees, breaking with the style recommended by the Canadian Press.

== Doctor as a noun ==
Throughout much of the academic world, the term Doctor refers to someone who has earned a doctoral degree (highest degree) from a university. This is normally the Doctor of Philosophy, abbreviated PhD (sometimes Ph.D. in North America) from the Latin Philosophiae Doctor or DPhil from its English name, or equivalent research doctorates at level 8 of the International Standard Classification of Education 2011 classifications (ISCED 2011) or level 6 of the ISCED 1997 classifications. Beyond academia (but specifically in the anglophone world, Italy, and France), Doctor as a noun normally refers to a physician, who would usually hold a qualification at level 7 of ISCED 2011/level 5 of ISCED 1997 such as the British MBBS or the American MD or DO.

== Forms of address ==
When addressing several people, each of whom holds a doctoral title, one may use the plural contraction "Drs" (or "Drs." in American English) – or in some languages (for example, German) "Dres." (from the Latin doctores) may be used – for example, instead of Dr. Miller and Dr. Ahmed: Drs. Miller and Ahmed. When referring to relatives with the same surname the form "The Doctors Smith" can be used. The abbreviation Drs. can also refer to doctorandus, a Dutch academic title that was replaced with the master title with the introduction of the master system.

In English, Dr is not usually combined with other titles, except for The Reverend in "The Revd Dr" before the surname of a minister of religion, e.g., "The Revd Dr Smith" or "The Revd John Smith, DD", and similarly "Rabbi Dr". In Caribbean English, the usage "Dr. the Honourable" is common for politicians holding doctoral degrees. Usage in many other languages is similar to English but some, notably German, allow for the stacking of titles.

== Usage by medical practitioners in the UK and culturally related countries ==
In the United Kingdom, India, Pakistan, Hong Kong, Trinidad and Tobago, South Africa, Australia, New Zealand, Ghana, and other countries whose cultures were recently linked to the UK, the title Dr is generally used both for those who hold doctoral degrees and for registered medical practitioners. History has dictated the use of the courtesy title Dr by physicians and general practitioners. However, surgeons do not use the title of Dr and, due to the origins of surgery with the barber surgeons, instead use Mr, Mrs, Ms, Miss, etc. This custom applies to surgeons of any grade who have passed the appropriate exams and is not the exclusive province of consultant-level surgeons. In recent times, other surgically orientated specialists, such as gynaecologists, have also adopted these prefixes. A surgeon who is also a professor is usually known as "Professor" and, similarly, a surgeon who has been ennobled, knighted, created a baronet or appointed a dame uses the corresponding title (Lord, Sir, Dame). Physicians, on the other hand, when they pass their "MRCP(UK)" examinations, or equivalent, do not drop Dr but retain it, even as consultants. The status and rank of consultant surgeons, addressed as "Mister" or "Ms.", and consultant physicians, addressed as "Doctor", is equivalent.

== Worldwide usage ==
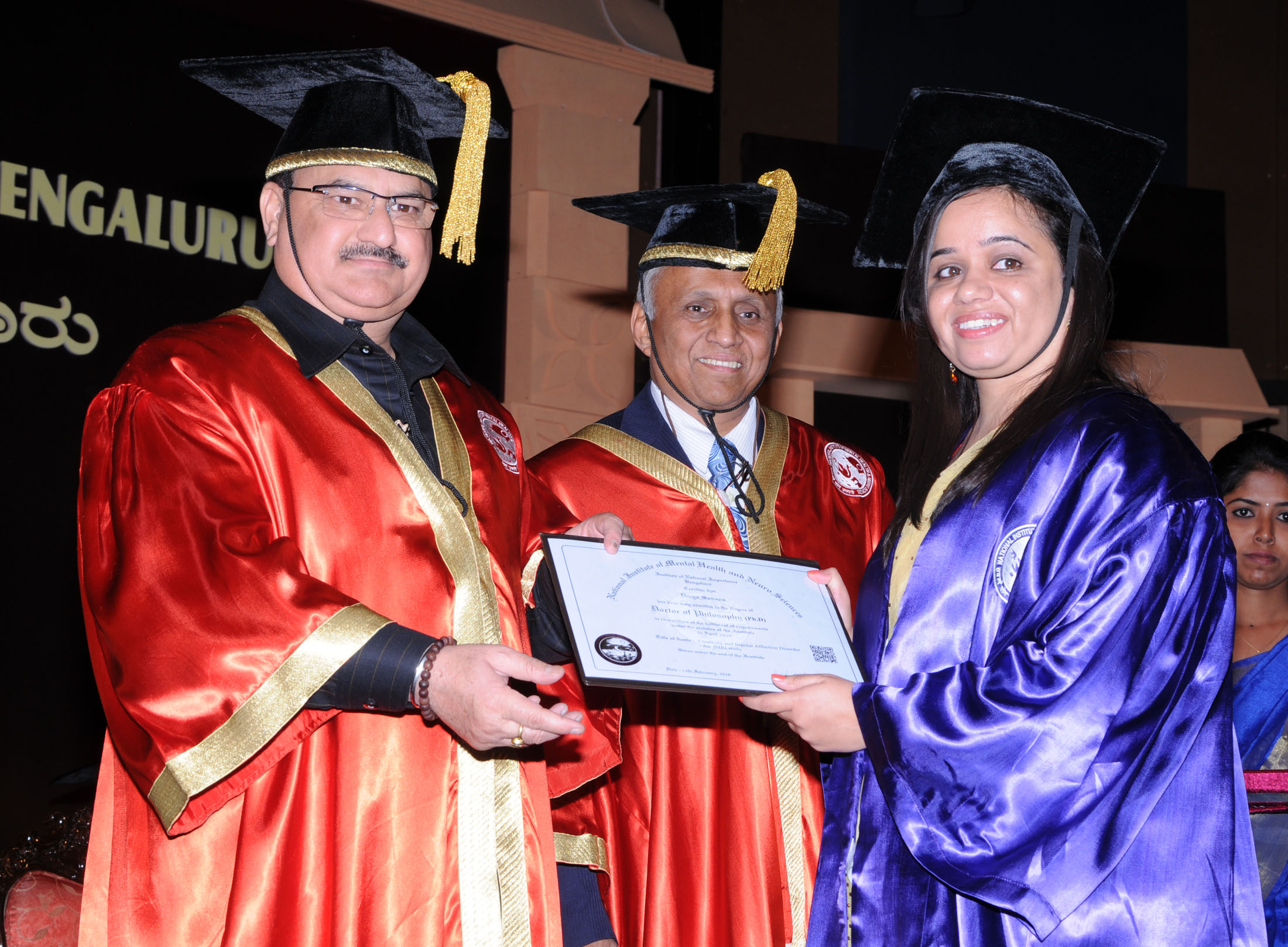
A doctor receiving her PhD degree during a graduation ceremony

=== Asia ===
==== Bangladesh ====
In Bangladesh, use of the title of doctor (or Dr) is permitted for PhD degree holders and registered medical practitioners. For registered medical practitioners, only MBBS and BDS degree holders are allowed to use the title and be called "medical doctors". Registered veterinary practitioners may use the title after earning a Doctor of Veterinary Medicine (DVM) degree. However, registered homeopathic practitioners also use the title of doctor even though, according to the Homeopathic Practitioners Ordinance 1983, they are only permitted to use "homeopath" But Bangladesh Homeopathic Practitioners Ordinance 2023, repealing the Ordinance Act of 1983, allows the practice of writing as a doctor.Article 3, Section 21(3). There is currently no separate council or parliamentary act for professionals holding alternative MBBS/BDS degrees (Alternative System of Medicine). However, according to an interim order of the High Court, until the formation of a separate council or legal framework, MBBS(AS)/BDS(AS) graduates are temporarily permitted to use the title “Doctor.” Physiotherapy has no separate council and no act of parliament at present permits the use of the title for physiotherapist, but the High Court has given an interim order that permits physiotherapy graduates to use the title, pending the formation of a separate council. According to the Bangladesh Unani & Ayurvedic Practitioners Ordinance 1983, practitioners of the Unani system are called "Tabib" or "Hakim" and practitioners of Ayurvedic system are called "Vaid" or "Kabiraj"; both are prohibited from using the title of doctor. Currently, medical practitioners having an MBBS degree or dental surgeons having a BDS are legally permitted to use Dr as a prefix; its use by other medical practitioners remains controversial.

==== Hong Kong ====
Hong Kong follows British practice in calling physicians "Doctor" even though many of them hold only a degree of Bachelor of Medicine and Bachelor of Surgery (MBBS or MBChB). An attempt by their professional body to prevent chiropractors from calling themselves "Doctor" failed in the courts, in part because it was pointed out that practicing chiropractors may hold an academic doctorate in their discipline, and it would be anomalous to prevent them using the title when holders of doctorates in non-medical disciplines faced no such restriction.

==== India ====
In India, medical practitioners are legally referred to as registered medical practitioners. The title of doctor is frequently used by qualified professional medical practitioners in the fields of Allopathic medicine (MBBS) and dentistry (BDS), as well as by other practitioners like Siddha (BSMS), Yoga and Naturopathy (BNYS), Ayurveda (BAMS), Unani medicine (BUMS) and Homeopathy(BHMS), Veterinarians (BVSc) and holders of doctoral degrees, including PhDs and pharmacists with PharmDs. Physiotherapists (BPT) are permitted by NCAHP to prefix 'Dr.' with 'P.T.' as a suffix.

The usage by pharmacists is legally disputed. There is also ambiguity over the use of "Dr." as a prefix by physiotherapists. In September 2025, this use was formally banned by the Directorate General of Health Services, but this ban was rescinded on the following day.

==== Indonesia ====
The Indonesian titles "dr." is used in front of the name of medical doctor who holds a specification as general practitioner, also when the doctor already holds his specialization to ___, such as "Sp.THT" or "Spesialis Telinga, Hidung, Tenggorokan" (ENT or Ear, Nose, and Throat Specialist).

Dr. is used in front of the name as the title "Doktor" for doctorate title, the same level as PhD title.

==== Pakistan ====
In Pakistan, the title of Doctor (Dr.) can be used by PhD degree holders as well as medical, dental, optometry and veterinary doctors with MBBS, BDS, OD and DVM degrees respectively. Usage by physiotherapists DPT degree respectively is disputed, with the Pakistan Medical and Dental Council saying they should not use the title, but the Pharmacy Council of Pakistan (the regulatory body for pharmacists) and the Higher Education Commission permitting and encouraging its use.

==== Philippines ====
In the Philippines, titles and names of occupations usually follow Spanish naming conventions which utilize gender-specific terms. "Doktór" is the masculine form, which retains the abbreviation Dr.; the feminine form is "Doktóra", and is abbreviated usually as "Dra."; others, however, some being Anglophones who wish to sound modern and Westernised (or were raised in an almost exclusively English-speaking family environment), or some who advocate gender equality, would dispense with the distinction altogether. There does exist in Filipino an equivalent, gender-neutral term for the professional that carries the more general notion of "healer", traditional (for example, an albuláryo) or otherwise: manggagámot. Contracted "Dr" or "Dr.", it is also used as a designation for a person who has obtained a doctoral degree (e.g. PhD, EdD, DPA).

==== Sri Lanka ====
In Sri Lanka the title doctor "Dr." is used for PhD holders and medical practitioner such as physicians, surgeons, dental surgeons and veterinarians. However, when addressing in native Sinhalese a medical practitioner is addressed as "Vaidya" (වෛද්ය) or "Dosthara" (දොස්තර) while a PhD holder is addressed as "Aacharya" (ආචාර්ය). It is a common practice for married female medical practitioners to use the title "Dr (Mrs)" in a both professional and social capacity.

==== Thailand ====
The usage of Doctor (ดอกเตอร์) or Dr (ดร.) has been borrowed from English. It can be seen as a title in academic circles and in the mass media. In contrast to other academic titles (Professor, Associate Professor and assistant professor), the use of Doctor as a title has not been recognized by the Royal Institute of Thailand. Therefore, this title, in theory, cannot be used officially. For example, in court of justice where strictly formal Thai language is used, Dr cannot be mentioned as a person's title.

=== The Americas ===
==== Brazil ====
The 'doctor' title is used by individuals holding a PhD degree. 'Doctor' is also used as a deferential title in Brazilian Portuguese. The title “Doctor” can also be used in Brazil to address medics and lawyers by the law since the imperial times. The law was enacted by the second Brazilian emperor, Dom Pedro II, to attract more medics and lawyers from other countries in imperial times when there was very few practitioners of both professions in the country for the crescent population of that time. The law still is enacted.

==== Canada ====
Canada lies somewhere between British and American usage of the degree and terminology of "doctor". Holders of research doctorates – PhDs and similar degrees – commonly use the title "doctor". A number of regulated healthcare professionals can also use the title "doctor"; in Ontario these are limited by law (in the provision of health care) to physicians, dentists, optometrists, chiropractors, doctorate-level psychologists and social workers who are members of the relevant Ontario college. In Alberta, Registered Nurses or Nurse Practitioners with an earned doctoral degree may use the title "doctor" in conjunction with professional practice. Some professionals earn degrees with the title of doctor but which are considered, despite their name, to be at bachelor's-level, e.g. DDS, MD, JD. In Ontario, registered naturopathic doctors may only use the title "doctor" in written format if they also use the phrase, "naturopathic doctor" immediately following their name, while a 2006 amendment that would allow practitioners of Traditional Chinese Medicine to use the title has not, as of 1 August 2016, entered into force. As of 2022, in Alberta, Doctors of Acupuncture may use the doctor title.

===== Quebec =====
The usage of the French Docteur and Docteure, and their abbreviated forms Dr, Dre, D^{r} and D^{re}, is controlled by the Code des professions. As a pre-nominal title it can be used without any further explication by physicians, veterinarians, and dentists. It can also be used prenominally, when accompanied by the name of the profession immediately after the name, by professionals who require a doctorate for their professional licence, such as psychology, and chiropractic, e.g. Dr X, psychologue or Dr Y, chiropraticien. Academic doctors, where the doctorate is not required to practice, bear the title only after their name; this is not abbreviated, e.g. M. Z, docteur en philosophie not M. Z, PhD

==== United States ====
In the United States, the use of the title "Doctor" is dependent upon the setting. The title is commonly used socially by physicians and those holding doctoral degrees; however, there was formerly a division between Letitia Baldrige and Miss Manners on its social usage by those who are not physicians. Baldrige saw this usage as acceptable, while in contrast, Miss Manners wrote that "only people of the medical profession correctly use the title of doctor socially," but supports those who wish to use it in social contexts in the spirit of addressing people according to their wishes. Miss Manners has since softened her approach, noting in her The Washington Post column that there are two approaches: "having been earned, it should be used" and "that level of education being assumed, it need not be expressly mentioned"; while she maintains that everyone should be addressed according to their wishes, she no longer states that only medical professionals use the title correctly but instead acknowledges that the title has been earned by those with PhDs. The Emily Post Institute similarly advises that "Socially as well as professionally, medical doctors, dentists, and other professionals are addressed by, and introduced with, their titles. People who have earned a Ph.D. or any other academic, nonmedical doctoral degree have the choice of whether to use "Dr." both professionally and socially." Other advice columns have also noted that "it has become common to see someone with a Ph.D. addressed on the envelope as Dr., and as a consequence, deviation from convention has become acceptable." The 2017 book Etiquette Rules! gives identical forms for addressing a "doctor of medicine (MD), dental surgery (DDS), veterinary medicine (DVM), etc.", and the holder of a PhD, advising in both cases the use of initials after the name for formal correspondence and Dr. before the name for social correspondence. Although the usage of the title by Ph.D. graduates has become common, its use socially by holders of professional doctorates (other than those noted) is neither explicitly endorsed nor explicitly discouraged by writers on etiquette. Miss Manners has, however, stated that a physician who has had their license revoked should be addressed by their former preferred honorific (i.e. not according to their MD degree). It is unusual for those who hold honorary doctorates to use the title "Doctor".

Publications from the office of the President of the United States of America also refer to PhD holders as Dr. So-and-so, and Jill Biden, who holds an EdD, used the style "Dr. Jill Biden" as second lady and continued to do so as first lady. For addresses (defined as "the conventional forms of address as determined by social and official custom"), NASA uses "Dr. (full name)" in addresses for PhD holders while for physicians it uses "(full name), MD", although both are addressed as "Dr. (surname)" in the salutation (which is described as "informal"). The National Institutes of Health similarly use "Dr. (surname)" in salutations for people with an MD, PhD or DDS. They advise using full name followed by degrees in addresses, explicitly stating not to use the title "Dr.", although an example in the following paragraph does use the title rather than giving degrees.

Most newspapers in the US follow the AP Stylebook and reserve the title for physicians in their house styles; notable exceptions include The New York Times, which follows the preference of the individual when referring to PhD holders (although the title is not used for those with honorary doctorates), and The Wall Street Journal, which similarly prefers "Dr." for PhD holders and physicians (if this is the person's choice) while stating explicitly that the title is not used for lawyers with JDs or people with honorary doctorates. Until 1989, The Washington Post used the title for "practitioners of the healing arts (including chiropractors and osteopaths) but not for holders of PhDs or honorary degrees", after which it dropped its use entirely. Some sources state that AP style allows the use of Dr. for holders of non-medical doctoral degrees as long as their speciality is given.

The expansion of professional doctorates in clinical fields in the late 20th and early 21st centuries has led to disputes between physicians and other medical professions over who can use the title in a clinical context. This has been interpreted by some as part of larger battles within medicine, such as who gets to treat patients first and who has prescribing authority. The American Medical Association calls for non-physicians (those not holding an MD or DO) who use the title "Doctor" and are in direct contact with patients to clarify that they are not physicians and to "define the nature of their doctorate", while the American Osteopathic Association opposes the use of the title by non-physicians in clinical settings absolutely as (in their view) "such use deceives the public". Contrary to this, the Emergency Nurses Association has adopted as a position statement that "1. Nurses are entitled to have their educational degrees recognized and acknowledged in the same manner as other professions. 2. The proper title protection and use of accurate credentials is appropriate in the clinical setting. 3. When being addressed or introduced as doctor in the clinical environment, it is responsible practice for all healthcare providers to clarify their professional role. 4. Patients, families and the general public have a right and expectation to be informed regarding the credentials of their caregivers, including the use of the title "doctor"."

The American Medical Association launched a campaign in 2011 for states to adopt "truth in advertising" legislation. As a result, many states now have laws in place that protect the title of doctor when offering medical services. In some jurisdictions, the use of the title in health care is limited to those who have both a doctorate and are licensed to practice medicine, and there is a requirement that the field of the doctorate be disclosed. Some other jurisdictions require the practitioner to hold a doctorate and to disclose the field, but make no stipulations as to licensing. Some states require name badges to be worn in medical facilities giving first name, licensure status, and staff position, although these laws may not explicitly address the use of the title "Doctor".

Although lawyers in the United States do not customarily use the title, the law degree in that country is the Juris Doctor, a professional doctorate. Some JD holders in the United States use the title of doctor in professional situations, although ethics board decisions have varied on whether this is permissible or might mislead the public into believing the lawyer was medically qualified or had a PhD. It is also sometimes used by JD holders in academic situations. In 2011, Mother Jones published an article claiming that Michele Bachmann was misrepresenting her qualifications by using the "bogus" title Dr. based on her JD. The article was later amended to note that the use of the title by lawyers "is a (begrudgingly) accepted practice in some states and not in others", although they maintained that it was rarely used as it "suggests that you're a medical doctor or a Ph.D.—and therefore conveys a false level of expertise".

Ecclesiastical seminaries and entitled churches award their own doctorates in the United States, e.g. the Doctor of Religious Science (Dr. sc. rel.), the Doctor of Divinity (DD), the Doctor of Biblical Studies (DBS) or the Doctor of Metaphysics (Dr. mph.). These titles are most commonly awarded to meritorious clerics for their outstanding work or another achievement in the field of religious and biblical studies.

American professional doctorates are not generally considered doctoral level degrees internationally, instead being classified as bachelor's or master's level. The ISCED mapping for these degrees, developed collaboratively between the US and UNESCO, places them at master's level. As a result, holders of MD, JD, PharmD, etc. may not be permitted to use the title of Doctor in countries such as Germany where this is strictly controlled.

=== Europe ===
In the European Union, the title of doctor refers primarily to holders of post-graduate research doctorates, such as the PhD. In many European languages the term doctor is distinct from a medical practitioner, which can be referred to as e.g. läkare in Swedish, Arzt in German, dokter or arts in Dutch, or lääkäri in Finnish.

Standardisation of degrees into the three cycles of bachelor's–master's–doctorate across the European Higher Education Area (EHEA) is being carried out through the Bologna process, although not all EHEA member states have fully conformed to the 1999 Bologna declaration in favour of their own historic customs. With respect to the title "doctor", the Bologna process makes no prescriptions regarding the names of degrees nor the titles they may confer. However, under the Lisbon Recognition Convention, recognition of a foreign degree allows "the use of an academic title, subject to the laws and regulations of the country in which recognition is sought". According to the Explanatory report, this means that: "The competent authorities of the Parties may grant the right to use the title in the exact form in which it was awarded in the Party concerned or in any other form. They may alternatively grant the right to use the corresponding title of the country in which recognition is sought."

==== Austria ====
In Austria, the degree Doktor is granted to holders of research degrees (ISCED 8) with a denoting Latin particle being added (Dr. techn., Dr. phil., Dr. rer. nat., Dr.iur., Dr.theol. etc.). Newer study programmes award a PhD, but these exist alongside the older degrees since many prefer obtaining a Dr. to a PhD. These degrees take 3–4 years full-time and are organised in doctoral schools.

In addition, the academic degree Doktor (ISCED 7) is granted to physicians (Dr. med. univ.) and dentists (Dr. med. dent.), who since 2002 do not obtain doctoral degrees (ISCED 8) but instead follow a master's level six-year training (360 ECTS) programme, similar to an American MD or DDS. For these degrees, students have to write a Diplomarbeit thesis of 50-100 pages. Research doctorates in medicine (Dr. scient. med. or PhD) can also be obtained after a three-year full-time post-graduate study programme at a medical university.

All doctors may be addressed as "Doktor _____"; the title is usually contracted to "Dr. _____", oftentimes they are just addressed as "Herr/Frau Doktor" (Mr/Ms Doctor), omitting the family name unless they are being introduced to someone.

Contrary to popular belief in the country, the title "Dr." is not part of a person's name or a specific honour but simply a degree like BSc/BA, Mag (MA/MSc) or Dipl.-Ing. (MEng). It is not mandatory to use it, although it may be added to official documents (e.g. driver's licence, passport), if desired.

==== Finland ====
In Finland, the title of tohtori or doktor denotes holder of a research doctorate comparable to a PhD. Getting the doctorate requires advanced studies after the master's degree, writing a thesis, nowadays often a thesis by publication, and publicly defending the thesis. Customary doctorates do not exist even in the field of medicine: physicians hold the degree of lääketieteen lisensiaatti (Licentiate of Medicine), and are referred to simply as lääkäri (physician); "tohtori" would be rustic or old-fashioned. A research doctorate in medicine, lääketieteen tohtori, requires further research work and a separate doctoral thesis, and is not taken by all medical graduates. Regardless, in Finnish usage, the use of titles is uncommon and restricted to only the most formal of contexts.

==== France ====
In France, the title of Docteur is only used generally for physicians (médecin) but can also be used by holders of research doctorates. Medical professionals do not normally hold a doctorate, which in France always refers to a research doctorate, but a "State Diploma of Doctor of Medicine" (Diplôme d'État de docteur en médecine).

The law in France allows the title of Dr to be used professionally by holders of research doctorates, with the field of their speciality being mentioned after the name. The courts have ruled that stating the specialisation is not necessary except in circumstances specifically related to professional practice; at other times the title alone may be used. The courts have also determined that questioning the right of the holder of a research doctorate to use the title Dr is a form of libel. The National Union of Hospital Scientists (Syndicat National des Scientifiques Hospitaliers) launched a campaign in 2015 to raise awareness of the right of scientists to use the title.

==== Germany ====
In German language-speaking countries, the word Doktor refers to a doctorate awardee in formal language (similar to a PhD). It is distinct from Arzt, since a doctoral degree is not a requirement for medical practitioners, though colloquial use of the word Doktor for physician is common and ordinary people often incorrectly assume that only Doktors may practice medicine. For this reason, 80% of all students in medicine write "doctoral" dissertations, often comparable to a master's thesis in science, alongside their undergraduate studies to obtain a Dr. med. degree. The European Research Council decided in 2010 that those Dr. med. doctorates do not meet the international standards of a PhD research degree.

In Germany, the most common doctoral degrees are Dr. med. (medicine), Dr. med. dent. (dentistry), Dr. med. vet. (veterinary medicine), Dr. rer. nat. (natural sciences), Dr. phil. (humanities), Dr. iur. (law), Dr. rer. pol. (economic and political sciences, also as Dr. rer. oec. in Switzerland), Dr.-Ing. (engineering), and Dr. theol. (theology). All holders of doctoral degrees are appropriately addressed as "Herr/Frau Dr. _____" in all social situations.

In Germany, double doctorates are indicated in the title by "Dr. Dr." or "DDr." and triple doctorates as "Dr. Dr. Dr." or "DDDr." More doctorates are indicated by the addition of "mult.", such as "Dr. mult." Honorary titles are shown with the addition of "h.c.", which stands for "honoris causa". Example: "Dr. h.c. mult." Some honorary titles are shown by addition of German equivalents of "h.c.", like "e.h.", "E.h.", or "eh.", which stand for "ehrenhalber" (honorary). Example: "Dr. e.h. mult."

All people holding a doctorate from an EU member state are, since 2001, entitled to use "Doctor" or "Dr." in all formal, legal and published communications without any further addenda. For academics with doctorates from non-EU member states, the qualification must be recognised formally ("validated") by the Federal Educational Ministry in Bonn. The recognition process can be done by the employer or employee and may be part of the official bureaucracy for confirming professional status and is dependent on individual bilateral agreements between Germany and other countries and, since 2007, the Lisbon Recognition Convention. An example of mutual recognition of Doctor titles among EU countries is the "Bonn Agreement of November 14, 1994", signed between Germany and Spain (prior to the general recognition of EU doctorates).

In 2008, The Standing Conference of the Ministers of Education and Cultural Affairs of the Länder in the Federal Republic of Germany extended their 2001 decision to recognise EU PhDs to cover PhDs that were awarded in Australia, Israel, Japan, Canada, and some American universities. It was announced in 2012 that this would be further extended to cover PhDs awarded in New Zealand. PhDs that were awarded in the United States are recognized if the awarding institution is classified by the Carnegie Foundation for the Advancement of Teaching as a "Research University (high research activity)" or as a "Research University (very high research activity)." Permission to use the title covers only scientific research degrees and does not extend to professional degrees such as the MD or JD.

==== Greece ====
In Greece, doctor "Διδάκτωρ" (didáktor) is indicated in the title as Δρ and it is used for holders of doctoral degrees. Other alternative names are also used, namely «δόκτωρ» and «δόκτορας», derived from the French "docteur". The term "Ιατρός" (iatrós) indicates medical practitioners.

==== Hungary ====
In Hungary, graduates of six-year medical schools (dr. med.), five-year dentistry schools (dr. med. dent.), five-year law schools (dr. jur.) and five-year veterinary medical schools (dr. vet.) receive the title of a doctor at the end of their studies, after completing and successfully defending their thesis; their undergraduate studies must have lasted for a minimum of three years. Completing a PhD research programme (or DLA in arts and music) also leads to the doctor title. Since 2008, also those who graduated of five-year pharmacy schools have the right to use the title "dr" (dr. pharm.).

A large part of Hungarians with doctor titles received their titles for research in the old academic system before PhD was introduced in Hungary. Since the introduction of PhD title (1993), the dr. univ title (given before 1993). The CSc Candidate of Science title was a scientific title in the old academic system and is now treated as an equivalent of PhD. CSc titles were awarded by the Hungarian Academy of Sciences.

The highest level doctoral degree in Hungary is DSc Doctor of Sciences, awarded by the Hungarian Academy of Sciences. It is also called Doctor of the Hungarian Academy of Sciences.

The title of doctor used to become a part of the name and was added as such to personal identity documents. This practice is still common and graduates after receiving their diploma would usually change their personal documents in order to officially indicate the achievement.

==== Ireland ====
Usage in Ireland is similar to that in the UK. The title of doctor is used for holders of doctoral degrees as well as for medical practitioners (except surgeons), dentists, and vets. The title is also used in Ireland for Catholic bishops, who are styled "The Most Reverend Dr X, Bishop of Y" on envelopes.

==== Italy ====
The first university of Western civilization, the University of Bologna, is located in Italy, where until modern times the only degree granted was that of the doctorate, and all other Italian universities followed that model. During the 20th century Italian universities introduced more advanced research degrees, such as the PhD.

Italian academia is part of the Bologna Process, and has standardised its degrees as part of the 3+2+3 formula. The undergraduate degree "laurea" was reduced to 3 years (making it equivalent to a bachelor's degree). This is followed by a 2-year "laurea magistrale" (literally "magistral degree", equivalent to a master's degree). The old-system "laurea", which lasted about 5–6 years and is now discontinued, were made equivalent to a "laurea magistrale". Few fields retain the 5-6 year system (such as law and medicine) but are called "laurea magistrale a ciclo unico" and are an integrated master's degree. Finally, the Italian system also introduced a doctorate ("dottorato di ricerca"), which lasts 3 years and is the terminal degree of the educational hierarchy, corresponding to a PhD.

For historical reasons, the title of doctor is awarded to all university degree holders. "Laurea" holders are awarded the title of doctor (dottore/dottoressa), "laurea magistrale" holders are awarded the title of magistral doctor (dottore magistrale/dottoressa magistrale), and doctorate holders are called research doctors (dottore di ricerca/dottoressa di ricerca).

==== Malta ====
In Malta, the title of Doctor is used by academic doctors (with PhDs), medical practitioners, dentists and lawyers. Its use by lawyers is due to the qualifying degree for practicing law having been the LLD until reforms in 2014, and has been described as "historical baggage" by the Dean of the University of Malta's law school. Lawyers do not generally use the title when practicing outside of Malta.

==== Netherlands ====
In the Dutch language doctor is used both for physicians and for the academic title, however the spelling differs with "dokter" referring to a physician, whereas "doctor" refers to the academic title. Both doctor titles are abbreviated as dr. placed before the holders name (note the lowercase).

To enter a Dutch doctoral defense, the candidate must hold a validated master's degree (a master's degree of an acknowledged university, or a master equivalent degree validated on a case-by-case basis by the Dutch government). In some cases the candidate can be granted special dispensation if no master's degree is held. There is no specific notation of the discipline in which the doctorate is obtained. Once the doctorate is obtained the preceding master's degree is generally no longer reported. Exceptions only exist for the disciplines with specific master titles of engineering "ir." ("ingenieur", i.e. Engineer) and law "mr." ("meester", i.e. Master of Law) where the title dr. is added to the original master title. For these disciplines, the original master's degree abbreviation is combined with the dr. abbreviation thus resulting in for example "dr. ir. Familyman". The dr. title is always placed in front of the ir. title. In the case of a PhD in law, the original mr. title is placed before the dr. title (mr. dr., see e.g. Jan Peter Balkenende). For a person having a law master's degree, but holding a PhD in another field than law the mr. title is placed after the dr. title (dr. mr.). No specific notation or title for the medical disciplines exists in the Netherlands. Although a physician is usually referred to as "dokter" (note the spelling difference) this does not necessarily imply the physician holds a doctoral degree; nor does it give the physician a title equivalent to that of PhD.

Confusion can be caused by the original Dutch Master level title "drs." (for all non-engineering and non-law master's degrees). This abbreviation stands for the Dutch title doctorandus Latin for "he who should become a doctor" (female form is "doctoranda"). Dutch drs. should not be confused with the plural 'doctorates': having multiple PhDs. Once a doctorate is achieved the doctorandus is promoted to doctor, and no longer uses the drs. abbreviation.
Stacking of multiples titles of the same level, as seen in countries like for example Germany (Dr. Dr. Dr. Musterfrau) is highly uncommon in the Netherlands (although stacking of titles with different levels is common: prof. dr. ir. Appelmans). Those who have multiple doctor titles may use dr.mult. before their name, although this is rarely used.

After obtaining a doctorate successfully, Dutch doctors may bear either the title dr. (lower case) before, or the letter D (rarely in practice) behind their name, but not both simultaneously. In the Netherlands, Academic titles are used exclusively within academia. Holding a doctorate has become a standard requirement for a university career. The doctor title has little to no meaning or implications for public life outside academia. It cannot be added to documentation (e.g. passport, drivers licence), and is used infrequently in daily practice.

Historically, the Netherlands used their own academic degree nomenclature, but for many years now have recognised and implemented the Bologna declaration. In everyday practice, the Anglo Saxon titles (e.g. PhD) are frequently used. Dutch academic titles and degrees are legally protected, and as of 2021 the traditional ’dr.’ and the PhD are legally equivalent and can be used interchangeably. Doctoral degrees (PhD degrees) can only be granted by recognised (research) universities. Illegal use of the title is considered a misdemeanour and subject to legal prosecution.

==== Portugal ====
In Portugal, up to recent times after the completion of an undergraduate degree – except in architecture and engineering – a person was referred to as doutor (Dr.) – male or doutora (Dra.) – female. The architects and engineers were referred by their professional titles: arquitecto (Arq.) and engenheiro (Eng.). Nurses are also referred to as "nurse", enfermeiro (male) or enfermeira (female), the title being Enf. for both.

Nowadays Portugal is a signatory to the Bologna process and according to the current legislation the title of Doctor (doutor, doutora) is reserved for graduate holders of an academic doctorate. Professions such as physicians, attorneys, pharmacists, veterinarians, and few others are usually referred to by the title Dr. (doutor) even if they have not been awarded a doctoral degree.

However, custom gives the legislation little strength and most graduates use the Dr. title in its abbreviated form, although use of the full Doutor is normally restricted to those with doctorates. Those who are both holders of an academic doctorate and Professors at a college level are generally referred to as Professor Doutor.

==== Spain ====
The social standing of Doctors in Spain is evidenced by the fact that only PhD holders, Grandees and Dukes can take seat and cover their heads in the presence of the King.

PhD Degrees are regulated by Royal Decree (RD 1393–2007), Real Decreto (in Spanish). They are granted by the university on behalf of the King, and its Diploma has the force of a public document. The Ministry of Science keeps a national database of doctoral theses called TESEO. Any person who uses the Spanish title of doctor/doctora (or Dr./Dra.) without being included in this Government database can be prosecuted for fraud. However, the Spanish Royal Academy recognises that it is used colloquially to describe physicians, even without doctoral degrees, as well as (in the feminine form, doctora, abbreviated Dra.) the wives of doctors (i.e. holders of doctoral degrees) and medics, as well as "women who shine with wisdom and understanding".

Unlike other countries, until recently Spain has registered a comparatively small number of Doctor degree holders, but the tendency is changing. According to the Spanish Statistical Office (INE), less than 5% of MSc degree holders are admitted to PhD programs. This reinforces the prestige that Doctors have historically enjoyed in Spain's society.

==== United Kingdom ====
Doctor is commonly used in the United Kingdom as the title for a person who has received a doctoral degree or, as courtesy title, for a qualified medical practitioner or dentist who does not have a doctorate. There are no restrictions on the use of the title "Doctor" in the United Kingdom, except where, in commercial advertising, it might imply that the user holds a general medical qualification. The UK government allows medical doctors and holders of doctorates to have the title recorded on the observations page of their UK passport. The lack of legal restrictions was confirmed in Parliament in 1996 by health minister Gerald Malone, who noted that the title doctor had never been restricted by law to either medical practitioners or those with doctoral degrees in the UK, although the titles "physician, doctor of medicine, licentiate in medicine and surgery, bachelor of medicine, surgeon, general practitioner and apothecary" were protected.

According to the etiquette guide, Debrett's, holders of doctoral degrees and medical doctors (but not surgeons) should be addressed as "Doctor". For medical doctors, "Doctor" is a professional title rather than an academic one: it is due to their being a medical practitioner rather than their having gained a doctoral degree. The Quality Assurance Agency states that "The use of the title 'Dr' by medical doctors is a historical abbreviation for the profession; it does not indicate a qualification at doctoral level". On guest lists and seating plans for formal events, holders of academic doctorates (but not medical doctors or other people using the title as a courtesy title) are listed either as "Dr John Smith" or "John Smith, Esq, PhD", while untitled men (other than those holding doctorates) are shown as either "Mr John Smith" or "John Smith, Esq" (as appropriate to ensure the styling remains consistent). (Note: No example is given for untitled women, either holding doctorates or otherwise) The title "Dr" is also used on visiting cards.

Medical students in the UK normally complete a course of study leading to the degree of Bachelor of Medicine and Bachelor of Surgery (MBBS, BMBS or MBChB). The MD degree is not a qualifying degree in the UK, but can be either a professional doctorate (at the same academic level as a PhD), a doctorate by thesis, or a higher doctorate, depending on the university. To be eligible for an MD degree in the UK one must already hold an entry-level medical degree (for example, MBBS, MBChB, BMed, or a North American MD degree) and usually must have had at least 5 years of postgraduate training and experience. Trainee doctors are permitted to use the title Doctor once they have started their post-graduation "Foundation Programme".

Debrett's states that medical doctors (except surgeons) should be addressed on envelopes as "Dr (full name), (medical qualifications)", e.g. "Dr John Smith, MD", "Dr Anne Jones, MB BS, FRCP", "Dr David Evans, MB ChB", contrary to the normal rule of not mixing titles and post-nominals. Surgeons (and dentists, if not holding a doctoral degree) should be "(full name), Esq, (medical/dental qualifications)", (Note: Debrett's gives no examples of the form for addressing a woman who is a surgeon or dentist; usual British practice is only to use "Esq" for men) e.g. "John Smith, Esq, MS, FRCS", "David Evans, Esq., BDS", but "Dr Anne Jones, DDS, FDS RCS",. By contrast, those holding (non medical or dental) doctoral degrees, if not surgeons, should be "Dr (full name)" without post-nominals on envelopes, e.g. "Dr John Smith".

A & C Black's Titles and Forms of Address diverges from Debrett's on how to address envelopes to medical doctors, omitting the pre-nominal title of Dr (e.g. John Smith, Esq, MD; John Smith, MD; John Smith, MB) except in Scotland and for general practitioners, where the post-nominals are instead usually omitted (e.g. Dr John Smith). Black's also state that it is down to individual choice whether non-medical doctors are addressed on envelopes as "Dr John Smith" or "John Smith, Esq, PhD" (or appropriate letters for the doctorate held), with the exception of doctors of divinity, who would be "The Rev. J. Smith, DD" on the envelope and "Reverend Sir" in a formal salutation (informally in the salutation "Dear Dr Smith", and "Dr Smith" in speech). (Note: Black's notes that non-clergy may be awarded DDs but gives no examples) (Note: Black's give no examples of addressing women with doctoral degrees or medical qualifications)

The custom of not referring to surgeons (members and fellows of the Royal College of Surgeons) as Dr has been commented on in the British Medical Journal and may stem from the historical origins of the profession such as that some barbers also used to function as surgeons. In 2005, the then-president of the Royal College of Surgeons called upon surgeons to use the title of Dr, saying that the use of Mr or Miss was confusing to patients. Black's note that gynaecologists are addressed as surgeons in England and Wales but as doctors elsewhere.

In a similar manner to the medical MBBS, dentists qualify with a Bachelor of Dental Surgery (BDS) and vets with a Bachelor of Veterinary Science (BVSc), Bachelor of Veterinary Medicine (BVetMed) or Bachelor of Veterinary Medicine and Surgery (BVMS). All of these are, like the MBBS, master's level qualifications that bear bachelor's designations for historical reasons.

Dentists have traditionally (as dental surgeons) been referred to in the same way as surgeons, but since 1995 the General Dental Council have permitted dentists to use the title "Doctor", though many do not choose to do this, thereby stressing their surgeon status. However, Debrett's continues to advises that dentists are normally addressed as surgeons and that the title "Doctor" is usually only used for dentists who have a doctoral degree.

On 5 March 2015 the council of the Royal College of Veterinary Surgeons (RCVS) voted to permit its members to use the courtesy title of "Doctor". Guidance from the RCVS says the title should be used either with the description "veterinary surgeon" or the postnominals "MRCVS" to ensure there is no confusion with doctors of human medicine or holders of doctoral degrees.

Optometrists are not permitted to use the title "Doctor" based on their initial qualification (BOptom or BSc (Optom)). Optometrists can earn PhDs or Doctor of Optometry degrees (in the UK a PhD-level qualification for qualified optometrists with experience in practice). Ophthalmologists are fully qualified medical doctors. However, ophthalmology is considered a branch of surgery, thus ophthalmologists, like other surgeons in the UK, do not use the title "Doctor".

The General Chiropractic Council permits registered chiropractors to use the title "Doctor", although it advises chiropractors to avoid using the title in advertising or, if they do, to spell out that they are "Doctors of Chiropractic". The Committee of Advertising Practice advises, however, that "references to 'DC' or 'doctor of chiropractic' are unlikely to dispel that misleading impression [of being a medical practitioner], when used in conjunction with unqualified references to the prefix 'Dr'", saying that the use of the title by chiropractors may be acceptable in advertising if "clearly and prominently qualified with additional text which makes clear it is a courtesy title and that the practitioner does not hold a general medical qualification".

The Advertising Standards Authority has ruled that practitioners of traditional Chinese medicine should not use the title doctor in adverts unless they hold a general medical qualification and are registered with the General Medical Council. It similarly advises that osteopaths should not use the title unless holding a general medical qualification. There have also been rulings that an advert for an osteomyologist which referred to him as a doctor was misleading, as was an advert which used the title "Dr" and the post-nominals "PhD" on the basis of a PhD from an unaccredited university.

Holders of honorary doctorates in the UK have the right, in most cases, to use the title of Doctor, although holders are encouraged to refrain from doing so. Black's says that "The same rules apply as to other holders", although notes that the post-nominals would not normally be used.

In some circumstances, "doctor" may be used on its own as a form of address rather than as a title before a name. This is limited to when the person is being addressed by their job title and so is only used for medical doctors.

===== Wales =====
Wales follows UK usage in English. In Welsh, the holder of a doctoral degree is doethur while a medical doctor is doctor or meddyg. The title "y Doethur" is used by those holding doctorates, e.g. "y Doethur Brinley Jones", "y Doethur John Elfed Jones", which can be abbreviated "Dr". Medical doctors use, as in English, the title "Doctor", also abbreviated "Dr".

==== Former Yugoslavia ====
In countries that were formerly Yugoslavian republics, such as Bosnia and Herzegovina, Croatia, North Macedonia, Montenegro, Serbia and Slovenia the title formally belongs to holders of academic doctoral degree such as doctor of science (dr. sc.) or doctor of arts (dr. art.) degree. There is no "Ph.D." in any of those countries, even though when holders are translating their dr. sc. degree to English, they nevertheless use "Ph.D.", even though it should be "D.Sc." or "Sc.D.".

Informally, the title, in both its full and abbreviated form (i.e. "dr.") is used honorifically to address medical doctors even in more formal environment like in lectored media texts, however officially it is reserved only for the holders of academic degrees. Formally the professional title for medical doctor is "lijekar" in Bosnian and Montenegrin, "liječnik" in Croatian, "lekar/лекар" in Macedonian and Serbian and "zdravnik" in Slovenian and they can hold different academic degrees, as well as additional honorific title of Primarius that is given to distinguished specialists with exemplary reputation and achievements.

=== Oceania ===
==== Australia ====
With the introduction of National Health Practitioner registration legislation on 1 July 2010, the title "doctor" is not restricted in any Australian state. The title "medical practitioner" is restricted for use by registered medical practitioners, while the title "doctor" is not restricted by law. Despite this, the Medical Board of Australia advises that practitioners who are not medical practitioners who choose to use the title 'Doctor' (or 'Dr') should clearly state their profession in advertisements, even if they hold a PhD or another doctoral degree, e.g. 'Dr Smith (Dentist)' or 'Dr Jones (Chiropodist)'. The Psychology Board of Australia prohibits psychologists from using the title, to avoid confusion with psychiatrists, unless they hold a doctoral degree, in which case they must make it clear that they are not a medical practitioner or psychiatrist, e.g. by putting '(Psychologist)' after their name. The Australian Qualifications Framework (AQF) defines doctoral degrees as being at Level 10 of the framework; it specifies that: "Individuals who have been awarded a Doctoral Degree at Level 10 on the AQF are entitled to use the title 'Doctor'. The title 'Doctor' will not be used by those who hold an honorary award." The name 'Doctor' is also used in the name of some extended master's degrees at Level 9 (e.g. Juris Doctor and Doctor of Medicine); these are not considered doctoral degrees.

== Abbreviation ==
Doctor is abbreviated "Dr" in British English and "Dr." in North American English. The plural abbreviation is "Drs".

=== British usage ===
In British English it is not necessary to indicate an abbreviation with a full stop after the abbreviation, when the first and last letters of the abbreviation are the same as for the unabbreviated word, i.e. the abbreviation is a contraction, as in the case for "Doctor".

In the United Kingdom, it is normal also to omit stops from postnominal letters, thus the usual abbreviation for "Doctor of Philosophy" is "PhD" (or "DPhil", where this is used). The fully punctuated "Ph.D." or "D.Phil." is anachronistic and, where the abbreviated form of the degree is defined by regulation rather than custom (e.g. Oxford), may be technically incorrect.

=== American usage ===
American English makes no distinction between abbreviations that are contractions and abbreviations that are not. A period is used: the abbreviation of Doctor is usually written as "Dr." in North America. However, the US Postal Service prefers punctuation to be omitted from addresses.

== Honorary doctorates ==
An honorary doctorate is a doctoral degree awarded for service to the institution or the wider community. It may also be awarded for outstanding achievement in a particular field. This service or achievement does not need to be academic in nature. Often, the same set of degrees is used for higher doctorates, but they are distinguished as being honoris causa: in comprehensive lists, the lettering used to indicate the possession of a higher doctorate is often adjusted to indicate this, for example, "Hon ScD", as opposed to the earned research doctorate "ScD". The degrees of Doctor of the University (DUniv) and Doctor of Humane Letters (DHL), however, are only awarded as honorary degrees.

By convention, recipients of honorary doctorates do not use the title "Dr" in general correspondence, although in formal correspondence from the university issuing the honorary degree it is normal to address the recipient by the title. However, this social convention is not always scrupulously observed; notable people who defied social convention and used the honorary prefix include:

- Benjamin Franklin, who received honorary master's degrees from Harvard and Yale in 1753, and from the College of William & Mary in 1756, and doctorates from the University of St Andrews in 1759 and the University of Oxford in 1762 for his scientific accomplishments. He thereafter referred to himself as "Doctor Franklin".
- Maya Angelou, who held many honorary doctorates, called herself and was referred to by many as "Dr. Angelou" despite holding no undergraduate or advanced (non-honorary) degree.
- Booker T. Washington was often referred to as "Dr. Washington" after receiving an honorary doctorate from Dartmouth College.
- Sukarno, President of Indonesia, was awarded twenty-six honorary doctorates from various international universities including Columbia University, the University of Michigan, the University of Berlin, the Al-Azhar University, the University of Belgrade, the Lomonosov University and many more. And also from domestic universities including the Universitas Gadjah Mada, the Universitas Indonesia, the Bandung Institute of Technology, and the Universitas Padjadjaran. He had often been referred to by Indonesian Government at the time as 'Dr. Ir. Sukarno', combined with his degree in architecture (Ir.) from Bandung Institute of Technology. Sukarno is the president with the highest number of honorary doctorates in the world.
- Author and lexicographer Samuel Johnson, who had some years earlier been unable (due to financial considerations) to complete his undergraduate studies at Pembroke College, Oxford, was awarded the degree of Master of Arts by diploma in 1755, in recognition of his scholarly achievements. In 1765, Trinity College Dublin awarded him the degree of Doctor of Laws and in 1775 Oxford bestowed upon him the degree of Doctor of Civil Law by diploma. He never referred to himself as "Dr. Johnson", even though a degree by diploma is distinct from an honorary degree, but it was used by his contemporaries and in his biography by James Boswell.

== Other uses ==
- In some regions, such as the Southern United States, "Doctor" is traditionally added to the first name of people holding doctorates, where it is used in either direct or indirect familiar address.
- "Doc" is a common nickname for someone with a doctoral degree, in real life and in fiction — for example, the gunfighter Doc Holliday, the Australian politician H.V. "Doc" Evatt, the character "Doc" in Gunsmoke, and pulp hero Doc Savage.
- In Roman Catholicism and several other Christian denominations, a Doctor of the Church is an eminent theologian (for example, Saint Thomas Aquinas, also known as the Angelic Doctor) from whose teachings the whole Church is held to have derived great advantage.
- African leaders often refer to themselves as "Doctor" as part of their title upon assuming office.

== See also ==
- Ijazah
- Postdoc
