= Docker =

Docker most often refers to:

- A dockworker, a manual laborer who is involved in loading and unloading ships, also called a longshoreman or stevedore
- Docker (software), an open-source software project automating the deployment of applications inside software containers
  - Docker, Inc., the company promoting Docker software

Docker(s) may also refer to:

== Places ==
- Docker, Cumbria, a civil parish in England
- Docker, Lancashire, a hamlet in England
- Docker, Victoria, Australia
- Docker River or Kaltukatjara, a place in Northern Territory, Australia

== Brands and enterprises ==
- Dockers (brand), a brand of men's clothing originally by Levi Strauss & Co.

== Sports teams ==
- Cincinnati Dockers, an American-based Australian rules football team
- Drogheda Dockers, a football team in the Australian Rules Football League of Ireland
- Duisburg Dockers, baseball and American football teams in Duisburg, Germany
- Fremantle Football Club, nicknamed the Dockers, an Australian Football League team
- Hamburg Dockers, a football team in the Australian Football League of Germany
- Millwall F.C., formerly nicknamed the Dockers

== Other uses ==
- Docker (surname), a surname (including a list of people with the name)
- Dockers (film), a British television drama film
- Roller docker, a baking tool used to perforate dough

== See also ==
- Dock (disambiguation)
- Docking (disambiguation)
