= Dockx =

Dockx is a surname. Notable people with the surname include:

- Bart Dockx (born 1981), Belgian professional road bicycle racer
- Daniel Martin Dockx (born 1974), Spanish Olympic dressage rider
- Félix Dockx, Belgian cyclist
- Gert Dockx (born 1988), Belgian professional road bicycle racer
- Jean Dockx (1941–2002), Belgian international footballer

== See also ==
- Dock
