= Johnny Unitas Stadium =

Sports stadium in Towson, Maryland

Coordinates: 39.388462°N 76.615936°W

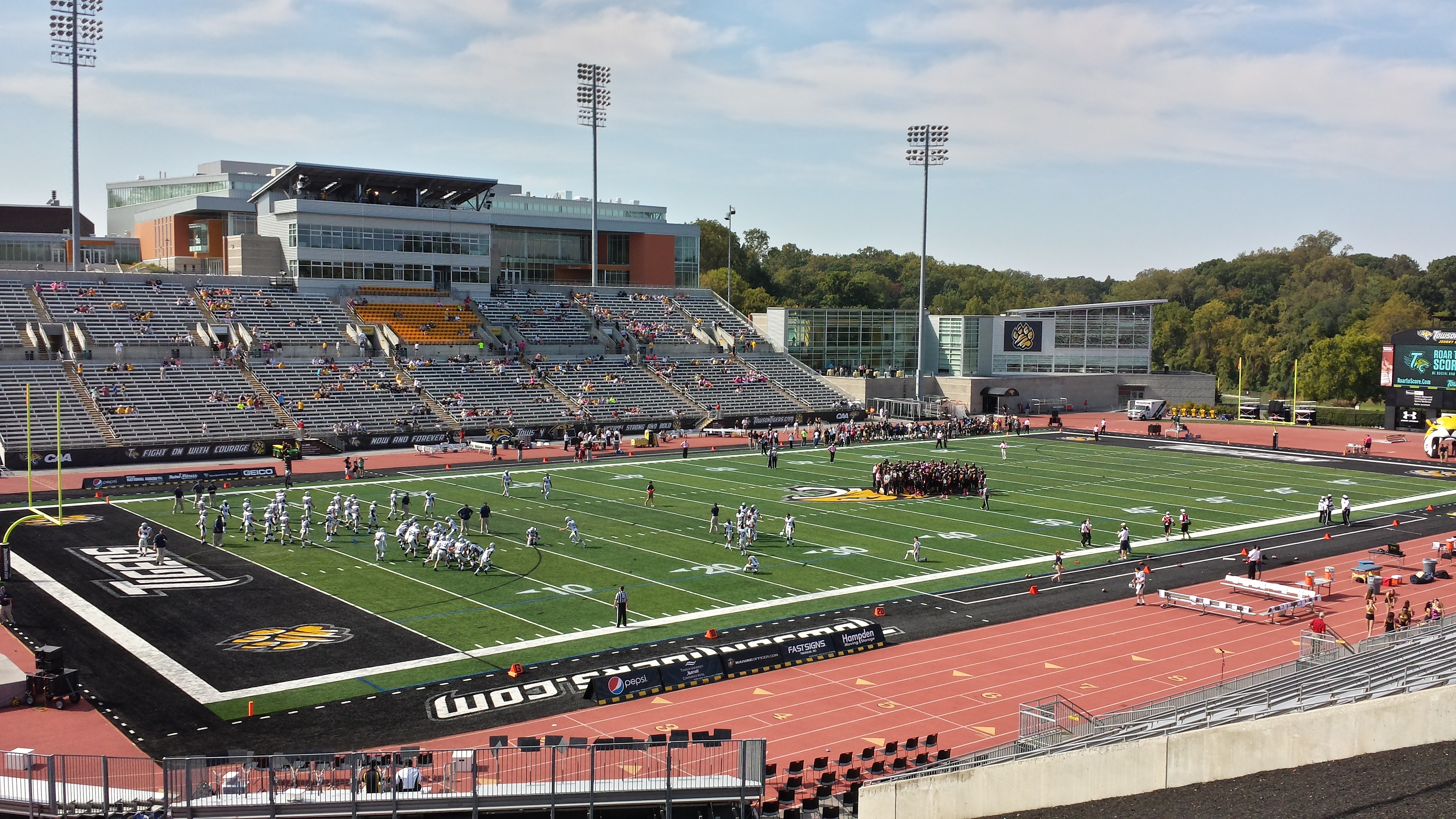
- Interactive map of Johnny Unitas Stadium
- Former names: Towson Stadium (1978–1982); Minnegan Stadium (1983–2001); Towson University Stadium (2002–2003)
- Location: 7500 Osler Drive; Towson, Maryland 21252
- Owner: Towson University
- Operator: Towson University
- Capacity: 11,198
- Surface: FieldTurf

Construction
- Groundbreaking: 1976
- Opened: September 9, 1978
- Renovated: 2002
- Cost: $32 million
- Architect: Ellerbe Becket (renovation)

Tenants
- Towson Tigers (NCAA) (1978–present) football, men's and women's lacrosse, track and field, cross country Baltimore Bayhawks (MLL) (2004–2006)

Johnny Unitas Stadium is a multi-purpose sports stadium in Towson, Maryland, United States. The home of several Towson University athletics teams, it is also known as Minnegan Field at Johnny Unitas Stadium or Unitas Stadium.

== History ==
The stadium opened in 1978 as Towson Stadium when the Towson Tigers were in their ninth year of collegiate play and their final year of Division III. The new, lighted facility had 5,000 seats. The name of the stadium was changed to Minnegan Stadium in 1983 to honor former Towson coach and athletic director Donald "Doc" Minnegan.

The sports complex began a $32 million renovation beginning in 1999. The renovations, which were completed in 2002, added 6,000 seats, artificial turf, an entry-level plaza, concession stands, new restrooms, ticket booths, a four-tier press box, a field house, and a promenade that connects the northside and southside seating areas.

The stadium is named for the Baltimore Colts' Hall of Fame quarterback Johnny Unitas, the father of three Towson students, who had taken a job trying to find a corporate sponsor for the stadium with Towson University weeks before his death in 2002. In fact, Unitas threw his last public pass at the re-opening of the facility (as Towson University Stadium) just a few days before his death. His widow, Sandy, felt it appropriate to honor him by having the stadium named for him instead, with fund-raising in his name taking the place of the money that a corporate naming would have supplied. The stadium was rededicated a year after it opened, October 11, 2003.

In 2008, the Unitas Stadium scoreboard was replaced with a 16:9 full video scoreboard. The new scoreboard stands where the previous scoreboard was placed. The old incandescent light scoreboard was recycled and a new smaller LED scoreboard was installed in the opposite endzone.

In May 2012, new "Fieldturf Revolution" was installed in the stadium.

== Tenants ==
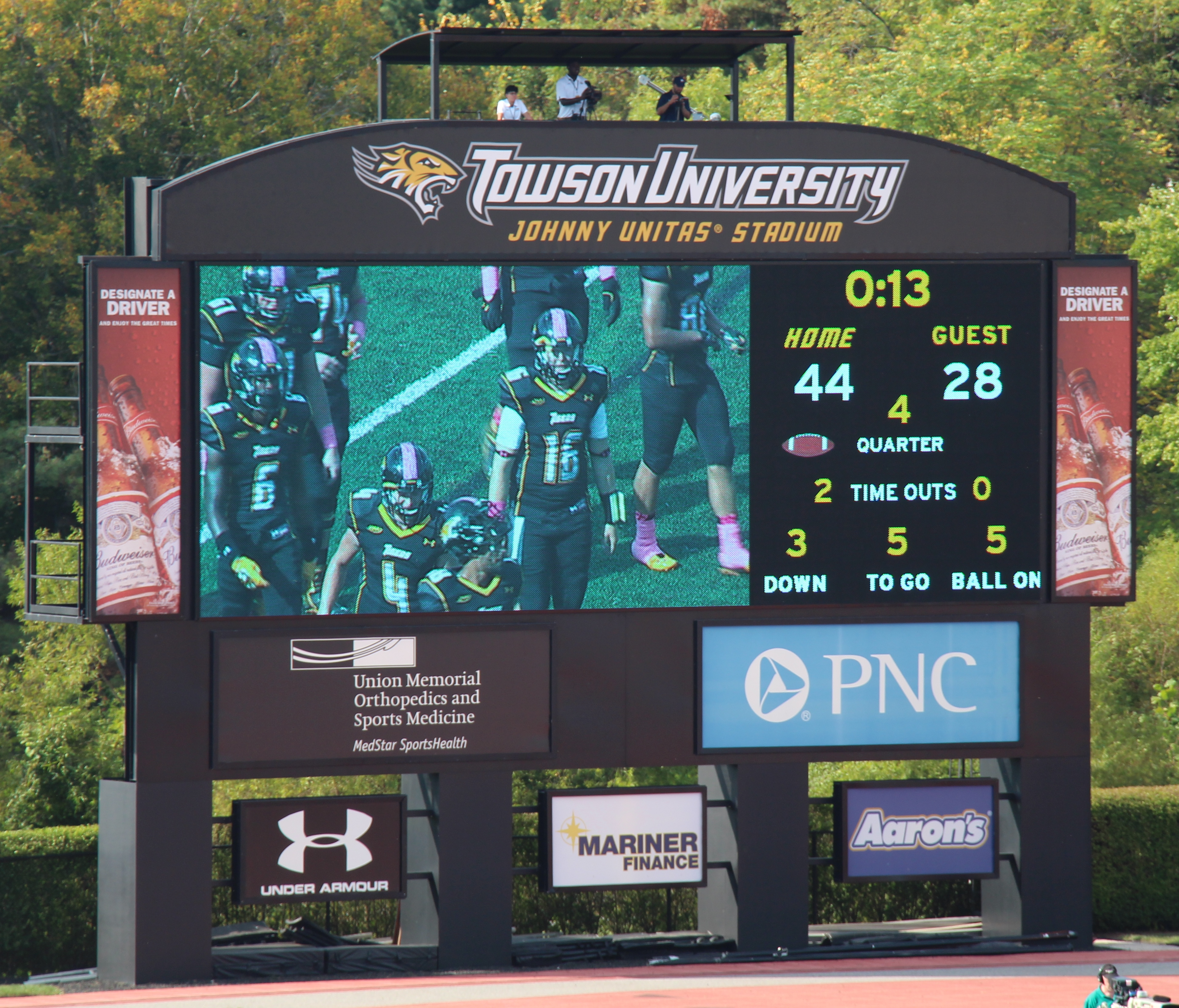
The new Unitas Stadium scoreboard in 2013 after a 44-28 victory over New Hampshire

It is the home field for the Towson football, men's and women's lacrosse, and the women's track and field team. The university's annual fall pep rally is held at the stadium.

In addition to Towson events, the stadium has also been used for high school football and lacrosse events, the Under 19 World Lacrosse Championship, Maryland Interscholastic Athletic Association lacrosse championships, several NCAA Division I women's lacrosse championships as well as competition in the NCAA Division I men's lacrosse championships.

The Baltimore Bayhawks of Major League Lacrosse used Johnny Unitas Stadium as their home stadium from 2004 to 2006.

From 2008 to 2010, the NCAA women's lacrosse Final Four and championship were held in Johnny Unitas Stadium. In 2008, Northwestern University defeated the University of Pennsylvania 10-6, giving the Wildcats their fourth consecutive NCAA title in women's lacrosse. In 2009, Northwestern defeated the University of North Carolina 21-7, for their fifth title in a row. The 2010 final saw the University of Maryland defeat Northwestern 13-11. This was the Terps' 10th NCAA title in women's lacrosse.

The Under Armour All-American Lacrosse Game for high school athletes has been played at Unitas since 2006, its inaugural year.

== Field house ==
On April 26, 2003, the final renovations to the stadium were completed with the construction of the four-story, 48,000-square-foot (4,500 m^{2}) field house near the stadium's west end zone. The field house features offices, meeting rooms, locker rooms, class rooms, a film editing room, an athlete learning center, an athletic training room and an equipment room. It also has a rooftop patio from which guests can view athletic contests in the adjoining stadium.

=== The Minnegan Room ===
The Minnegan Room on the third floor of the field house is named after longtime faculty member, athletic director and coach "Doc" Minnegan. It is a multipurpose room that has a top view of the action on the field as well as the stadium. The Minnegan Room can accommodate up to 200 guests.

=== Towson Athletics Sports Medicine Facility ===
The field house's Sports Medicine Facility is a 3,000-square-foot (280 m^{2}) suite with separate taping, treatment, rehabilitation, and hydrotherapy areas. The state-of-the-art hydrotherapy and rehabilitation areas include the Swimex system and Biodex training equipment. The facility also includes a physician exam room, conference room, and staff offices.

== See also ==
- List of NCAA Division I FCS football stadiums
