= Jonathan Abramowitz =

American clinical psychologist (born 1969)

- Abramowitz in 2026
- Born: Jonathan Stuart Abramowitz; June 11, 1969 (age 57); Baltimore, Maryland, U.S.
- Education: Muhlenberg College (BA); Bucknell University (MA); University of Memphis (PhD); University of Pennsylvania
- Occupations: Clinical psychologist, professor, researcher, author
- Organization: University of North Carolina at Chapel Hill
- Known for: Research on OCD; exposure and response prevention; OCD assessment
- Website: www.jonabram.web.unc.edu

Jonathan Stuart Abramowitz (born June 11, 1969) is an American clinical psychologist, researcher, and professor of psychology at the University of North Carolina at Chapel Hill (UNC-CH). His research focuses on obsessive–compulsive disorder (OCD) and anxiety disorders.

Abramowitz served as president of the Association for Behavioral and Cognitive Therapies (ABCT) in 2015 and was the founding editor-in-chief of the Journal of Obsessive-Compulsive and Related Disorders. He directs the Clinical Psychology PhD Training Program at the University of North Carolina at Chapel Hill.

== Academic career ==
Abramowitz earned a B.A. in Psychology from Muhlenberg College in 1991, an M.A. in psychology from Bucknell University in 1993, and a Ph.D. in clinical psychology from the University of Memphis in 1998. He completed his predoctoral internship and postdoctoral fellowship at the Center for Treatment and Study of Anxiety at the University of Pennsylvania.

From 2000-2006 he held clinical and academic appointments at the Mayo Clinic (Rochester, Minnesota). In 2006 he joined the faculty of the University of North Carolina at Chapel Hill, where he is a professor in the Department of Psychology and Neuroscience.

Abramowitz has published books, book chapters, and peer reviewed journal articles on OCD and anxiety disorders. He has served on editorial boards of several scientific journals and is a member of the International OCD Foundation's Scientific and Clinical Advisory Board.

== Research areas and contributions ==
=== Treatment of OCD and anxiety disorders ===
Abramowitz studies psychological treatments for OCD, particularly exposure and response prevention (ERP). His work includes treatment studies, reviews, and meta-analyses, and investigations of factors associated with treatment response. He and his colleagues have also examined the integration of cognitive and acceptance-based strategies, including acceptance and commitment therapy (ACT) into OCD treatment.

Abramowitz has also written about the application of extinction and inhibitory learning to exposure-based treatment of OCD.

=== OCD Symptom dimensions and assessment ===
Abramowitz has studied the classification of OCD symptoms into dimensions, including contamination, responsibility for harm, unwelcome thoughts, and symmetry or incompleteness concerns.

In 2010, Abramowitz and colleagues developed the Dimensional Obsessive-Compulsive Scale (DOCS), a 20-item self-report instrument designed to assess the severity of four major OCD symptom dimensions. He has also collaborated on the development and evaluation of brief OCD screening instruments, including the four-item Obsessive-Compulsive Inventory (OCI-4).

=== Cognitive-behavioral and motivational models of OCD ===
Abramowitz has investigated cognitive and behavioral processes associated with OCD, including factors involved in the development and maintenance of symptoms. More recently, he and his colleagues have proposed a framework for understanding OCD symptoms in terms of underlying affective and motivational processes, including avoidance of perceived threat, guilt, disgust, and feelings of incompleteness, rather than primarily by symptom content.

=== Scrupulosity ===
Abramowitz has studied scrupulosity, form of OCD involving religious or moral obsessions and compulsions. He co-developed the Penn Inventory of Scrupulosity (PIOS), a self-report measure of religious obsessions and compulsions. He has also published a cognitive-behavioral analysis of scrupulosity examining its relationship to religious practices and implications for exposure and response prevention.

=== Perinatal and postpartum OCD ===
Abramowitz has studied obsessive-compulsive symptoms during pregnancy and the postpartum period, including the intrusive thoughts, cognitive risk factors, and predictors of postpartum OCD symptoms. He also collaborated on the development and evaluation of Baby PREP, a prevention program to reduce postpartum OCD symptoms. More recent studies have examined relationships among perinatal OCD symptoms, depression, partner relationship quality, and maternal-infant bonding.

=== Cultural and contextual factors ===
Abramowitz has also worked on research examining cultural and religious influences on OCD symptoms and their assessment.

== Awards, recognition, and leadership ==
Abramowitz served as president of the Association for Behavioral and Cognitive Therapies (ABCT) from 2014 to 2015 and is a Fellow of the association. He has also served on the Board of Directors of the Anxiety and Depression Association of America and is a member of the Scientific and Clinical Advisory Board of the International OCD Foundation.

Abramowitz was the founding editor-in-chief of the Journal of Obsessive-Compulsive and Related Disorders.

Abramowitz received Muhlenberg College's Alumni Achievement Award (2011) and the UNC-Chapel Hill Faculty Award for Excellence in Doctoral Mentoring (2020).

== Selected works ==
=== Books ===
- Abramowitz, J. S. (2006). Understanding and treating obsessive-compulsive disorder: A cognitive-behavioral approach. Mahwah, NJ: Lawrence Erlbaum Associates, Inc. ISBN 9780805851847
- Abramowitz, J. S. (2018). Getting over OCD: A 10-step workbook for taking back your life (2nd edition). New York: Guilford Press. ISBN 9781593859992
- Abramowitz, J. S., Deacon, B. J., & Whiteside, S. P. (2019). Exposure therapy for anxiety: Principles and practice (2nd ed). New York: Guilford Press. ISBN 9781462539529
- Abramowitz, J. S., & Blakey, S. M. (2020). Clinical handbook of fear and anxiety: Maintenance processes and treatment mechanisms. Washington DC: American Psychological Association. ISBN 978-1-4338-3065-5
- Abramowitz, J. S. (2021). The family guide to getting over OCD: Reclaim your life and help your loved one. Guilford Publications. ISBN 978-1462541362
- Abramowitz, J. S. (2024). Living well with OCD: Practical strategies for improving your daily life. New York: Guilford press. ISBN 9781462556540
- Abramowitz, J. S., & Jacoby, R. J. (2025). Obsessive-compulsive disorder in adults. Hogrefe Publishing. ISBN 978-0889376076

=== Journal articles ===
- Abramowitz, Jonathan S. (1997). "Effectiveness of psychological and pharmacological treatments for obsessive-compulsive disorder: A quantitative review". Journal of Consulting and Clinical Psychology. 65 (1): 44–52. doi:10.1037/0022-006X.65.1.44.
- McKay, Dean; Abramowitz, Jonathan S.; Calamari, John E.; Kyrios, Michael (2004). "A critical evaluation of obsessive-compulsive disorder subtypes: Symptoms versus mechanisms". Clinical Psychology Review. 24 (3): 283–313. doi:10.1016/j.cpr.2004.04.003.
- Taylor, Steven; Zvolensky, Michael J.; Cox, Brian J.; Deacon, Brett J.; Heimberg, Richard G.; Ledley, Deborah Roth; Abramowitz, Jonathan S. (2007). "Robust dimensions of anxiety sensitivity: Development and initial validation of the Anxiety Sensitivity Index-3". Psychological Assessment. 19 (2): 176–188. doi:10.1037/1040-3590.19.2.176.
- Abramowitz, Jonathan S.; Taylor, Steven; McKay, Dean (2009). "Obsessive-compulsive disorder". The Lancet. 374 (9688): 491–499. doi:10.1016/S0140-6736(09)60240-3.
- Abramowitz, Jonathan S.; Deacon, Brett J.; Olatunji, Bunmi O.; Wheaton, Michael G.; Berman, Noah C. (2010). "Assessment of obsessive-compulsive symptom dimensions: Development and evaluation of the Dimensional Obsessive-Compulsive Scale". Psychological Assessment. 22 (1): 180–198. doi:10.1037/a0018260.
- Abramowitz, Jonathan S. (2013). "The practice of exposure therapy: Relevance of cognitive-behavioral theory and extinction theory". Behavior Therapy. 44 (4): 548–558. doi:10.1016/j.beth.2013.03.003.
- Abramowitz, Jonathan S.; Fabricant, Laura E.; Taylor, Steven; Deacon, Brett J.; McKay, Dean; Storch, Eric A. (2014). "The relevance of analogue studies for understanding obsessions and compulsions". Clinical Psychology Review. 34 (3): 206–217. doi:10.1016/j.cpr.2014.01.004.
- Abramowitz, Jonathan S.; Blakey, Shannon M.; Reuman, Lillian; Buchholz, Jennifer L. (2018). "New directions in the cognitive-behavioral treatment of OCD: Theory, research, and practice". Behavior Therapy. 49 (3): 311–322. doi:10.1016/j.beth.2017.09.002.
- Abramowitz, Jonathan S.; Hellberg, Samantha N.; Krasnow, Janice; et al. (2025). "Prenatal obsessive beliefs predict postpartum obsessive-compulsive symptoms: A prospective study". Psychiatry Research. 351: 116620. doi:10.1016/j.psychres.2025.116620.
- Abramowitz, Jonathan S.; Abramovitch, Amitai; McKay, Dean; Draffin, Alyssa (2026). "Management of obsessive-compulsive disorder in adults". BMJ. 392: e083443. doi:10.1136/bmj-2024-083443.
- Abramowitz, Jonathan S.; Melli, Gabriele (2026). "From topography to function: Rethinking the conceptualization of obsessive-compulsive disorder". Behavior Therapy. doi:10.1016/j.beth.2026.10.001.
