= Alfred Docking =

English missionary (1860–1938)

Alfred E. Docking (born April 9, 1860 – 1938) was a Presbyterian missionary in Alaska in the 1890s. He was born in Sawston, Cambridgeshire, England. Docking emigrated to America and settled in Kansas with his parents, Robert Docking and Martha Mynott, in 1876. Docking chose to direct his missionary efforts towards Native American populations, first in Oklahoma (then called Indian Territory), where he worked as a superintendent of Spencer Academy in the town of Nelson. During the years 1891–1893 Docking and his wife, Anna Allen Marshall, taught at the Sitka Training School, a Presbyterian missionary school for Indian boys and girls at Sitka, Alaska. Docking and his family went to California in 1894, where he was ordained after completing his education at the San Francisco Theological Seminary in 1895. Docking gave many speeches in Alaska and California and recruited teachers for the Presbyterian missions there. He died in 1938 in Pueblo, Colorado.
