= Doc (mascot) =

Official mascot of Towson University

Coordinates: 39°23′37.37″N 76°36′26.92″W

Doc the Tiger
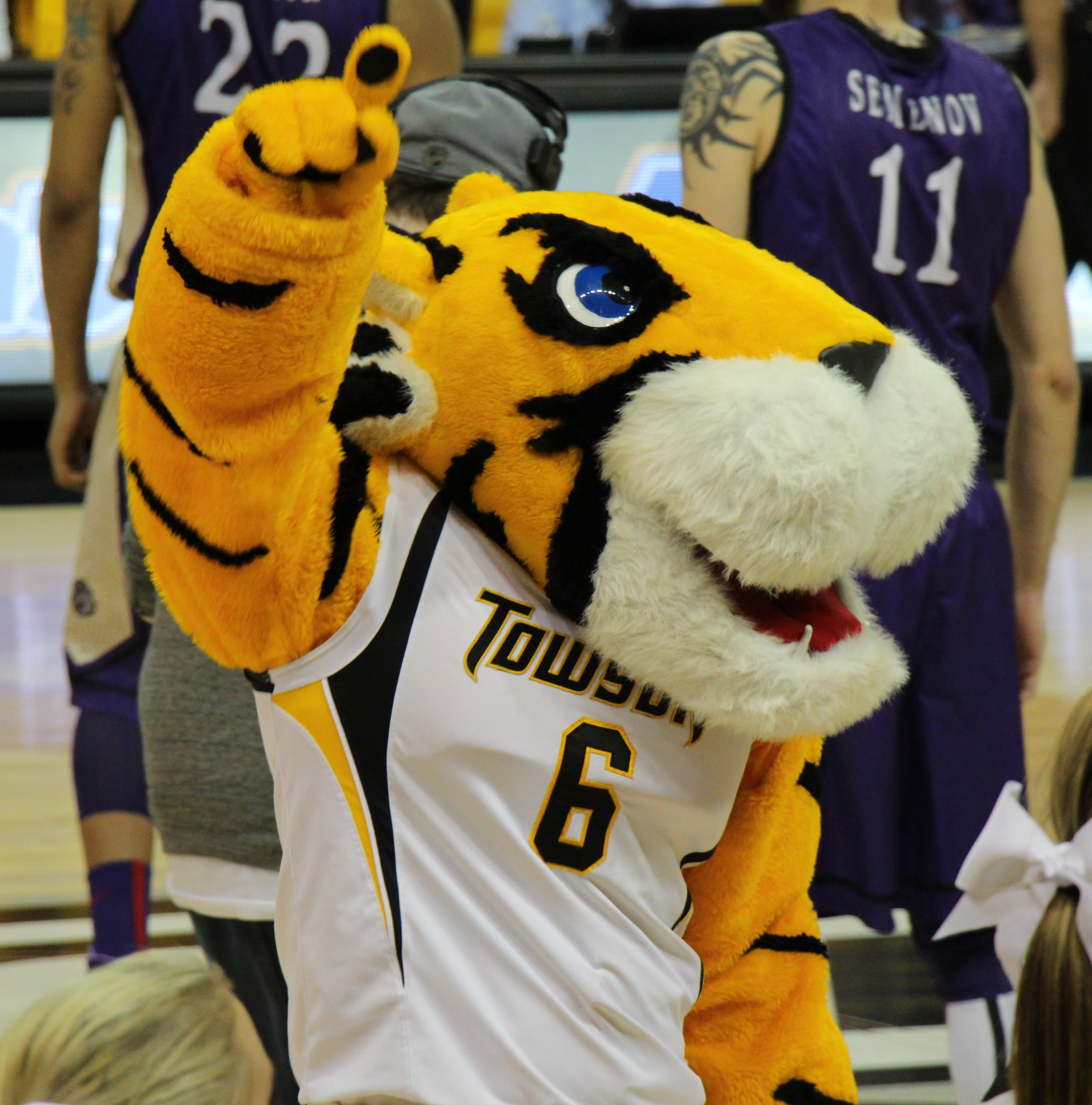
- Doc at a Towson Tigers men's basketball game
- University: Towson University
- Conference: CAA
- Description: Anthropomorphic Tiger
- Origin of name: Named after former athletic director Donald "Doc" Minnegan
- First seen: 1963

Doc is the official mascot of Towson University. He is named after former sports department head Donald "Doc" Minnegan.

== History ==
=== The Golden Knights ===
The Knights mascot may have come from the 1920s and 1930s, when an elaborate Olde English Christmas dinner was held with knights and ladies costumes, music and a pageant. The 1930 Tower Echoes used Renaissance style pictures of archers to depict athletes and campus life. In 1951, the Knight was used all over Towson with references to the campus being a Camelot with "merry court life" (student activities) and "many tournaments" (sports). The late 1950s, however, brought other mascots—the lacrosse team was the "Indians" and the wrestling team, the "Teachers".

=== The Tiger ===
Lou Winkelman as "Mr. Tiger"

Lou Winkelman with the tiger

The first appearance of the tiger on campus was with the help of Towson alumnus Lou Winkelman. He was the very first tiger mascot, in the 1963 homecoming parade. According to Winkelman, they just went to a costume shop and rented the tiger suit.

Winkelman actually introduced the tiger as the official Towson mascot winning Student Government Association's approval a year before the parade. It took about a year, but by 1963, along with the help of John Schuerholz students accepted it and Towson made the tiger its official mascot.

The tiger coming to Towson began in the early 1960s when Winkelman was a member of the men's soccer team. He says no one on the team wanted to be called the Golden Knights, the most popular name for sports teams prior to 1961.

Winkelman and his teammates had their own idea and simply adopted the tiger as their mascot. Although they wore jerseys with a knight and horse logo, they were adamant that they would be called tigers in their yearbook photo.

Student interest in the tiger remained high through the 1960s encouraged by Winkleman's weekly sports column Tiger Tales in The Towerlight, the school newspaper. The Towerlight masthead's use of the tiger image from 1966–1969 and a gift of a stone tiger statue by the Class of '67, stolen from campus a few years later.

In the 1970s, however, the Towson Tiger was rarely referenced or talked about. Other than brief sports stories, there is only one reference in a 1970s yearbook. The tiger resurfaced in the 1980s with the purchase of the first official costume by the sports program and with a major presence in almost every issue of Tower Echoes and around the campus.

In 2003 the tiger was renamed "Doc" in honor of longtime faculty member Donald Minnegan.

Doc also makes appearances at almost all of the football games and several sporting events around campus and several community events around Towson. Former Towson Tiger football player Big Dan McPartland becomes incensed each and every time he sees Doc prowling the sidelines of Unitas Stadium wearing the #75 jersey, the very jersey number he once wore.

== Tiger statue ==
TU's tiger statue is a bronze tiger that sits in front of Stephens Hall, the oldest academic building on campus. There has been another fiberglass tiger that was created in 1996, but was taken down in 2006 due to vandalism. There was also a gift of a stone tiger statue by the class of 1967, but was stolen from the campus a few years later.

=== The first statue ===
The idea of bringing the tiger to Towson started with the introduction of a bill on February 28, 1995. The SGA allocated $3,000 though it was purchased for $2,500 for a fiberglass tiger to create a more positive campus atmosphere. Donna Garrison, an SGA senator at the time, had heard student complaints of Towson lacking school spirit.

The tiger was erected and placed on the campus at the end of the Spring 1996 semester.

The following September it lost its tail to vandals. The damage totaled $500. The tiger was repaired and was fine for six months until March 17, 1997. On that evening, police aide Ron Bond saw seven males pushing the tiger off its platform, but upon police arrival, the seven fled the scene. Three were apprehended, one of whom was not a TU student. The statue had been bolted to the platform by its three paws, and the paws were damaged in the attempt to move the tiger. One of the tiger's canine teeth was also broken off in the act.

The last incident occurred over spring break in 2006. On Sunday, March 19, 2006, the Towson University Police Department received the first of two reports of destruction of the tiger statue. They had spray-painted profanities on the tiger between Saturday afternoon and Sunday evening. A few days later, the tiger's paw and teeth were removed.

The police reports said Aramark estimated the cost of repair at $1,500. Since then the statue has been removed. These incidents were not the only acts of vandalism on the tiger statue. Since it had found its home on "The Beach", the tiger has lost part of its tail, and a few teeth. There was even an attempted robbery.

In February, the university looked into repairing or replacing what the students called an eyesore. She asked Jeff Ellis of Scenic Artistry & Custom Finishes and Joseph Clarkson of Fiberglass Specialties to appraise the statue. "It looked pretty much beyond repair," Ellis said in an interview. "It's one of those things where you don't know where to start and where to finish."

=== Bronze statue ===
In September 2006, The Towerlight reported that a new bronze tiger statue had been unveiled as the centerpiece of the university's "Capital Campaign" to raise $50 million. The primary difference between the new statue and previous one is that the new one is made of bronze and all of the legs are on the ground and the tail is wrapped around its legs rather than raised, so it won't get damaged by vandals.

The new statue is outside Stephens Hall and was unveiled on February 8, 2007 where Caret said it would be "visible to passersby on York Road as well as students".

A lot of students, however, have expressed disapproval of putting the new statue outside of Stephens Hall. They say since most students don't have class in the building, most Towson students probably wouldn't see the new statue. In 2009, a duplicate was placed in front of the library, near the old statue's location.

In 2012 a statue, in a different position, was placed at the new entrance of the university.

In 2013, a fourth statue was placed near the entrance to the recently completed SECU Arena.

== Previous mascots ==
- Knights (pre-1961)
- Teachers (Wrestling - 1961)
- Indians (lacrosse 1960)
