= Behnaz Babazadeh =

Afghan-American photographer

Behnaz Babazadeh is an Afghan-American photographer. Babazadeh immigrated to the United States from Afghanistan as a child. Her photographs of burqas made out of colorful American candies challenge the western notion that burqas are an oppressive garment.

== Biography ==
Babazadeh moved with her family to the United States in the mid-1990s when she was seven years old. She attended Towson University, studying digital art and design. She received her MFA in design and technology in 2012 jointly from Parsons School of Design and The New School.

Beginning in 2017 she has hosted hackathons in Kabul, Afghanistan under the organization she founded called Code93.

== Art ==
In 2012, Babazadeh created the multimedia series, Burqaphilia, of self portraits, videos, and installations featuring burqas made of candy.

In 2020, Babazedah created another series entitled Burqa Diaries, featuring photos of a woman wearing a traditional blue burqa doing typically American activities (filling a car with gas, getting a manicure, and visiting an art museum).
