= William Glauber =

American reporter

William Glauber is an American reporter who currently works at the Milwaukee Journal Sentinel (and has since 2006).

Glauber graduated from Towson University in 1979 with a BS in History. He began at the Baltimore Sun where he was a sports reporter before shifting his focus to politics. While at the Sun, he served as the London Correspondent and covered the first U.S. air strikes against Afghanistan. Between 2001 and 2002, he was an embedded reporter with the U.S military, writing on issues during the rule of Saddam Hussein and under U.S.-led occupation. Shortly thereafter, he worked as a Metro Reporter at the Chicago Tribune(from 2002 to 2005) where he also covered national and international stories and wrote editorials.
