= Stanley Docking =

English footballer

Personal information
- Full name: Stanley Holbrook Docking
- Date of birth: 13 December 1914
- Place of birth: Chopwell, England
- Date of death: 27 May 1940 (aged 25)
- Place of death: Newcastle-upon-Tyne, England
- Height: 5 ft 10 in (1.78 m)
- Position: Inside left

Senior career*
Years	Team	Apps	(Gls)
1933	Birtley		
1934–1938	Newcastle United	21	(3)
1938–1939	Tranmere Rovers	31	(7)
- Hartlepool United
Total		52	(10)
- * Club domestic league appearances and goals

Stanley Holbrook Docking (13 December 1914 – 27 May 1940) was an English professional footballer who played as an inside-left in the Football League for Newcastle United and Tranmere Rovers.

== Personal life ==
Docking served as an Aircraftman 2nd Class in the Royal Air Force Volunteer Reserve during the Second World War. He died of apparent disinfectant poisoning at Royal Victoria Infirmary, Newcastle-upon-Tyne on 27 May 1940. Docking was buried at Whitley Bay (Hartley South) Cemetery.

== Career statistics ==
Appearances and goals by club, season and competition
Club	Season	Division	League		FA Cup		Total	
Club	Season	Division	Apps	Goals	Apps	Goals	Apps	Goals
Newcastle United	1934–35	Second Division	2	0	0	0	2	0
Newcastle United	1936–37	Second Division	7	2	0	0	7	2
Newcastle United	1937–38	Second Division	12	1	0	0	12	1
Newcastle United career total			21	3	0	0	21	3
Tranmere Rovers	1938–39	Second Division	31	7	0	0	31	7
Career total			52	10	0	0	52	10
