= Dimensional Obsessive–Compulsive Scale =

Self-report instrument

The Dimensional Obsessive–Compulsive Scale (DOCS) is a 20-item self-report instrument that assesses the severity of obsessive–compulsive disorder (OCD) symptoms along four empirically supported theme-based dimensions: (a) contamination, (b) responsibility for harm and mistakes, (c) incompleteness/symmetry, and (d) unwelcome thoughts. The scale was developed in 2010 by a team of experts on OCD led by Jonathan Abramowitz, PhD to improve upon existing OCD measures and advance the assessment and understanding of OCD. The DOCS contains four subscales (corresponding to the four symptom dimensions) that have been shown to have good reliability, validity, diagnostic sensitivity, and sensitivity to treatment effects in a variety of settings cross-culturally and in different languages. As such, the DOCS meets the needs of clinicians and researchers who wish to measure current OCD symptoms or assess changes in symptoms over time (e.g., over the course of treatment).

== Rationale ==
The DOCS was developed primarily because of the need for a measure of obsessive–compulsive (OC) symptoms that maps on to empirically established OC symptom dimensions (or "subtypes") in a conceptually consistent manner. Research consistently finds that OC symptoms distill into the following theme-based dimensions:

- Contamination – Consisting of obsession about germs, illness, and disgust along with avoidance of contaminants and washing and cleaning (i.e., de-contamination) compulsive rituals.
- Responsibility for harm or mistakes – Consisting of obsessional doubts and ideas of possibly having caused or failed to prevent harm, misfortune, bad luck (to oneself or others) along with checking and re-assurance seeking rituals.
- Unwelcome thoughts – Consisting of recurrent, highly distressing and subjectively repugnant obsessional thoughts, doubts, images, and ideas of "taboo" topics such as violence, immorality, sex, religion, existentialism, and blasphemy. These obsessions are typically accompanied by avoidance behavior as well as compulsive checking, repeating behaviors, mental rituals, and excessive re-assurance seeking.
- Incompleteness – Obsessions involving not-just-right experiences and the sense of incompleteness or asymmetry, sometimes accompanied by the fear of causing harm or bad luck; and ordering/arranging and repeating rituals.

A second aim of the DOCS was to address important drawbacks of widely used measures of OCD (such as the Yale–Brown Obsessive–Compulsive Scale [Y-BOCS], Obsessive–Compulsive Inventory [OCI and OCI-R] and Padua Inventory [PI and PI-R]). The limitations of these instruments include:

- Bias toward assessing the most common OCD symptoms – OCD is a highly heterogeneous disorder with obsessions and compulsions that can take many forms and themes. Many OCD measures are weighted toward assessing the most common (quintessential) types of obsession and compulsions (e.g., contamination obsessions, washing/cleaning compulsions). Thus, all things being equal, individuals with the more common types of OCD symptoms (e.g., washing and checking) will receive higher scores than patients with other (less common but equally severe) types of symptoms (e.g., religious obsessions/scrupulosity).
- Restricted conceptualization of severity – Most self-report OCD scales contain a one-dimensional assessment of severity. On some scales, for example, respondents simply rate their level of “distress” associated with various types of obsessions and compulsions. Research, however, shows that OCD symptom severity consists of multiple parameters such as distress, interference in functioning, and the frequency or duration of obsessions and compulsions
- Assessment of obsessions separately from compulsions – Many OCD symptom measures assess obsessions separately from compulsions, thus treating these symptoms as disconnected clinical phenomena. Yet research shows that obsessions and compulsions are related to one another. Moreover, OCD symptoms occur along thematic dimensions (or subtypes) that include both obsessions and compulsive rituals. Thus, many measures do not provide clinicians and researchers with the proper conceptual framework for best understanding and treating OCD symptoms.
- Failure to assess avoidance – Most OCD symptom measures do not capture avoidance behavior, which is a major symptom for many people with OCD. People with OCD who do not have many compulsions, for example, often have extensive avoidance patterns that contribute to the overall severity and interference in functioning associated with the disorder.
- Inclusion of hoarding – Until recently, hoarding was considered (by many experts) as a symptom of OCD; yet it is now known to be a separate condition. Many OCD symptom measures include items that assess hoarding in their overall severity score. Thus, these instruments overestimate OCD symptom severity among individuals with hoarding behaviors.

Accordingly, the DOCS:

- assesses the severity of research-supported OCD symptom dimensions (excluding hoarding) in a conceptually consistent manner,
- measures symptom severity as a function of multiple parameters,
- includes an assessment of avoidance behavior,
- assesses symptom severity independent of the number, range, or types of different obsessions and compulsions, and
- is fairly brief and easy to administer in clinical and research settings with both clinical and nonclinical populations.

== Development, scoring, and evaluation ==
=== Development ===
Items for the DOCS were generated on the basis of research on the dimensionality of OCD symptoms as well as on the parameters of OCD symptom severity. After writing an initial draft of scale items and instructions, the DOCS authors obtained feedback regarding the clarity, reading level, and relevance of these materials from a larger group of (a) experts on OCD, (b) experts on scale development, and (c) people with OCD. Following the incorporation of input from these groups, the final product was a self-report instrument consisting of 20 items; five items for each of the four symptom dimensions (subscales) as described above: (a) contamination, (b) responsibility for harm, injury, or bad luck, (c) unwelcome obsessional thoughts, and (d) symmetry, completeness, and exactness. Hoarding was excluded for the reasons mentioned previously.

DOCS items were worded based on the research-supported idea that obsessions and compulsions are universal experiences, occurring in clinical and nonclinical individuals on a continuum of severity. This allows the DOCS to be viable in both clinical and nonclinical populations.

An analysis of the item reading level revealed that the DOCS is easily understandable for people aged 13–15 years and above or who read at about a 9th-grade level.

=== Administration and scoring ===
Each of the four DOCS subscales begins with a general description and broad inclusive examples of the obsessions and compulsions within the particular symptom dimension. Respondents are next asked to consider any obsessions and compulsions within that symptom dimension that they have experienced within the last month and rate (on a scale from 0 [no symptoms] to 4 [extreme symptoms]) (a) the time occupied by obsessions and compulsions, (b) avoidance behavior, (c) associated distress, (d) functional interference, and (e) difficulty disregarding the obsessions and refraining from the compulsions. Thus, the DOCS subscales assesses the severity of the patient's own symptoms, rather than pre-defined symptoms as in most OCD measures.

Scoring is straightforward and produces three complementary indices:

1. Subscale Scores (0–20): Sum the five items within each symptom dimension. These scores indicate the severity of symptoms within each dimension.
2. DOCS Total Score (DOCS-Total; 0–80): Sum all 20 items, or equivalently, the four subscale scores. DOCS-Total reflects the overall burden of OCD symptoms across dimensions.
3. Highest Subscale Score (DOCS-Main; 0–20): Identify the highest of the four subscale scores. DOCS-Main reflects symptom severity within the individual’s most prominent OCD dimension and may provide a better approximation of global OCD severity when symptoms are concentrated in one dimension.

=== Interpreting DOCS Scores ===
Research has established empirically derived benchmarks for classifying OCD symptom severity. In a study of 1,992 adults diagnosed with OCD, DOCS scores were compared with severity classifications from the Yale–Brown Obsessive Compulsive Scale (Y-BOCS). The findings supported three severity categories: subclinical, mild–moderate, and severe.

Severity Classification	DOCS-Total (0–80)	DOCS-Main (0–20)
Subclinical	0–12	0–7
Mild–Moderate	13–41	8–15
Severe	42–80	16–20

DOCS-Total and DOCS-Main provide complementary information. DOCS-Total captures the combined burden of symptoms across dimensions, whereas DOCS-Main reflects the severity of the most prominent symptom dimension. Research indicates that DOCS-Main is more strongly associated with clinician-rated OCD severity and generally performs better in distinguishing among severity levels. We therefore recommend considering both indices, along with the individual subscale scores, when interpreting results.

A DOCS total score of 18 optimally distinguishes between someone with OCD and someone without a psychiatric diagnosis; while a score of 21 optimally distinguishes between someone with OCD and someone with an anxiety disorder. As of this time, there are no empirically derived cutoff scores for mild, moderate, or severe OCD symptoms.

=== Psychometric evaluation ===
In the initial study describing the development and evaluation of the DOCS, the instrument's factorial validity was supported by exploratory and confirmatory factor analyses of 3 samples, including (a) individuals with OCD, (b) those with other anxiety disorders, and (c) non treatment-seeking individuals. Scores on the DOCS displayed excellent performance on indices of reliability (test-retest, internal consistency) and validity (convergent, divergent, construct), and the measure appears to be sensitive to treatment. The DOCS is also diagnostically sensitive and thus holds promise as a useful measure of OCD symptoms in clinical and research settings.

The factor structure and psychometric properties of the DOCS have been examined in numerous studies in different cultures and languages, and via different methods of administration. Largely, these studies indicate that the scale's properties are consistent cross-culturally and regardless of how it is administered.

== Uses and translations ==
=== Uses ===
As the DOCS was developed with both clinical and non-clinical samples, it is suitable for use in service delivery settings as well as in research with both treatment-seeking and non-treatment-seeking samples. As it was developed and tested using adults, the DOCS is suitable for individuals age 18 and up. A version for those under 18 is currently in development.

As a self-report instrument, the DOCS requires no special skills to administer. However, interpretation of scores should be carried out by individuals with appropriate training in psychological science. When it is administered to people who have sought professional help, or who are displaying high levels of distress, interpretation should be carried out by appropriately qualified professionals such as a clinical psychologist.

The DOCS is widely used in clinical research on the nature of obsessions and compulsions. It is also used in treatment outcome studies as a measure to evaluate the effects of treatment for OCD.

=== Permission to use ===
The copyright for the DOCS belongs to Jonathan Abramowitz, PhD., yet the questionnaire is freely available and may be downloaded from the DOCS website. The scale may be used in paper and pencil form, or made available electronically, with the restrictions that: (a) the items and instructions are not modified, (b) it is not used or sold for profit (permission from Dr. Abramowitz is required to use the DOCS for profit), (c) it is used in unfunded research or clinical assessment in health care settings (permission from Dr. Abramowitz is required to use the DOCS in any industry sponsored clinical study), and (d) the DOCS is cited in research papers as follows:

Abramowitz, J. S.; Deacon, B.; Olatunji, B.; Wheaton, M. G.; Berman, N.; Losardo, D.; Timpano, K.; McGrath, P.; Riemann, B.; Adams, T.; Bjorgvinsson, T.; Storch, E. A.; Hale, L. (2010). "Assessment of obsessive–compulsive symptom dimensions: Development and evaluation of the Dimensional Obsessive–Compulsive Scale". Psychological Assessment. 22 (1): 180–198. doi:10.1037/a0018260. PMID 20230164. S2CID 7206349.

=== Translations and downloads ===
An administration, scoring, and interpretation manual for the DOCS is available from the DOCS website.

The DOCS is now available in the following languages: English, Spanish, Japanese, Chinese, Korean, Italian, French, Icelandic, Swedish, German, Norwegian, Bengali, Dutch, Turkish, Arabic, and Portuguese. All available versions of the DOCS are free to download at https://docs.web.unc.edu/downloads-and-translations/.
