= Doc (nickname) =

Doc or, less commonly, The Doc is the nickname of:

== American Old West ==
- William Frank Carver (1851–1927), American sharpshooter and Wild West show producer
- Doc Holliday (1851–1887), American gunfighter, gambler and dentist
- Doc Maynard (1808–1873), American pioneer and businessman, founder of Seattle
- Doc Scurlock (1849–1929), American cowboy and gunfighter

== Athletics ==
- Doc Adams (1814–1899), American baseball player and executive
- Doc Adkins (1872–1934), American baseball player
- Doc Alexander (1897–1975), American NFL football player and coach
- Doc Amole (1878–1912), American baseball player
- Doc Ayers (1891–1968), American baseball player
- Darrel Baldock (1938–2011), Australian rules football player and coach and politician nicknamed "The Doc"
- Doc Baker (died c. early 1920s), African-American football player
- Doc Bass (1898–1970), American baseball player
- Doc Bennett (1891–1974), American baseball player and manager
- Doc Blanchard (1924–2009), American football player and fighter pilot
- Sid "Doc" Brooks (1935–2007), American equipment manager
- Doc Casey (1870–1936), American Major League Baseball player and manager
- Matthew Clarke (Australian footballer) (born 1973), retired
- Doc Cook (baseball) (1886–1973), American Major League Baseball player
- L. J. Cooke (1868–1943), American college men's basketball coach
- Doc Crandall (1887–1951), American Major League Baseball player, the first used consistently as a relief pitcher
- Donald Dann (1949–2005), Australian Paralympic athlete
- Seán Doherty (Gaelic footballer) (born 1947), Irish former Gaelic football manager and player
- Ed Dougherty (born 1947), American golfer
- Doc Edwards (1936–2018), American Major League Baseball player
- Mike Emrick (born 1946), American hockey broadcaster
- Julius Erving (born 1950), American basketball player
- Doc Gautreau (1901–1970), American Major League Baseball player and manager
- Doc Gessler (1880–1924), American Major League Baseball player
- Dwight Gooden (born 1964), American Major League Baseball pitcher
- Doctor Greenwood (1860–1951), English footballer
- Roy Halladay (1977–2017), American Major League Baseball pitcher
- Dick Hoblitzell (1888–1962), American Major League Baseball player
- Arthur Irwin (1858–1921), Canadian-American Major League Baseball player and manager
- Jack Kearns (1882–1963), American boxing manager, most notably for Jack Dempsey
- Allan Kwartler (1917–1998), American sabre and foil fencer
- Doc Lawson (born 1958), American soccer player
- Doc MacKenzie (1906–1936), American race car driver
- Doc McJames (1874–1901), American baseball player and physician
- Walter Meanwell (1884–1953), college men's basketball coach
- Doc Medich (born 1948), American baseball player
- Cary Middlecoff (1921–1998), American golfer and dentist
- Donald Minnegan (1902–2002), coach and athletic director at Towson University
- Gil Morgan (born 1946), American golfer
- Harold Nicholls (1897–1977), New Zealand rugby football player
- Danell Nicholson (born 1967), American former boxer
- Donncha O'Callaghan (born 1979), Irish rugby union footballer
- Derek Pace (1932–1989), English footballer
- Doc Powers (1870–1909), American Major League Baseball player and physician
- Doc Prothro (1893–1971), American Major League Baseball player and manager and dentist
- Doc Redman (born 1997), American golfer
- Ross Reynolds (1887–1970), American Major League Baseball pitcher
- Doc Rivers (born 1961), American National Basketball Association player and coach
- Johnny Rutherford (baseball) (1925–2016), Canadian Major League Baseball pitcher
- Harry Sage (1864–1947), American Major League Baseball player
- Homer Smoot (1878–1928), American Major League Baseball player
- Gary Wiggins (1952–2008), Australian cyclist nicknamed "The Doc"
- Doc Wise (born 1967), American football player
- George Yeager (1874–1940), American Major League Baseball player

== Arts and entertainment ==
- Doc Bagby (1917–1970), American musician
- Doc Brown (rapper) (born 1980), British rapper and comedian
- Doc Cheatham (1905–1997), American jazz trumpeter, singer and bandleader
- Doc Guidry (1918–1992), American Cajun and country music fiddler
- George Hager (1885–?), American illustrator and newspaper editorial cartoonist
- Doc Hammer, American musician and writer of The Venture Bros
- Harold L. Humes (1926–1992), American writer and activist
- Charles Kuhn (1892–1989), American cartoonist
- Doc Neeson (1947–2014), Irish-born Australian rock singer
- Doc Pomus (1925–1991), American blues singer and songwriter
- David G. Robinson (theatre pioneer), 19th century theatrical pioneer in Northern California
- Doc Searls (born 1947), American journalist, author and blogger
- Doc Severinsen (born 1927), American trumpeter and bandleader
- Doc Shaw (born 1992), American actor, singer and rapper
- Neil Simon (1927–2018), American playwright and screenwriter
- E. E. Smith (1890–1965), American science fiction writer
- Doc Watson (1923–2012), American musician and songwriter

== Crime ==
- Arthur Barker (1899–1939), American criminal, son of Ma Barker and a member of the Barker-Karpis gang
- Ruben Cavazos (born 1957), American criminal, former International President of the Mongols Motorcycle Club
- James Henry Dolan (1914–1994), American criminal

== Military ==
- John Bahnsen (born 1934), retired US Army brigadier general
- Donald E. Ballard (born 1945), American retired colonel and Medal of Honor recipient
- John Bradley (United States Navy) (1923–1994), US Navy corpsman who participated in the raising of the flag on Iwo Jima
- Donald M. Carpenter (1894–1940), early US Navy aviator
- Ivan Dougherty (1907–1998), Australian Army major general
- Ralph Eaton (1898–1986), US Army brigadier general
- Robert H. Foglesong (born 1945), retired US Air Force general
- Robert R. Ingram (born 1945), retired US Navy sailor and recipient of the Medal of Honor
- Charles R. Jennison (1834–1888), American Civil War colonel and anti-slavery activist
- Rick Jolly (1946–2018), former Royal Navy surgeon-captain nicknamed "The Doc"
- Wheeler Bryson Lipes (1920–2005), US Navy pharmacist's mate who performed the first major surgery aboard a submarine
- Harold Anthony Oaks (1896–1968), Canadian World War I flying ace
- Lewis Powell (conspirator) (1844–1865), Confederate soldier hanged for his part in the Abraham Lincoln assassination plot
- Alfred V. Rascon (born 1945), US Army retired lieutenant colonel and Medal of Honor recipient
- William P. Sanders (1833–1863), Union Army officer during the American Civil War

== Politics and government ==
- A. A. Ames (1842–1911), American politician
- David O. Cooke (1920–2002), American government administrator
- Charles Edgar Edgett (1883–1947), Canadian police chief and anti-communist
- H. V. Evatt (1894–1965), Australian politician
- Tākuta Ferris (born 1978), New Zealand politician
- Doc Hastings (born 1941), American politician
- Robert Newell (politician) (1807–1869), American politician, fur trapper and frontier doctor
- Dennis O'Keefe (politician), former mayor of St. John's, Newfoundland and Labrador, Canada

== Other ==
- John W. A. "Doc" Buyers (1928–2006), American business executive
- Maurice Ewing (1906–1974), American geophysicist and oceanographer
- Michael Keiner (born 1959), German poker player and plastic surgeon nicknamed "The Doc"
- Doc Quigg (1911–1998), American journalist
- Maynard Jack Ramsay (1914–2005), American entomologist
- George M. Willing (1829–1874), American physician, prospector, and political lobbyist

== See also ==
- Dock (given name)
- François Duvalier (1907–1971), President of Haiti nicknamed "Papa Doc"
- Jean-Claude Duvalier (1951–2014), President of Haiti nicknamed "Baby Doc", son of François Duvalier
- Doctor (disambiguation)
