= Floating dock =

A floating dock may refer to a number of constructions found in ports and harbours

- Floating dock (impounded), a development of the half tide dock, where pumps or river flow are used to maintain the dock at around the high tide level of a nearby tidal waterway
- Floating dock (jetty), a lightweight quay or jetty, floating on pontoons, that rises and falls with the tide and shipping
- Floating dry dock, a portable dry dock that may be towed into place
- Auxiliary floating drydock of the United States Navy
