= David Ben Moshe =

Israeli author

David Ben Moshe is a United States-born Israeli author, speaker, and fitness coach. He discovered Judaism while in prison, and subsequently converted to Orthodox Judaism and made aliyah.

== Life in America ==
Ben Moshe was born David Bonett in rural Maryland to an evangelical Christian family. He told The Jewish Chronicle that while in college in Washington, D.C., "I would go to parties and people would ask me to buy drugs because I’m black. When I’d walk the streets, people would sell to me, just because I’m black." Ben Moshe was subsequently imprisoned for dealing oxycodone and unlicensed firearms. While imprisoned, he met a fellow inmate who was studying Torah in the prison library, thus introducing him to Judaism. Released after serving 21 months of a 30-month sentence, Ben Moshe joined B’nai Israel Synagogue in Baltimore, Maryland.

He opened a personal training studio and enrolled at Towson University, where he became active in the campus's Hillel chapter. After the University of Florida denied Ben Moshe the opportunity to enroll for graduate classes due to his criminal record, he decided to study at the Pardes Institute of Jewish Studies in Jerusalem.

== Aliyah and citizenship ==
In Jerusalem he met his future wife, Tamar Gresser. He applied for Israeli citizenship in 2018, but his application was subjected to what Tablet called "some of the worst of Israeli bureaucracy." His struggles to become an Israeli citizen, despite his prior conversion to Orthodoxy and his marriage to and children with Gresser, were widely covered in the media. The Immigration and Population Authority granted him temporary citizenship in 2021. In 2022, he conducted a hunger strike outside the Interior Ministry office, pausing three times a day to pray at the Western Wall, to persuade the ministry to grant him full citizenship. He ended it after five days, when the ministry delivered a written promise to do so by 2023. The Times of Israel reported that Ben Moshe had been made a citizen in January 2023.

Ben Moshe is a graduate of the NYU American Journalism Online Master's Program. He is a jiu-jitsu practitioner who has won his category at the Jiu-Jitsu World Championships in Tokyo. He lives in Be'er Sheva with Gresser and their three children. He publishes on one of the blogs of The Times of Israel and his writings have appeared in Jewish Journal, Newsweek, and The Tel Aviv Review of Books.
