= Osteomyology =

Type of alternative medicine

Osteomyology (sometimes neurosteomyology) is a multi-disciplined form of alternative medicine found almost exclusively in the United Kingdom and is loosely based on aggregated ideas from other manipulation therapies, principally chiropractic and osteopathy. It is a results-based physical therapy tailored specifically to the needs of the individual patient. Osteomyologists have been trained in osteopathy and chiropractic, but do not require to be regulated by the General Osteopathic Council (GOsC) or the General Chiropractic Council (GCC).

== Origin and philosophy ==
The term osteomyology was invented by an English born doctor of osteopathy, Dr Sir Alan Clemens, in 1992. This name was created the name from the joining of osteon = bone, myo = muscle and ology, a study. This name was given to those who joined an informal group of qualified osteopaths and students. This group was formed to satisfy a need for 'Continuing Professional Development' (CPD) with masterclasses on technique. It was intended to allow students to learn and for the qualified to improve upon basic as well as advanced techniques. Up to that time it was felt the existing official organizations of Osteopathy and Chiropractic did not organize such training well.

In 1993 The Osteopaths Act was passed followed by the Chiropractic Act 1994 requiring all chiropractors and osteopaths to be registered with new governing bodies. The new acts were not universally welcomed by the grassroots of the professions. The acts protected the titles of osteopath and chiropractor to those registered with the new organisations. The techniques used by osteopaths and chiropractors are not protected by the acts and may be used by osteomyologists as long as they do not describe themselves as osteopaths or chiropractors.

=== Objection on the basis of requalification ===
Many osteomyologists were qualified under previous non-statutory schemes. The new General Osteopathic Council set a level playing field allowing application from anyone who had been practicing as an osteopath. Previous qualification, experience, clinical reasoning was to be assessed via a professional portfolio of evidence. This process was not universally popular and some osteopaths resented the requirement to re-prove their eligibility for registration. However the portfolio was required of all osteopaths including those graduating within the transitional period. Some chose not to register and some failed to fulfill the requirements and after interview and clinical assessment were refused registration. Some of those declining or failing to register became osteomyologists.

=== Objection on the basis of non representation ===
Some osteomyologists objected to the scale of fees charged by the General Osteopathic Council and claimed this did not offer them good value for money and gave this as a reason to not register. The primary purpose of a statutory registration body is to protect the public. Non registering osteopaths failed to see the value in this role. In its first creation the GOsC had the responsibility to represent and promote the profession so this claim has some merit however the promotion role was removed by legislation after the Foster Report.

== First General Osteopathic Council ==
The first General Osteopathic council was appointed by the Department of Health. It was considered by the osteomyologists and by the Democratic Osteopathic Council, not to be representative or democratic because it had been formed initially by invitation from only one existing training school of osteopathy. There had been serious differences between this school and the others over many years over the philosophy and practice that was taught. Only later did elections take place onto the new council.

By taking on the title osteomyologist, practitioners can advertise their various spinal manipulation without being in breach of the legislation because they did not claim to be osteopaths. However this means that their practice and behaviour is not subject to the Standards of Practice of either the GOsC or the GCC. The GOsC and GCC will not hear complaints about practitioners who are not registered with them so the protection offered to the patients of osteomyologists is less than that offered to osteopathic and chiropractic patients.

== Claimed differences from osteopathy ==
The practice of osteomyology claims to be different from osteopathy because

- It focused technique upon relaxing muscle rather than manipulating bone
- They believed this achieved the same objective as osteopathy in releasing stiff joints but was kinder to the patient.
- It meant the patient could be better brought in to take part in their own cure.
- It more effectively recruited the so-called placebo effect that all treatment, whether orthodox or alternative ultimately depend for much of their effect.

Both osteopathy and osteomyology lack any clear definition of scope and application so these distinctions are quite arbitrary. The main difference remains that osteopathy is a statutorily regulated health profession and osteomyology is a group of like-minded professionals operating outside a statutory regulatory framework.

Alan Clemens now runs the Association of Osteomyologists and provides professional insurance and marketing services for members. Members of the Association designate themselves with the letters MAO (Member of the Association of Osteomyologists) after their name. Members are expected to partake in continuing training programmes and can present evidence of ongoing training in any alternative medicine. The code of conduct is made public and there is a method by which members of the public can make concerns known about members. The organisation does not publish membership figures, but their site would suggest that there are several hundred members.

== Efficacy ==
There is no reliable evidence available regarding the effectiveness or risks of treatment given by osteomyologists as a distinct practice. However, there is a wide range of evidence regarding the efficacy of the various constituent manual therapies that osteomyology draws upon.

=== Effectiveness ===
In 1996, Ernst and Canter published a systematic review of the evidence base for various spinal manipulation techniques, including "chiropractors, osteopaths, physiotherapists and other healthcare providers mostly (but not exclusively) to treat musculoskeletal problems." They concluded,

In conclusion, we have found no convincing evidence from systematic reviews to suggest that SM is a recommendable treatment option for any medical condition. In several areas, where there is a paucity of primary data, more rigorous clinical trials could advance our knowledge.

However, from other reviews, there is some evidence that Chiropractic practices (when compared to sham treatments) show clinically significant improvements in short-term pain relief for acute low back pain. However, when compared with conventional treatments there were no significant benefits. There is some evidence that osteopathic treatment is helpful for low back pain. For other conditions, the evidence is not compelling.

=== Associated risks ===
Spinal manipulation is associated with frequent, mild and temporary adverse effects, including new or worsening pain or stiffness in the affected region. Rarely, spinal manipulation, particularly on the upper spine, can also result in complications that can lead to permanent disability or death. The incidence of these complications is unknown, due to rarity, high levels of under-reporting, and difficulty of linking manipulation to adverse effects such as stroke, and has been noted as a particular concern.

== Controversies ==
=== Legal status ===
Osteomyology is not a statutorily regulated form of alternative medicine but due to government legislation has opted for self-regulation. To become an osteomyologist, one must have a professional qualification in any of the physical/medical disciplines and applicants have to present their professional diplomas for scrutiny also abiding by the code of practice and ethics and registering full insurance cover. Only then may they join the TAO and call themselves osteomyologist. The newly formed UK voluntary regulation body, the Complementary and Natural Healthcare Council will not play any role in the regulation of osteomyologists. The Association of Osteomyologists is currently working on a framework for voluntary self-regulation for its members.

The Advertising Standards Authority concluded that the Association of Osteomyologists was not a statutory or recognised health and medical professional body and merely allowed osteomyologists to share knowledge.

=== Professional standards ===
The WHO states that the safety and quality of chiropractic practice depends mainly on the quality of training of the practitioner. As osteomyologists are often practitioners who refuse to be subject to statutory regulation regarding training and practice, it is difficult to ensure that their standards meet minimum guidelines. The Association of Osteomyologists claim to allow membership to anyone who has "degree qualifications in one of the physical medical disciplines". This is a much broader and looser requirement than the statutorily regulated profession of chiropractic.

=== Regulatory offenses ===
Osteomyologists have found themselves subject to various types of regulatory investigation. The Advertising Standards Authority has taken action against practitioners, for such offenses as making untruthful and unsubstantiated claims in advertising about the extent of scientific support for the therapy, or referring to serious medical conditions in their advertising. In November 2008, the Committee of Advertising Practice issued advice about the advertising from osteomyologists warning that they should not mislead on their status or training and that if they wanted to claim to offer manipulation or chiropractic techniques they must hold suitable, relevant qualifications to undertake such therapy and robust substantiation for the efficacy of claims for the therapy.

Several practitioners have been investigated by the General Osteopathic Council for advertising as osteopaths. The Times ran an investigation in 2004 into 'illegal chiropractors' and found many osteomyologists describing themselves as chiropractors to prospective customers.

A chiropractor being investigated by the General Chiropractic Council (GCC) for multiple instances of unprofessional conduct was found by the council to have "endeavoured to evade the GCC’s jurisdiction by denying that he is a chiropractor" calling himself instead an osteomyologist.

== See also ==
- Conventional medicine, alternative medicine and evidence-based medicine
- False advertising in health care
