= Dock (given name) =

Name list

Dock is a given name or nickname. Notable people with the name include:

- Dock Boggs (1898–1971), American folk singer and banjoist
- Dock Ellis (1945–2008), American baseball pitcher
- Dock J. Jordan (1866–1943), American lawyer and educator
- Dock Walsh (1901–1967), American banjoist

== See also ==
- Doc (nickname)
