= Documentation (disambiguation) =

Documentation is a set of documents provided on paper, or online, or on digital or analog media, such as audio tape or CDs.

Documentation may also refer to:

- Document, written or drawn representation of thoughts
- Documentation science, study of the recording and retrieval of information
- Bibliography, academic study of books as physical, cultural objects
- Software documentation, written text that accompanies computer software
