= Donald Minnegan =

- Born: August 26, 1902; Waterman, Illinois, U.S.
- Died: August 10, 2002 (aged 99)

Donald Minnegan (August 26, 1902 – August 10, 2002), more commonly known by his nickname Doc, was an American coach and athletic director at Towson University. He coached two championship soccer teams at Towson.

== Career ==
Minnegan received his teaching degree at a teachers college in Illinois in 1923 and graduated in 1927 from Springfield YMCA College. He came to the Maryland State Normal School in 1927 as the men's soccer coach, but was also the athletic director and coach for baseball, track, and basketball. He was instrumental in developing Baltimore County's recreation program.

Minnegan coached through one name change (Maryland State Normal School became Maryland State Teachers College) and two presidents (Lida Lee Tall and M. Theresa Wiedefeld) until 1941, when World War II began. Even though the war shipped off most of his team, he still found ways to coach them while overseas.

Because of this, the U.S. State Department and U.S. Army recognized his "strong philosophy toward physical fitness and his proven expertise in the field" and sent him to Europe to establish a physical fitness program, with an emphasis on soccer, for American servicemen.

Minnegan won 152 games during his 29-year tenure as the Tigers' coach.

== Recognition and awards ==
- Minnegan was inducted into Towson's Athletic Hall of Fame as a coach in 1992.
- His plaque is displayed in the National Soccer Hall of Fame in Oneonta, New York.
- Towson renamed their mascot "Doc" in his honor, along with their football field at Johnny Unitas Stadium.
