= GAS5 =

Non-coding RNA in humans

Identifiers
- Aliases: GAS5, NCRNA00030, SNHG2, growth arrest specific 5 (non-protein coding)
- External IDs: OMIM: 608280; GeneCards: GAS5

Gene location (Human)
Chr.	Chromosome 1 (human)
Band	1q25.1	Start	173,863,900 bp
Band	1q25.1	End	173,868,882 bp
RNA expression pattern
Bgee	Human / Mouse (ortholog); Top expressed in: left ovary; body of pancreas; right ovary; cartilage tissue; right uterine tube; canal of the cervix; skin of abdomen; ganglionic eminence; skin of arm; body of uterus / n/a; More reference expression data
BioGPS	n/a
Orthologs
Databases	NCBI: entry; OMA: entry
Species	Human	Mouse
Entrez	60674	n/a
Ensembl	ENSG00000234741	n/a
UniProt	n a	n/a
RefSeq (mRNA)	n/a	n/a
RefSeq (protein)	n/a	n/a
Location (UCSC)	Chr 1: 173.86 – 173.87 Mb	n/a
PubMed search		n/a
- Wikidata
View/Edit Human

Growth arrest-specific 5 is a non-protein coding RNA that in humans is encoded by the GAS5 gene.

== Gene ==
The GAS5 introns host several snoRNA sequences, including SNORD81, SNORD47, SNORD80, SNORD79, SNORD78, SNORD44, SNORD77, SNORD76, SNORD75 and SNORD74. These intronic sequences are more conserved than the exons of the host gene, these sorts of genes are often called "inside-out genes".

== Function ==
GAS5 noncoding RNA, which accumulates in growth arrested cells, acts as a decoy hormone response element for the glucocorticoid receptor (GR) and hence blocks the upregulation of gene expression by activated GR.

It was recently discovered that the nonsense-mediated degradation pathway can regulate the function of the GAS5 in mammalian cells.

== Clinical significance ==
A number of studies have linked GAS5 to apoptosis and it may play a role in the progression of some types of cancer.
