= DRDR =

DRDR and similar, may refer to:

- Dead Rising Deluxe Remaster (DRDR, DR-DR), a 2024 survival-horror videogame in the Dead Rising videogame series
- DooRooDooRoo Artist Company (DRDR AC, DRDR), South Korean record label
- Recording and replay server (d-rdr), a component of the Phoenix (ATC) air traffic control system
- Double doctorate (Dr. Dr.), see Doctor (title)
- Submarine U24 (S173), callsign DRDR; see Type 206 submarine

== See also ==
- Door, Door
- Door Door
- Medical doctor, a doctor doctor
- Doctor Doctor (disambiguation) (Dr. Dr.)
- DR2 (disambiguation)
- DR (disambiguation)
