= Small nucleolar RNA SNORD77 =

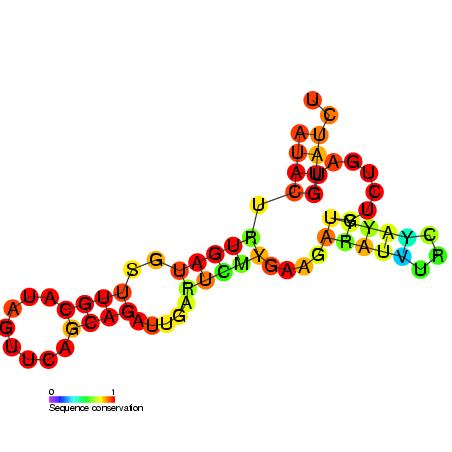
- Predicted secondary structure and sequence conservation of SNORD77

Identifiers
- Symbol: SNORD77
- Alt. Symbols: snoU77
- Rfam: RF00591

Other data
- RNA type: Gene; snRNA; snoRNA; C/D-box
- Domain: Eukaryota
- GO: GO:0006396 GO:0005730
- SO: SO:0000593
- PDB structures: PDBe

In molecular biology, SNORD77 (also known as U77) belongs to the C/D family of snoRNAs. It is predicted to guide 2'O-ribose methylation of large 28S rRNA subunit at position A1521. The C/D snoRNAs U44, U47, U74, U75, U76, U78, U79, U80 and U81 share the same host gene as U77 (non-coding).
