= U24 =

U24 may refer to:

- U-24 (association), an intergovernmental organization
- German submarine U-24, various vessels
- Helio AU-24 Stallion, an American utility transport aircraft
- Icosidodecahedron
- Small nucleolar RNA SNORD24
- United24, Ukrainian government-run fundraising platform
