= Doctor =

Doctor most often refers to:

- Medical doctor, a person who is qualified to practice medicine
- Doctor (title), an academic title granted to holders of a doctorate

Doctor, Doctors, The Doctor or The Doctors may also refer to:

== Arts and entertainment ==
=== Fictional characters ===
- The Doctor, the main character of the BBC series Doctor Who
- List of fictional doctors
- Doctor (comics), several fictional characters
- Doctor, in the film My Giant
- Doctor, in Black Cat
- The Doctor, in Hellsing
- The Doctor, in video game Cave Story
- The Doctor (Star Trek)
- The Doctor, or Scalpel, in the Transformers film series
- The Doctor or Cobra Commander, in G.I. Joe: A Real American Hero
- The Doctor, in Little Nightmares II
- Minoru Kamiya, also known as Doctor, in YuYu Hakusho
- The Doctor (Squid Game), also known as Byeong-yi or Player 111

=== Film ===
- Doctor (film series), British comedy films of the 1950s–1960s
- Doctor (1963 film), an Indian Malayalam-language film
- Doctor (2013 film), a South Korean horror film
- Doctor (2021 film), an Indian Tamil-language film
- Doctor (2023 film), a Russian drama
- The Doctor (1991 film), an American drama
- The Doctor (2013 film), about basketball player Julius Erving

=== Music ===
==== Groups ====
- Doctor (band), founded by Daniel Greaves
- Die Ärzte (German, 'The Doctors'), a German rock band

==== Albums ====
- The Doctor (Beenie Man album), 1999
- The Doctor (Cheap Trick album), 1986
- The Doctor, a 2005 album by Thomas Nöla
- Doctor (soundtrack), from the 2021 film

==== Songs ====
- "Doctor" (Loïc Nottet song), 2017
- "The Doctor" (Mary Wells song), 1968
- "The Doctor" (The Doobie Brothers song), 1989
- "Doctor (Work It Out)", a song by Pharrell Williams sung by Miley Cyrus, 2024
- "Doctor", a 2018 song by Chanmina
- "Doctor", a 2008 song by Cute Is What We Aim For

=== Television ===
==== Series ====
- Doctors (2000 TV series), a British medical soap opera
- Doctors (2024 TV series), an Indian medical drama
- The Doctor (1952 TV series), an American medical anthology series 1952–1953
- The Doctors (1963 TV series), an American soap opera 1963–1982
- The Doctors (1969 TV series), a British medical drama 1969–1971
- The Doctors (South Korean TV series), 2016
- The Doctors (talk show), 2008–2022

==== Episodes ====
- "Doctors" (Soupy Norman), 2007
- "The Doctor", Alcoa Premiere season 1, episode 16 (1962)
- "The Doctor", Bill the Minder episode 7 (1986)
- "The Doctor", Bluey, season 1, episode 18 (2018)
- "The Doctor", Broken Arrow season 1, episode 19 (1957)
- "The Doctor", part one of Doctor Who Greatest Moments, a 2009 clip show series related to Doctor Who
- "The Doctor", InSecurity season 1, episode 1 (2011)
- "The Doctor", Lawman season 4, episode 34 (1962)
- "The Doctor", Motive for Murder episode 4 (1957)
- "The Doctor" (Once Upon a Time) season 2, episode 5 (2012)
- "The Doctor", Ready Eddie Go! episode 19 (2023)
- "The Doctor", Spyforce episode 22 (1972)
- "The Doctor", The Adventures of Robin Hood season 3, episode 28 (1958)
- "The Doctor", The Life and Legend of Wyatt Earp season 6, episode 2 (1960)
- "The Doctor", The Secret World of Alex Mack season 4, episode 11 (1997)

=== Literature ===
- Doctors (novel), by Erich Segal, 1988
- Doctor (novel series), comic novels by Richard Gordon
- The Doctor: A Study from Life, an 1899 novel by Henry de Vere Stacpoole
- The Doctor, a 1906 novel by Ralph Connor
- The Doctor, a 1936 novel by Mary Roberts Rinehart
- James Miranda Barry, published in the US as The Doctor, a 1999 novel by Patricia Duncker
- The Doctor, a 2001 novel by Laura Spinney

=== Other uses in arts and entertainment ===
- The Doctor (painting), by Luke Fildes, 1891
- The Doctor (play), by Robert Icke, 2019
- "The Doctor", a 2002 episode of Internet animated short series DumbLand

== People ==
- The Doctor (nickname), including a list of people with nickname or stage name of "Doctor" or "The Doctor"
- Doctor Willard Bliss (1825–1889) (given name Doctor), American physician
- Doctor Greenwood (1860–1951) (given name Doctor), English footballer
- Sean Doctor (born 1966), American football player

== Other uses ==
- Doctor of the Church, prominent theologian in Catholic church
- Doctor (cocktail), a pre-prohibition era cocktail
- DOCTOR, a script for Joe Weizenbaum's program ELIZA, simulating a Rogerian psychotherapist
- El Doctor, a mountain range in Mexico
- Fremantle Doctor, or the Doctor, a Western Australian afternoon sea breeze
- Photograph manipulation, in which manipulated photographs are often referred to as "doctored"
- The Doctors, a lifeboat at Anstruther Lifeboat Station 1965–1991

== See also ==
- Doctor Doctor (disambiguation)
- DR (disambiguation)
- Doc (disambiguation)
- Docter (disambiguation)
- Doktor (disambiguation)
- El Médico (disambiguation)
- Daktari, an American family drama TV series 1966–1969
- Doctores metro station, in Mexico City, Mexico
