= Small nucleolar RNA SNORD75 =

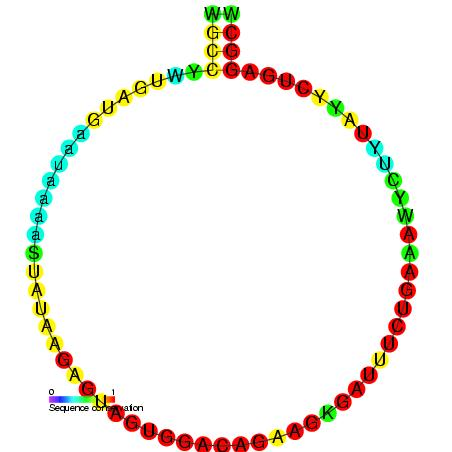
- Predicted secondary structure and sequence conservation of SNORD75

Identifiers
- Symbol: SNORD75
- Rfam: RF00612

Other data
- RNA type: Gene; snRNA; snoRNA; C/D-box
- Domain: Eukaryota
- GO: GO:0006396 GO:0005730
- SO: SO:0000593
- PDB structures: PDBe

In molecular biology, Small Nucleolar RNA SNORD75 (also known as U75) is a non-coding RNA (ncRNA) molecule which functions in the biogenesis (modification) of other small nuclear RNAs (snRNAs). This type of modifying RNA is located in the nucleolus of the eukaryotic cell which is a major site of snRNA biogenesis. It is known as a small nucleolar RNA (snoRNA) and also often referred to as a guide RNA.

U75 (SNORD75) belongs to the C/D box class of snoRNAs which contain the C (UGAUGA) and D (CUGA) box motifs. Most of the members of the box C/D family function in directing site-specific 2′-O-methylation of substrate RNAs. The mouse snoRNA Z19 is orthologous to human U75. U75 is predicted to guide the 2′-O-ribose methylation of 28S ribosomal RNA (rRNA) residue C4032. In humans U75 shares the same non-protein coding host gene (gas5) with 9 other snoRNAs (U44, U47, U74, U76, U77, U78, U79, U80 and U81).
