= Small nucleolar RNA SNORD78 =

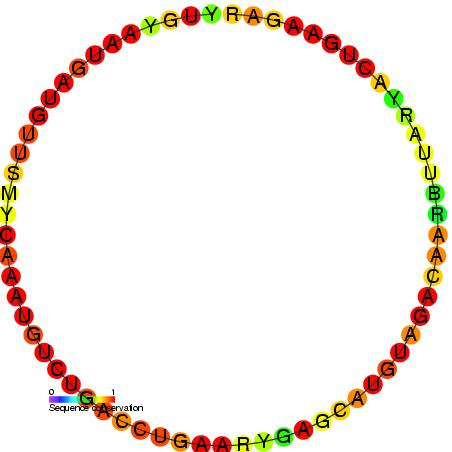
- Predicted secondary structure and sequence conservation of SNORD78

Identifiers
- Symbol: SNORD78
- Alt. Symbols: snoU78
- Rfam: RF00592

Other data
- RNA type: Gene; snRNA; snoRNA; C/D-box
- Domain: Eukaryota
- GO: GO:0006396 GO:0005730
- SO: SO:0000593
- PDB structures: PDBe

In molecular biology, SNORD78 (also known as U78) belongs to the C/D family of snoRNAs. It is predicted to guide 2'O-ribose methylation of the large 28S rRNA subunit at position G4593. The snoRNAs U44, U47, U74, U75, U76, U77, U79, U80 and U81, also of the C/D family, share the same host gene with U78 (protein non-coding).
