= U78 =

U78 may refer to:

- CBEFT, a television station in Windsor, Ontario, Canada
- German submarine U-78, various vessels
- Small nucleolar RNA SNORD78
- U78, a line of the Düsseldorf Stadtbahn
