= Dostaler =

Dostaler is a Canadian surname. Notable people with the surname include:

- Edward Dostaler (born 1988), Canadian charity runner
- Omer Dostaler (1849–1925), Canadian politician
- Pierre-Eustache Dostaler (1809–1884), Canadian politician
- Theresa Dostaler, Canadian hockey activist

== See also ==
- Émile-Dostaler O'Leary (1908–1965), Canadian journalist and writer
- Dostler
