= U44 =

U44 may refer to:

- German submarine U-44, various vessels
- HMAS Parramatta (U44), a sloop of the Royal Australian Navy
- Icosidodecadodecahedron
- Small nucleolar RNA SNORD44
- U44, a line of the Dortmund Stadtbahn
