= U81 =

U80 may refer to:

- German submarine U-81, various vessels
- HMS Stork (U81), a sloop of the Royal Navy
- Small nucleolar RNA SNORD81
- U81, a planned line of the Düsseldorf Stadtbahn
