= Doktor =

Doktor ('Doctor', in several languages) may refer to:

- Martin Doktor (born 1974), Czech canoeist
- Martin Doktor (footballer) (1981–2004), Slovak footballer
- Paul Doktor (1917–1989), Austrian violist and orchestra conductor
