= El Médico (disambiguation) =

El Médico (Spanish, 'The Doctor') is the nickname of Cuban singer Reynier Casamayor Griñán.

El Médico may also refer to:

- Médico Asesino (Cesáreo Anselmo Manríquez González, 1920–1960), known by the ring names Médico Asesino and later El Médico, Mexican wrestler and actor
- El Médico – the Cubaton Story, a 2011 documentary by Daniel Fridell about Reynier Casamayor Griñán
- The Doctor (El Médico), a work by Francisco Goya

== See also ==
- Doctor (disambiguation)
- El Doctor, a mountain range in Mexico
