= Dostler =

Dostler is a German surname. Notable people with the surname include:

- Anton Dostler (1891–1945), German general executed for war crimes
- Eduard Ritter von Dostler (1892–1917), German fighter ace

== See also ==
- Doster
- Dostaler
