= J17 =

J17 may refer to:

== Vehicles ==
=== Locomotives ===
- GSR Class J17, an Irish steam locomotive
- LNER Class J17, a British steam locomotive class

=== Ships ===
- HMS Speedy (J17), a Halcyon-class minesweeper of the Royal Navy
- INS Sutlej (J17), a Sandhayak-class survey ship of the Indian Navy

=== Aircraft ===
- CAC/PAC JF-17 Thunder, a Chinese-Pakistani supersonic jet fighter, sometimes erroneously called J-17 by analogy to other Chinese fighter aircraft

== Other uses ==
- County Route J17 (California)
- Gyroelongated square bipyramid, a Johnson solid (J_{17})
- Just Seventeen, a British magazine
- Small nucleolar RNA snR60/Z15/Z230/Z193/J17
- Pneumonia
