= Dockter =

Dockter is a surname. Notable people with the surname include:

- Jason Dockter (born 1973), American politician
- Warren Dockter (born 1982), British author and historian

== See also ==
- Docker (surname)
- Docter (disambiguation)
