= Doctor (comics) =

In comics, Doctor may refer to:

== Doctor or The Doctor ==
- The Doctor, the main character in a number of comic adventures chiefly in Doctor Who Magazine
- The Doctor, several characters in The Authority (comics) series
- Doctor Alchemy, a DC Comics supervillain and Flash rogue
- Doctor Angst, a Marvel Comics character and leader of the Band of the Bland
- Doctor Bedlam, a DC Comics supervillain and part of Jack Kirby's Fourth World
- Doctor Cyber, a DC Comics supervillain
- Doctor Death, a DC Comics supervillain and enemy of Batman
- Doctor Decibel, a Marvel Comics character
- Doctor Destiny, a DC Comics supervillain
- Doctor Doom, a Marvel Comics supervillain
- Doctor Doomsday, an Amalgam Comics character
- Doctor Druid, a Marvel Comics hero
- Doctor Fang, a DC Comics character
- Doctor Faustus, a Marvel Comics supervillain associated with Captain America
- Doctor Fate, a DC Comics superhero
- Doctor Gorpon, a Malibu Comics character
- Doctor Impossible, a DC Comics supervillain
- Doctor Light, a number of DC Comics characters of a similar name
- Doctor McNinja from The Adventures of Dr. McNinja
- Doctor Manhattan, a DC Comics character from Watchmen
- Doctor Mid-Nite, a DC Comics superhero
- Doctor John Miers PHD, an all-round Comics hero
- Doctor Mirage, a Valiant Comics character
- Doctor Mist, a DC Comics superhero
- Doctor Nemesis, two Marvel Comics characters: Dr. James Bradley, a scientist and co-inventor of the original Human Torch and Michael Stockton, a scientist who used Pym particles
- Doctor Occult, a DC Comics superhero
- Doctor Octopus, a Marvel Comics supervillain, known as an enemy of Spider-Man
- Doctor Phosphorus, a DC Comics supervillain
- Doctor Polaris, a DC Comics supervillain and enemy of Green Lantern
- Doctor Psycho, a DC Comics supervillain and enemy of Wonder Woman
- Doctor Shocker, a DC Comics supervillain and member of the 1000
- Doctor Sivana, a Fawcett and DC Comics supervillain
- Doctor Solar, a Valiant Comics superhero
- Doctor Spectro, a Charlton and DC Comics supervillain
- Doctor Spectrum, a number of different Marvel Comics characters
- Doctor Strange, a Marvel Comics superhero
- Doctor Sun, a Marvel Comics supervillain
- Doctor Thirteen, a DC Comics superhero
- Doctor Tomorrow, an Acclaim Comics series and a character in the game Freedom City
- Doctor Vault, a Marvel Comics character
- Doctor Voodoo, also known as Brother Voodoo, a Marvel Comics hero.
- Doctor X, a Nedor Comics character who returned in Terra Obscura
- Doctor Zodiac, a DC Comics character from World's Finest Comics

== Doc ==
- Doc, a member of the Omega Men
- Doc (G.I. Joe), a G.I. Joe character who has appeared in the comic book spin-offs
- Doc Samson, a Marvel Comics superhero
- Doc Savage, a character who has appeared in a number of comics
- Doc Strange, a Nedor Comics character who reappeared in Terra Obscura

== See also ==
- Doctor (disambiguation)
