= Cape Doctor =

South-easterly wind in Western Cape, South Africa

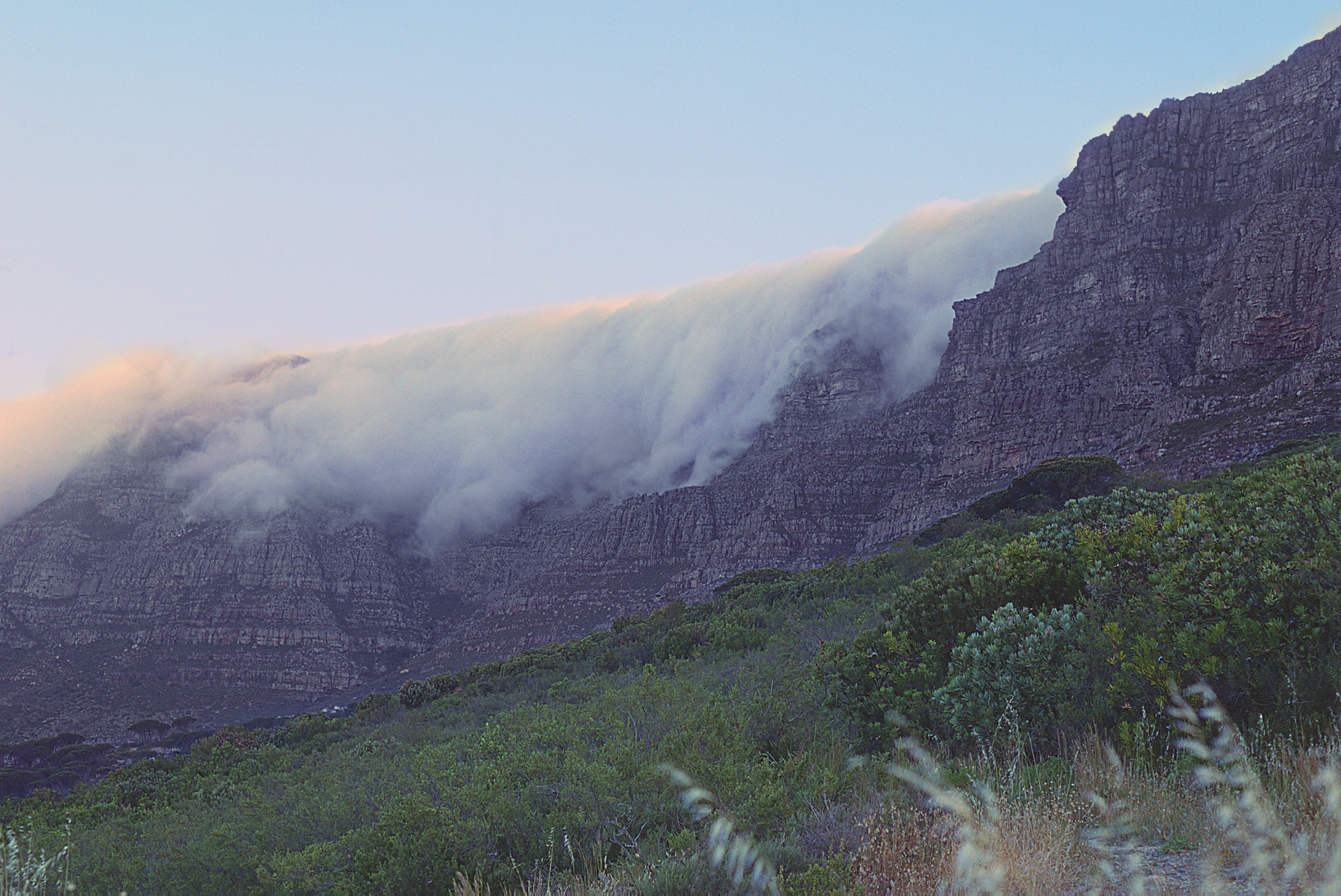
The commonly occurring cloud cover, also known as the "table cloth," on Table Mountain that is caused by the wind

"Cape Doctor," also known as the "Southeaster," is the local name for the strong, often persistent and dry south-easterly wind on the South African coast.

The Cape Doctor specifically refers to the wind that blows from spring to late summer (September to March in the southern hemisphere). It is known as the Cape Doctor because of a local belief that it clears Cape Town of pollution and 'pestilence'.

The term Southeaster is applied to the same wind, due to its consistent direction from the south-east. This is opposite to the north-westerly winds that blow in the same region in the winter months often ahead of a cold-front.

Both these terms are often used interchangeably by people in the region.

== Background ==
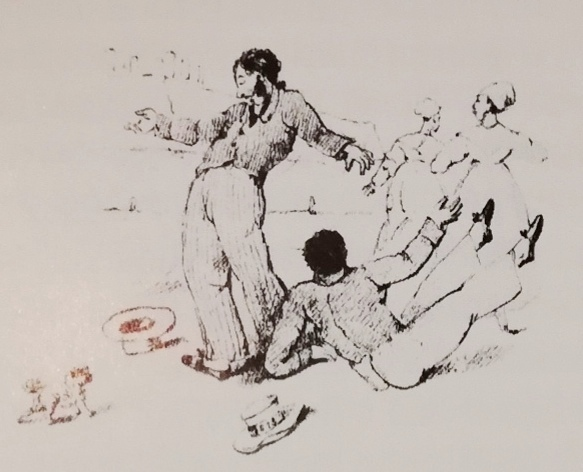
A historical depiction from the early 1800s of Capetonians being blown over by the Southeaster wind.

Although the wind blows over a wide area of the Western Cape Province, it is notorious especially in and around the Cape Peninsula, where it can be unpleasantly strong and irritating. Capetonians also call it "the South-Easter".

The South Easter is usually accompanied by fair weather. However, if the South-Easter is accompanied by a cut-off low as occasionally happens in the spring and autumn months, this can cause heavy rains to fall over the Western Cape. This phenomenon is popularly known as a Black South-Easter. The Laingsburg flood of January 1981 was caused by heavy rains as part of a Black South Easter.

It is ironic that the meteorological records for Cape Town show that the north-westerly winds of winter can be far stronger than the South-Easter, while these winds are not given such a positive name. This could be because the north-westerly winds are usually accompanied by rain, which can fall for days.

The wind is associated with the fairy tale of Jan Van Hunks and the Devil as it is the cause of the "table cloth," or cloud cover, on Table Mountain.

== See also ==
- Fremantle Doctor
- Southerly buster
- Backdoor cold front
