= Martin Doktor (footballer) =

Slovak footballer

Personal information
- Full name: Martin Doktor
- Date of birth: 26 September 1981
- Place of birth: Ilava, Czechoslovakia
- Date of death: 8 September 2004 (aged 22)
- Place of death: Dubodiel
- Height: 1.84 m (6 ft 1/2 in)
- Position: Left midfielder

Senior career*
Years	Team	Apps	(Gls)
?–2003	Nemšová		
2003–2004	ZTS Dubnica	?	(1)
- * Club domestic league appearances and goals as of 15 September 2011

Martin Doktor (born 26 September 1981 in Ilava – died 8 September 2004 in Dubodiel) was a Slovak football midfielder, who played as a midfielder. He died of congestive heart failure during the night of 7 to 8 September 2004, as the official date of death is given 8 September 2004.
