= Backdoor cold front =

Weather pattern

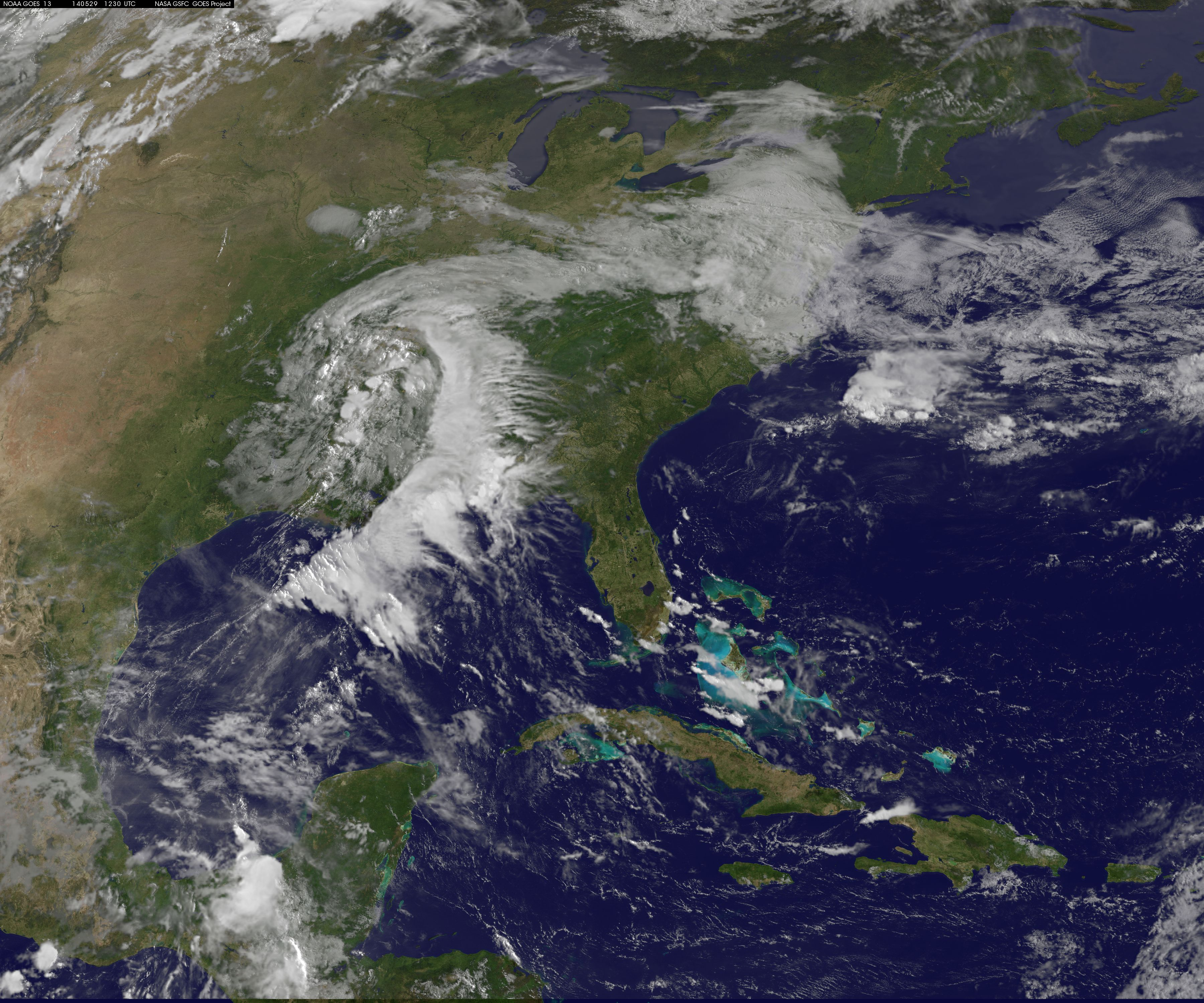
A backdoor cold front captured by satellite (top-right)

A backdoor cold front, or backdoor front, is a cold front moving south or southwest along the northeast of the Atlantic seaboard in North America, particularly in the New England region of United States and the Great Lakes. Typically occurring in spring, the front drives cool Atlantic air from the east or northeast into northeastern US that supersedes the warmer continental air. The front is termed "backdoor" because it arrives from the east, meaning it originates from the opposite direction of a typical cold front and therefore comes through the region's "back door."

== Formation ==
A backdoor cold front occurs when the clockwise motion around a high-pressure system pulls in colder air toward the south and west of it. This is where a synoptic wind motion creates a wind flow from the cool North Atlantic Ocean that brings in the backdoor front. A cold front, however, approaches from the north, northwest or west, and its wind direction will generally be from those directions (since most weather moves west to east), except this does not happen with a backdoor cold front. Rather, a back door cold front arrives from a particular direction, where it will move in an opposite direction, unlike a regular cold front.

In spring, the Atlantic ocean is still cool (below 50 °F (10 °C)), and hence the air above it is also cool. On occasion, that air can move south out of high pressure area in the Canadian Maritimes and southward down the New England coast or the northern states. The high pressure system's clockwise flow directs cold moist air southward and westward into Northeast US. The area where these two airmasses collide is illustrated by the frontal boundary in Northern New England (near the Gulf of Maine) and northern New Jersey. Low clouds develop along and behind the front. As a backdoor cold front withdraws, temperatures can rise rapidly.

== Characteristics ==
Relative movement of regular and backdoor cold front

Backdoor fronts would point toward the southeast direction, but they can alter, such as an east–west emplacement or may move towards the northeast if the cold front is encircling a subtropical cyclone. The leading boundary of this cold air forms a cold front, which is typically represented on surface analysis charts as a front aligned roughly east-west. The backdoor cold front may move towards the southwest or west. Heatwaves are frequently ended by a backdoor front – This is when temperatures are around 80 °F (27 °C), which is warm for May standards, whereby the front will lower the temperature down to around 50 °F (10 °C) by the next day.

During the spring months, when ocean temperatures of the Atlantic Ocean are still cool, backdoor fronts can drop temperatures by more than 20 °F (11 °C) in just a few hours, because their force is assisted by the cool, oceanic air mass that lies over the cool north Atlantic waters. They are mostly shallow, with much of the maritime air only reaching a few thousand feet aboveground and thus would rarely pass the over the Appalachian Mountains. The clouds associated with the backdoor cold front stretch from southern Illinois to North Carolina. Low clouds develop along and behind the front because such the front's winds usually come from the ocean, in addition to scattered showers, although the precipitation is mist and drizzle. Its effects may last a few hours or a couple of days, depending on the system.

== Areas affected ==
Back door cold fronts are common from southeast Canada to New Jersey, due to cool Atlantic water lingering near the coast in spring. They normally impact southeastern Canada (including Nova Scotia), the New England coast, south to the New Jersey coast. New York City feels the effects of backdoor cold fronts much less than Boston. The warm Gulf Stream prevents the cool onshore flow of the front, so regions from southeast Virginia southward are typically not impacted by backdoor cold fronts. Backdoor fronts can create contrasting temperatures between the seaboard and inland areas in spring and early summer – For instance, Boston may experience cloudy skies with temperatures hovering between 40 and 50 °F (4 and 10 °C), while Trenton, New Jersey, which is around 160 mi (250 km) to the southwest, might experience mild and sunny conditions with temperatures near 75 °F (24 °C).

=== Notable examples ===
On May 27, 2014, a backdoor cold front from southeast Canada came down the New England coast. Boston struggled to reach 50 °F (10 °C), when it was 79 °F (26 °C) two days earlier. Worcester set a record low-maximum on the May 28 when it had a high of 47 °F (8 °C), which was below the average high of 69 °F (21 °C). In New York City, after reaching a high of 86 °F (30 °C) on May 27, the high only reached 64 °F (18 °C) the next day after the front passed. Between May 28 and 29, maximum temperatures dropped from 83 °F (28 °C) to 59 °F (15 °C) at Harrisburg, Pennsylvania and from 88 °F (31 °C) down to 62 °F (17 °C) in Washington, DC.

On June 2, 2023, another backdoor cold front affected the region following two days of record warm highs. After Burlington, Vermont had a high of 96 °F (36 °C) on June 1 and 91 °F (33 °C) on June 2, the high topped out around 70 °F (21 °C) on June 3. Boston also had highs tumble from the mid-80s on June 2 to 57 °F (14 °C) on June 3. The backdoor cold front also led to rain in the region. High temperature drops of 10–20 °F (5.6–11.1 °C) were recorded as far as Philadelphia and Buffalo. Portions of Maine, including Portland and Bangor experienced 24-hour temperature drops of 40 °F (22 °C) or greater.

On March 29, 2025, after a warm front had moved northeast past New York City earlier in the day, the same front moved back southwest as a backdoor cold front later in the afternoon. Notable temperature drops were from 66 °F (19 °C) to 54 °F (12 °C) in five minutes at LaGuardia Airport, 79 °F (26 °C) to 68 °F (20 °C) in ten minutes at Hofstra University, and 79 °F (26 °C) to 53 °F (12 °C) in one hour at Central Park.

== See also ==
- Southerly buster
- Fremantle Doctor
- Cape Doctor
