= German submarine U-24 =

U-24 may refer to one of the following German submarines:

- SM U-24, was a Type U 23 submarine launched in 1913 and that served in the First World War until surrendered on 22 November 1918
  - During the First World War, Germany also had these submarines with similar names:
    - SM UB-24, a Type UB II submarine launched in 1915 and surrendered on 24 November 1918
    - SM UC-24, a Type UC II submarine launched in 1916 and sunk on 24 May 1917
- German submarine U-24 (1936), a Type IIB submarine that served in the Second World War until scuttled on 25 August 1944
- German submarine U-24 (S173), a Type 206 submarine of the Bundesmarine that was launched in 1974 and was sold to Colombia after decommissioning on 31 March 2011 where she serves as ARC Indomable.
