= Docter =

Docter may refer to:

- Docter (surname)
- Docter Optics, a German manufacturer of sports optics

== See also ==
- Arthur Docters van Leeuwen, a Dutch politician, jurist and civil servant
- Doctor (disambiguation)
