= Southerly buster =

Southeasterly sea breeze in southeastern Australia

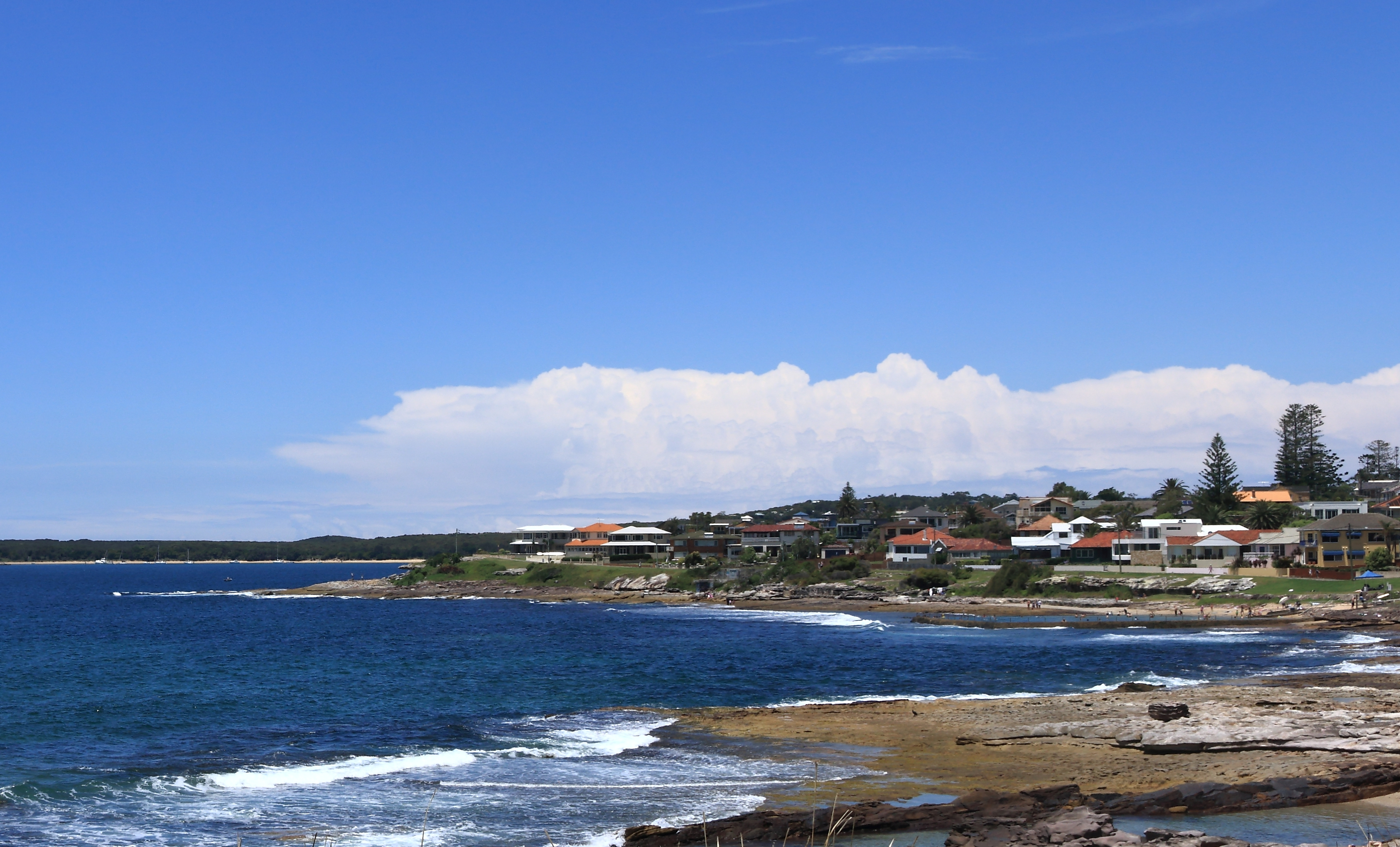
Arrival of a southerly buster in Sydney, over the Royal National Park.

A southerly buster is the colloquial name of an abrupt southerly wind change in the southern regions of New South Wales and Victoria, Australia, which approaches from the southeast, mainly on a hot day, bringing in cool, usually severe weather and a dramatic temperature drop, thus ultimately replacing and relieving the prior hot conditions.

Marking the boundary between hot and cool air masses, a southerly buster is sometimes represented by a roll cloud perpendicular to the coast, which appears from the south and coexists with the wind change, though sometimes there is little visual signal of the southerly's arrival. Southerly busters occur in the backside of a low pressure trough in the Tasman Sea, followed by the speedy advance of an anticyclone south of Western Australia and South Australia (around the Great Australian Bight). They are caused by the interaction of a shallow cold front with the blocking mountain range that aligns the coast, and frictional contrasts over the mainland and the ocean that disconnect the flow.

Southerly busters occur about 32 times each year on the coast of southeastern Australia, with variable strength, usually in spring and summer. Although southerly busters are often associated with NSW and Victoria, they also occur on the east coast of Tasmania, New Zealand, and in Argentina and Chile. The name 'southerly buster' initiated as a slang term used by Sydneysiders, though it has since evolved into an official weather attribute in the Bureau of Meteorology terminology. Global warming has decreased their frequency, with falls of 20 °C (36 °F) in minutes being less recorded, where they can disrupt flights, create dangerous sea conditions, and intensify bushfire danger.

== History ==
=== 19th century ===
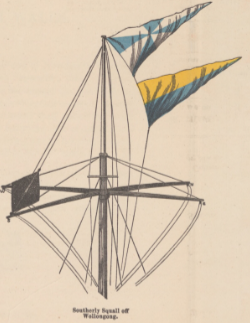
Warning signal showing southerly buster at Wollongong

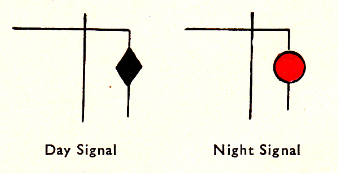
Southerly buster warning signals displayed at Garden Island.

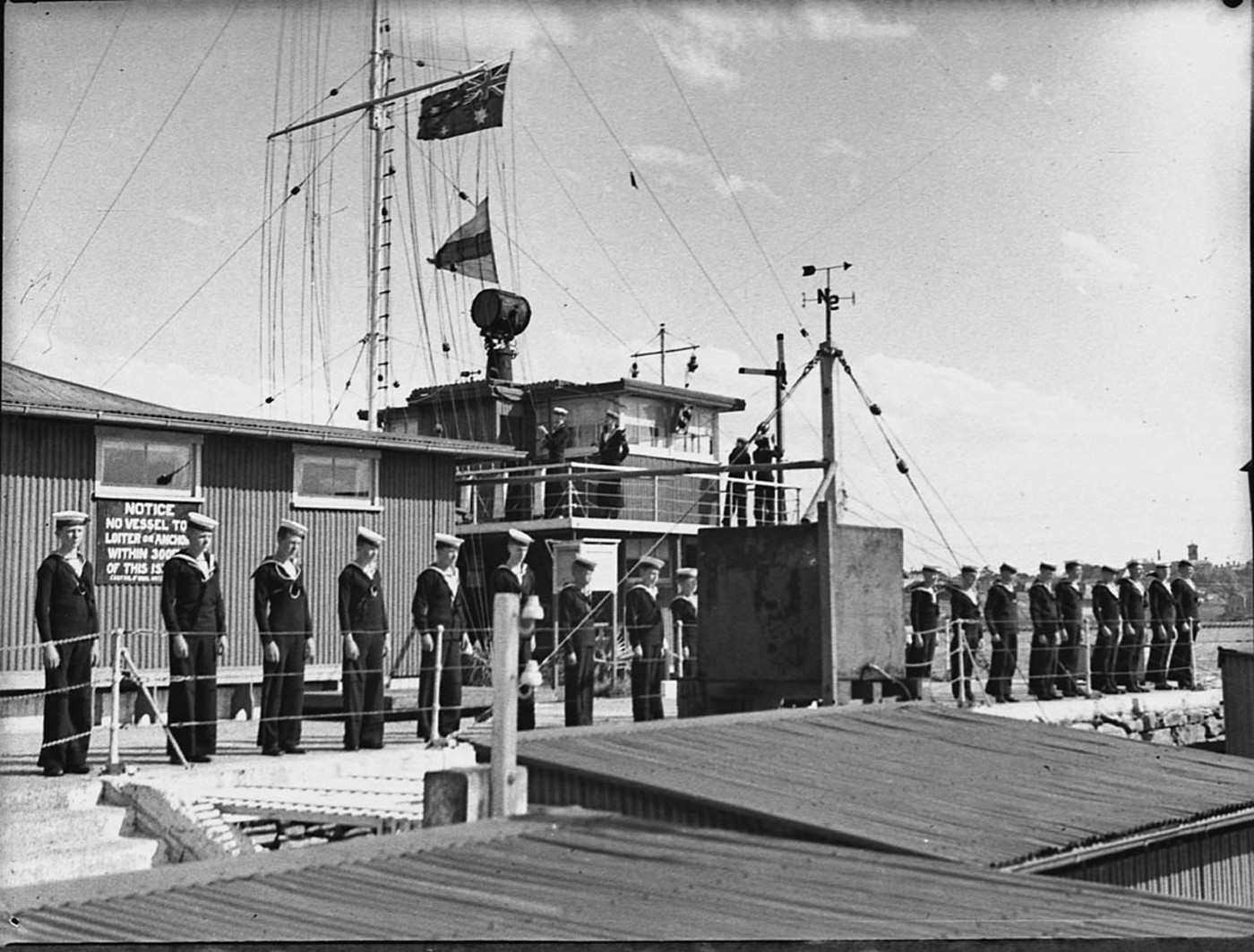
Navy League sea cadets at Schnapper Island with signal staff behind.

In 1819, Australian explorer William Wentworth describes the southerly buster experienced in Sydney:

...They [hot northwesterly winds] seldom, however, continue for more than two days at a time, and are always superseded by a cold southerly gale, generally accompanied with rain. The thermometer then sinks sometimes as low as 60 °F (16 °C), and a variation of temperature of from 30 to 40°F (about 17 to 22°C) takes place in half an hour. These southerly gales usually last at this season from twelve to twenty-four hours, and then give way to the regular sea and land breezes...

From the early days of settlement at Sydney Cove, sudden southerly squalls had been a problem for boats in the harbour. In 1829, a brickfielder as these squalls as were then called, laid the boat carrying Governor Ralph Darling and his family on its beam ends. Later Port Jackson boatmen would call it, the "Sútherly Búster". During the early days of the European settlement, Sydney's summer storms were accompanied by rolling red dust from the colony's brickworks.

In 1869, following the connection of lighthouses and signal stations on the east coast of NSW to the electric telegraph network, a system was instituted to give shipping warning of approaching gales. It would give boats in Port Jackson warning of approaching busters. The new signals were included in Gowland's amendments to the NSW Sailing Directory The signal was a diamond shape (see Day shapes) on the southern yard-arm of the signal mast to indicate a squall approaching from the south, and numeral pendants per John Nicholson's Code of Signals flying on the masthead to show the location of the squall. The numbers were those already in use from 1842 for identifying ports, e.g. Jervis Bay was 46 and Wollongong, added in 1854, was 82. The signal masts were at South Head Signal Station and Fort Phillip. These masts had two yard-arms at right angles aligned north–south and east–west. The success of the system was seen in 1870 when a newspaper reported, "About 9 o'clock, however, intelligence of a southerly burster was telegraphed from Eden, and by half-past 12 the expected 'brickfielder' blew over the city."

From 1876 signals would be displayed at two additional places - the new flagstaff at Bradley's Head and the Floating Light Vessel at the entrance to the harbour. This direction specified that a cone signal on the flagstaff would indicate the approach of a southerly squall. This signal, "A cone, with the point downwards, shows that a gale is probable; at first from the southward.", was introduced in England 1861 by Robert Fitzroy, but this appears to be the first time it was used in Port Jackson. In 1879, George Herbert Gibson published a book called Southerly Busters, where a buster wreaks havoc near Hyde Park, Sydney.

In November 1898, the Postmaster General, Varney Parkes, announced that a white flag with the letters E, J.B. or W would be flown from the flagstaff on the clock tower of the General Post Office, Sydney to signal the approach of a southerly buster. As the wind reached Eden, Jervis Bay or Wollongong the relevant flag would be hoisted. The J.B. flag was hoisted for the first time on 10 February 1899 but the wind did not travel beyond Kiama. The day had been hot and oppressive and the much anticipated cool change did not eventuate. The original intention was to change the flags as the change moved north but this did not always happen. It was possibly later reduced to just two flags, JB and W.

=== 20th century ===
On the night of 16 December 1908 a new signal, also on the GPO clock tower, made its debut. For warnings at night a red light had been installed in the lantern - the glass enclosed room below the flagstaff. It continued until 1940. Capsizes still occurred, but fishing boats did heed the warnings.

In 1931, with the addition of signals for southerly busters, the practice of displaying the Bureau of Meteorology weather forecast with flags was extended, with the cooperation of the Royal Australian Navy, to the signal staff on Garden Island. The weather flags had been flown since 1912 from the flagstaffs on prominent buildings but as well, at Garden Island, a diamond shape would be hoisted for warnings during the day and a red light at night when a southerly buster was expected. In 1932 Navy League sea cadets flew the same signals as at Garden Island at their station on Snapper Island (New South Wales).

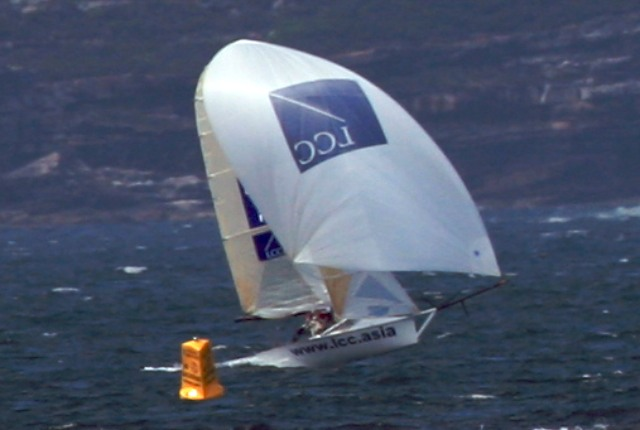
A sailing skiff during an afternoon sea breeze in the Sydney Harbour

The Weather beacon on the top of MLC Building, North Sydney, built in 1957, could also warn of 'southerly busters'. Generally, the forecasts displayed by the lights were updated three times a day but could be changed at anytime if a sudden change was imminent. If a 'buster' was expected the red lights at the bottom of the beacon would flash at half second intervals. This signal, indicating strong winds and rain, was not specific to 'southerly busters', but as the jingle advised:

Flashes short, prepare for gales, Gather the washing, furl the sails."

Author Ruth Park makes a reference to the southerly buster in her novel Poor Man's Orange (1949):

After an unbearably hot day, the old men on the balconies were sniffing the air and saying, 'Here she comes!' The Southerly Buster, the genie of Sydney, flapped its coarse wing over the city ... The women undid the fronts of their frocks and the little children lifted up their shirts and let it blow on their sweaty bottoms.

Analysing statistics from 1970 to 2023 determined that that prior to 1995, southerly busters were predominantly severe and were determined by wind gusts greater than 74 km/h (46 mph). After 1996, the number of less severe busters started to increase, and these milder southerly busters increased significantly between 2017 and 2022 – There was a large increase in weaker southerly busters over the triple La Niña years of 2020 to 2022, which were usually unnoticeable due to their lack of gusts.

== Formation ==
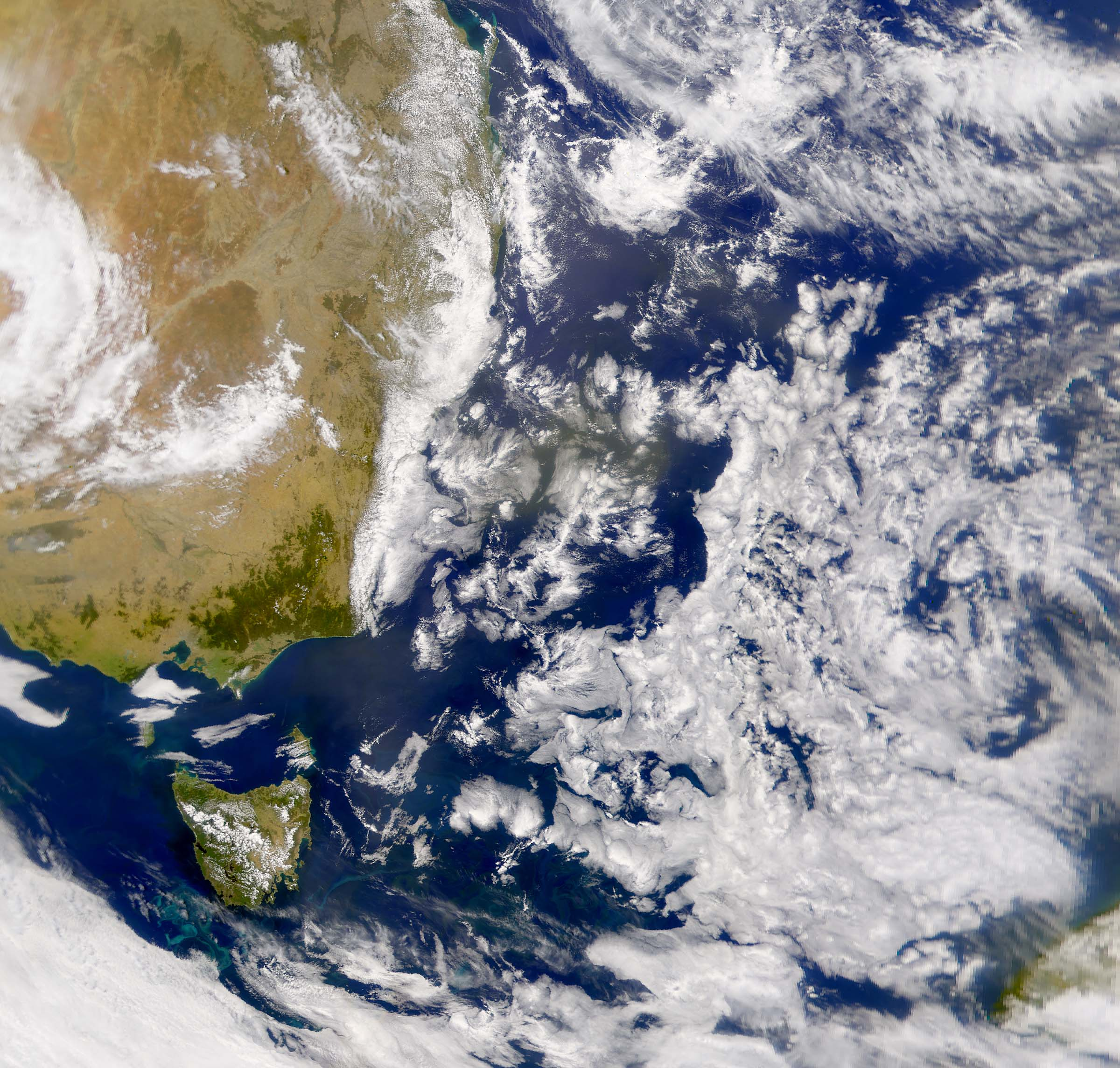
For a southerly buster to occur, a cold front approaching the southeast of Australia should lie between two high pressure systems; one in the Tasman Sea and the other in the Great Australian Bight.

Southerly busters generally develop when a shallow front of cold air arises against the Great Dividing Range. Due to "the orientation of the topography, it slows down over the land because of friction and then it pushes up the coast because it gets trapped", according to Dr Milton Speer, a visiting scholar at the University of Technology Sydney. They mostly form on a hot day, arriving as a strong offshore gale (from the south) that reach the land in the late afternoon, causing a rapid fall in temperature. Sometimes, due to the blocking mountain range paralleling the coast and frictional disparities over land and the ocean which disconnect the flow, a short rain and/or severe thunderstorm activity may accompany, especially if it is affiliated with a cold front coming from the south and a trough.

Other phenomena can lead to amplification of the temperature gradient between the warm air mass and the cold density current, such as hot north-westerlies or a foehn wind that antedate the squall. The southerly buster, which usually trails a thick layer of low stratus clouds bringing episodic drizzle, banks up against the Great Dividing Range, thus resulting in the transmission of the cool maritime air near the southeastern part of the ranges and the blocking of the airflow on the mountains' west side. The Buster progresses into a strongly stable boundary layer with warm, prefrontal landmass air that is between 100 and 200 metres deep transporting over the cooler waters.

In some occasions, a cold front in the Southern Ocean may interact with the Great Dividing Range and develop into a Southerly Buster. It is worth noting that some Southerly Busters are not southern ocean fronts, as they have developed on the pre-frontal trough south of Australia or have possibly originated on the southern NSW coast in affiliation with a shallow mesoscale low development. As the Southerly Buster advances to the north, its force would decrease, though in rare occasions it can fortify north of the Hunter Valley due to upslope motion on the valley's north, which allows the flow to produce anticyclonic vorticity akin to the original obstruction and arrangement of the Southerly Buster in Victoria.

However, the southerly buster does not always create precipitation, aside from light drizzle and light rain, which tend to occur a day after the southerly buster's arrival as its effects may still persist for 24 hours, in addition to creating a weather pattern similar to that of a June Gloom experienced in Southern California. It is proposed that the southerly buster is basically a coastal gravity current that is held against the mountains by the Coriolis force and in transverse geostrophic balance, and is generated when a cold front is obstructed, experiencing anticyclonic distortion near the Great Dividing Range, spreading northward as a coastal trapped orographic jet.

The southerly buster is caused by its interaction with the Great Dividing Range, as the cool air becomes trapped against the ranges, oftentimes in the Gippsland area of Victoria, where the mountains create a channelling effect as the southerly winds move across the New South Wales coast. When the inland portion of the cold front is held against the mountains, the part over the sea proceeds to move along the shore, twisting the front into an 'S' shape. This activity continues on the southern New South Wales coast, while areas leading the front are still experiencing hot northwesterly winds. Other phenomena that lead to the temperature gradient between the warm air mass and the cold density current include; hot north-westerly or warm dry foehn wind that precede the squall. Furthermore, severe thunderstorms may come from the forced elevation of warm, humid air.

=== Characteristics ===
A southerly buster is an intense pre frontal squall occurring in the rear of a low pressure trough and is ahead of a cold front, where it moves northwards from the Southern Ocean and is followed by the swift development of an anticyclone in West Australia. The main distinguishing feature of a southerly buster is the sudden, squally southerly change in wind direction which replace the continental northwesterly winds. This is accompanied by a marked temperature drop and sea level pressure rise. Wind gusts in excess of 40 knots (74 km/h) near ground level averages about three per year, which usually come about after very hot days and would tremendously ease within 30 to 60 minutes after the Buster's arrival, becoming rather light within a few hours. A regular southerly buster is between 20 and 60 nautical miles wide, with the heavier winds concentrated on the seaward strip, with its depth being around 1000m, restricted by the height of the mountains to west.

An orographic jet, the southerly buster is clearly a mesoscale phenomenon, developing on about one day. Because busters seldom keep a staunch speed while advancing along the coast, its arrival has always been difficult to foretell, though meteorologists nowadays have the gain of satellite imagery and weather radar to foresee it, with wind warning issued by the Bureau of Meteorology. Temperature changes can be dramatic, with falls of 10 to 15 °C (18 to 27 °F) often occurring in a few minutes. In extreme conditions, a southerly buster may lower the temperatures from 40 °C (104 °F) to 19 °C (66 °F). To note, some southerly busters can be mild and not very pronounced, where they would arrive on lukewarm days and even during sultry thunderstorm events, bringing in light, though still noticeably cooler winds in the evening, with its effects still remaining in the following few days as well in some cases.

== Regions ==
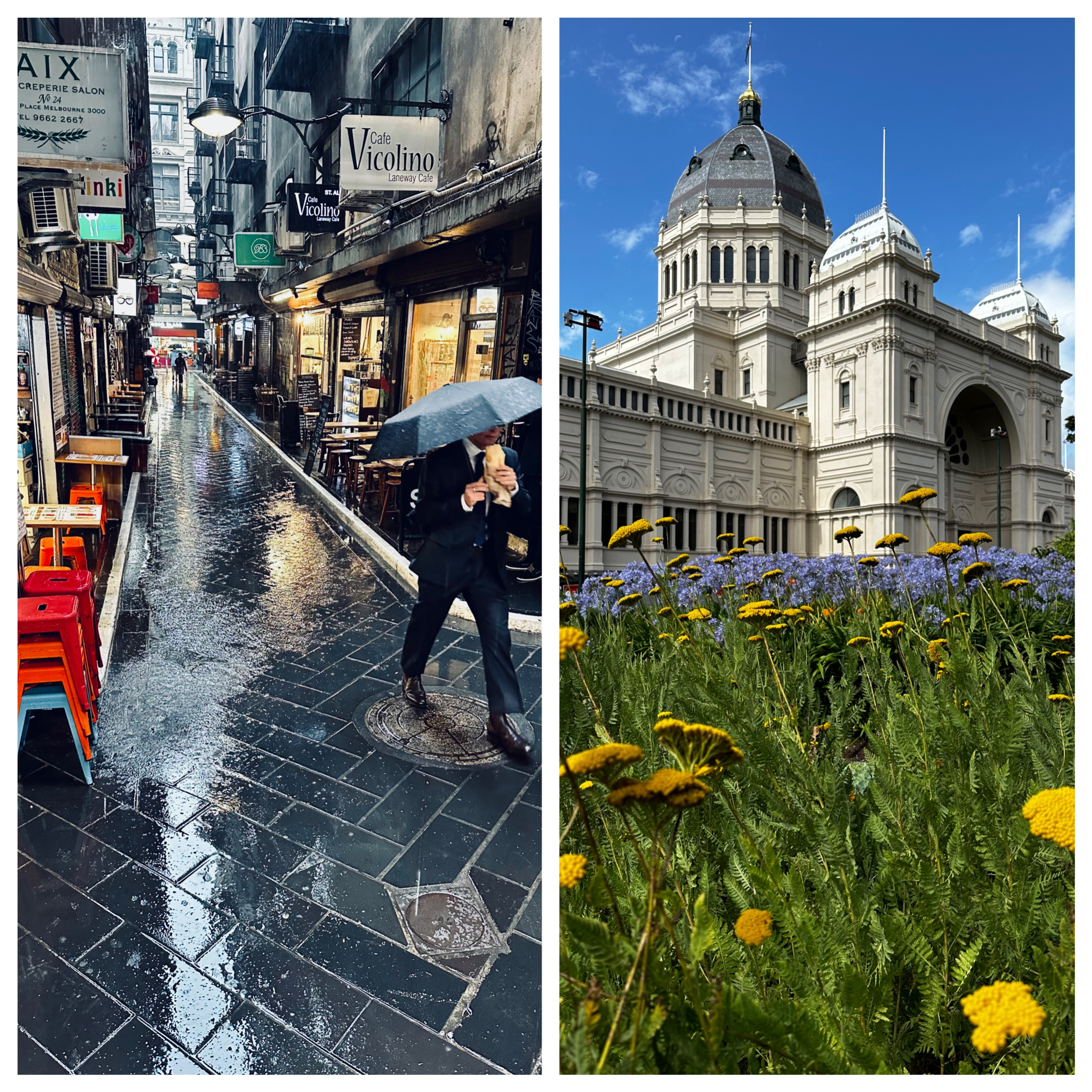
Two photos taken hours apart in Melbourne in January 2024, showing the changeable weather in the city.

- In New South Wales, southerly busters generally reach their maximum intensity between Nowra in the South Coast and Newcastle, rarely passing beyond the Mid North Coast or Port Macquarie – When they do they are usually strengthened by the presence of a tropical cyclone off the north coast of the state. Sydney receives an average of about five Southerly Busters a year, mostly in late spring and early summer, with the stronger ones generally reaching the city in the late afternoon or early evening on a hot day, though at times it would arrive after several days of hot weather. It is a crucial weather feature in the Sydney area, particularly for yachtsmen.
- In Victoria, most notably in Melbourne, southerly busters occur during the afternoons where the domineering heat, brought on by north-westerly winds from central Australia, suddenly gives way to a rapid drop in temperature, followed by rain, thunderstorms and a relatively cool night. They would reach as far inland as Swan Hill in the north and Omeo to the east, but would be less pronounced more inland to the north. Temperature drops in these parts of Victoria are more dramatic than those in the east coast of New South Wales, where a 10°C (18°F) drop in temperature can occur within half an hour (part of the easily changeable weather). Southerly busters mostly emerge in spring, as the landmass northbound of Melbourne starts to warm up. Meanwhile, though, the Southern Ocean, which provides cool breezes to Victoria from the west, does not warm up as swiftly as the mainland. As such, the temperature difference between hot air from the north and cold from the ocean would be very great, thus providing good conditions for the formation of thunderstorms.
- In South Australia, Mount Gambier would the most affected by southerly busters in the state due to its southeasterly location. The buster may also reach Adelaide and Whyalla in some occasions.
- In Western Australia, the Buster occasionally reaches Eucla due to its location near the Southern Ocean in the warm months, where it can experience dramatic temperature drops.
- In Wellington, New Zealand these storms are normally short and frequently have winds gusting between 120 km/h and 160 km/h though higher speeds are known.
- In South America, these southerly fronts frequently encroach on the southern coast of Chile and Argentina and would then advance northwards on both sides of the Andes.

=== Records ===
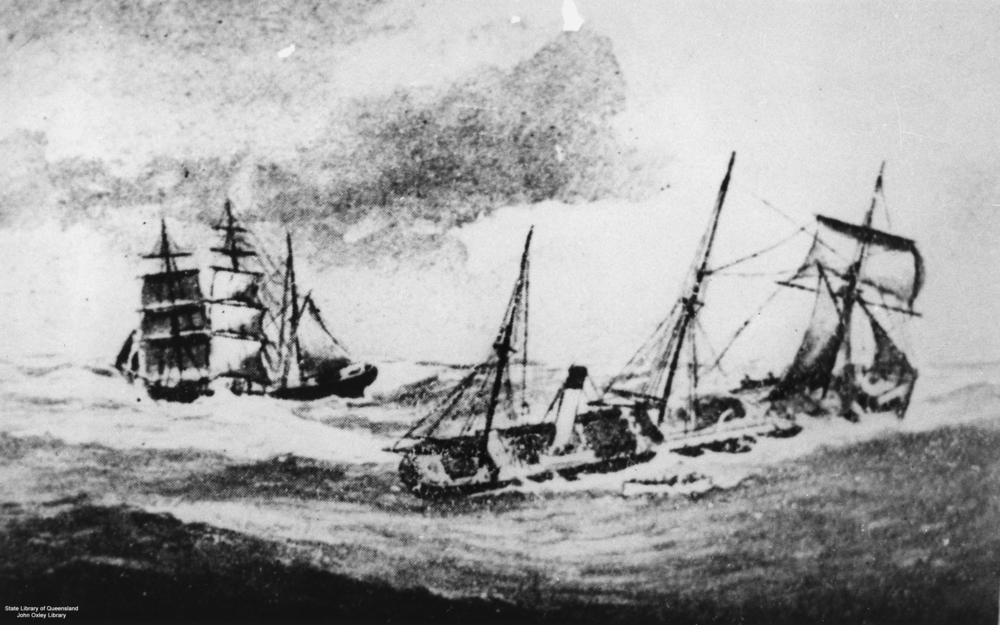
Artist's impression of Dandenong (right) sinking in Jervis Bay in 1876

Henry Ambrose Hunt in "An Essay on Southerly Bursters" included the Dandenong Gale in his list of bursters and wrote "the wind attained, locally, to the abnormal velocity of one hundred and fifty-three miles per hour (246 km/h) in a gust, the rate of one hundred and twelve miles for ten minutes and fifty seven miles per hour for nine hours." The sail-steamer Dandenong foundered off Jervis Bay during the gale with the loss of forty lives. - hence the name of the gale.

This velocity is officially recognised but the Kurnell Tornado in December 2015 shows gusts in excess of 200 km/h (120 mph) are possible in the area, and the day before the tornado the possibility of a southerly buster on the following day had been proposed.

The strongest southerly buster on record at Sydney Airport occurred at 6:40 pm on 18 December 1948 with a maximum wind gust of 113 km/h (70 mph). The second strongest Southerly Buster on record in Sydney reached a maximum gust of 109 km/h (68 mph) at 5:22 pm on 8 January 2003.

== Incidents ==
- On 15 January 2001, a southerly buster with a maximum gust of 100 km/h caused blackouts, property damage and uprooted trees in the Greater Sydney area.
- On 8 January 2003, a southerly buster in Sydney brought thunderstorms with small hail, where 70 suburbs lost power due to the lightning strikes.
- On 21 November 2016, at around 6pm, a powerful southerly change occurred in Melbourne, which resulted in the death of 10 people who were asthmatic and succumbed to respiratory failure. Thousands of others across the city experienced allergic reactions and asthma-like symptoms triggered by the storm. This was due to a stark southerly wind (60 km/hour) that distributed ryegrass pollen into the moist air, rupturing them into very fine specks, small enough particles to enter people's lungs, as they were sucked up into the warm updraft of air forming the storm cells, before they returned to earth in the storm's cool down-draft, spreading across the land in the storm's efflux area. Hospitals and medical centres in the city had to arduously manage 8,500 emergency calls in the space of just five hours, and the hospitalisation of 1,400 people.

== See also ==
- Black nor'easter
- Fremantle Doctor
- Australian east coast low
- Cape Doctor
- Backdoor cold front
