= Small nucleolar RNA Z195/SNORD33 family =

Small nucleolar RNA Z195/SNORD33/SNORD32 family
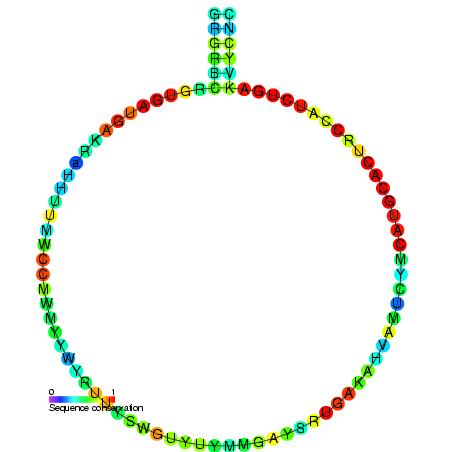
- Predicted secondary structure and sequence conservation of SNORD33

Identifiers
- Symbol: SNORD33
- Alt. Symbols: snoZ195
- Rfam: RF00133

Other data
- RNA type: Gene; snRNA; snoRNA; C/D-box
- Domain: Eukaryota
- GO: GO:0006396 GO:0005730
- SO: SO:0000593
- PDB structures: PDBe

In molecular biology, Small nucleolar RNA Z195/SNORD33 (also known as U33) is a non-coding RNA (ncRNA) molecule which functions in the modification of other small nuclear RNAs (snRNAs). This type of modifying RNA is usually located in the nucleolus of the eukaryotic cell which is a major site of snRNA biogenesis. It is known as a small nucleolar RNA (snoRNA) and also often referred to as a guide RNA.

snoRNA Z195/SNORD33 belongs to the C/D box class of snoRNAs which contain the conserved sequence motifs known as the C box (UGAUGA) and the D box (CUGA). Most of the members of the box C/D family function in directing site-specific 2'-O-methylation of substrate RNAs.

Plant snoRNA Z195 was identified in a screen of Arabidopsis thaliana.

An experiment that looked at 22 different non-small-cell lung cancer tissues found that SNORD33, SNORD66 and SNORD76 were over-expressed relative to matched noncancerous lung tissues.
