= Small nucleolar RNA SNORD66 =

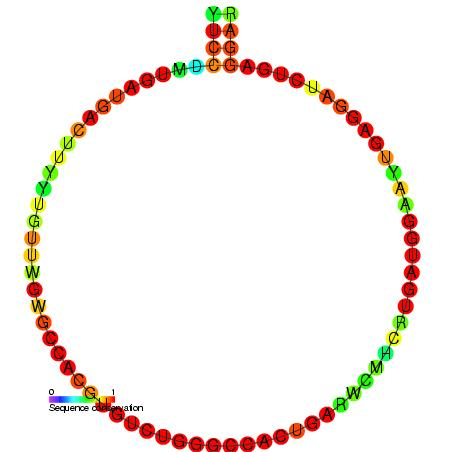
- Predicted secondary structure and sequence conservation of SNORD66

Identifiers
- Symbol: SNORD66
- Alt. Symbols: snoHBII-142
- Rfam: RF00572

Other data
- RNA type: Gene; snRNA; snoRNA; C/D-box
- Domain: Eukaryota
- GO: GO:0006396 GO:0005730
- SO: SO:0000593
- PDB structures: PDBe

In molecular biology, SNORD66 (also known as HBII-142) is a non-coding RNA (ncRNA) molecule which functions in the modification of other small nuclear RNAs (snRNAs). This type of modifying RNA is usually located in the nucleolus of the eukaryotic cell which is a major site of snRNA biogenesis. It is known as a small nucleolar RNA (snoRNA) and also often referred to as a guide RNA.

HBII-142 belongs to the C/D box class of snoRNAs which contain the conserved sequence motifs known as the C box (UGAUGA) and the D box (CUGA). Most of the members of the box C/D family function in directing site-specific 2'-O-methylation of substrate RNAs.

HBII-142 is the human orthologue of the mouse MBII-142 snoRNA and is predicted to guide 2'O-ribose methylation of 18S ribosomal RNA (rRNA) at residue C1272.

An experiment that looked at 22 different non-small-cell lung cancer tissues found that SNORD33, SNORD66 and SNORD76 were over-expressed relative to matched noncancerous lung tissues.
