= Doster =

Doster is a surname. Notable people with the surname include:

- David Doster (born 1970), American baseball player
- Frank Doster (1847–1933), American judge
- Merav Doster (born 1976), Israeli screenwriter
- Reggie Doster (born 1976), American football player

== See also ==
- Docter (surname)
