= Sea breeze =

Wind blowing from sea to land

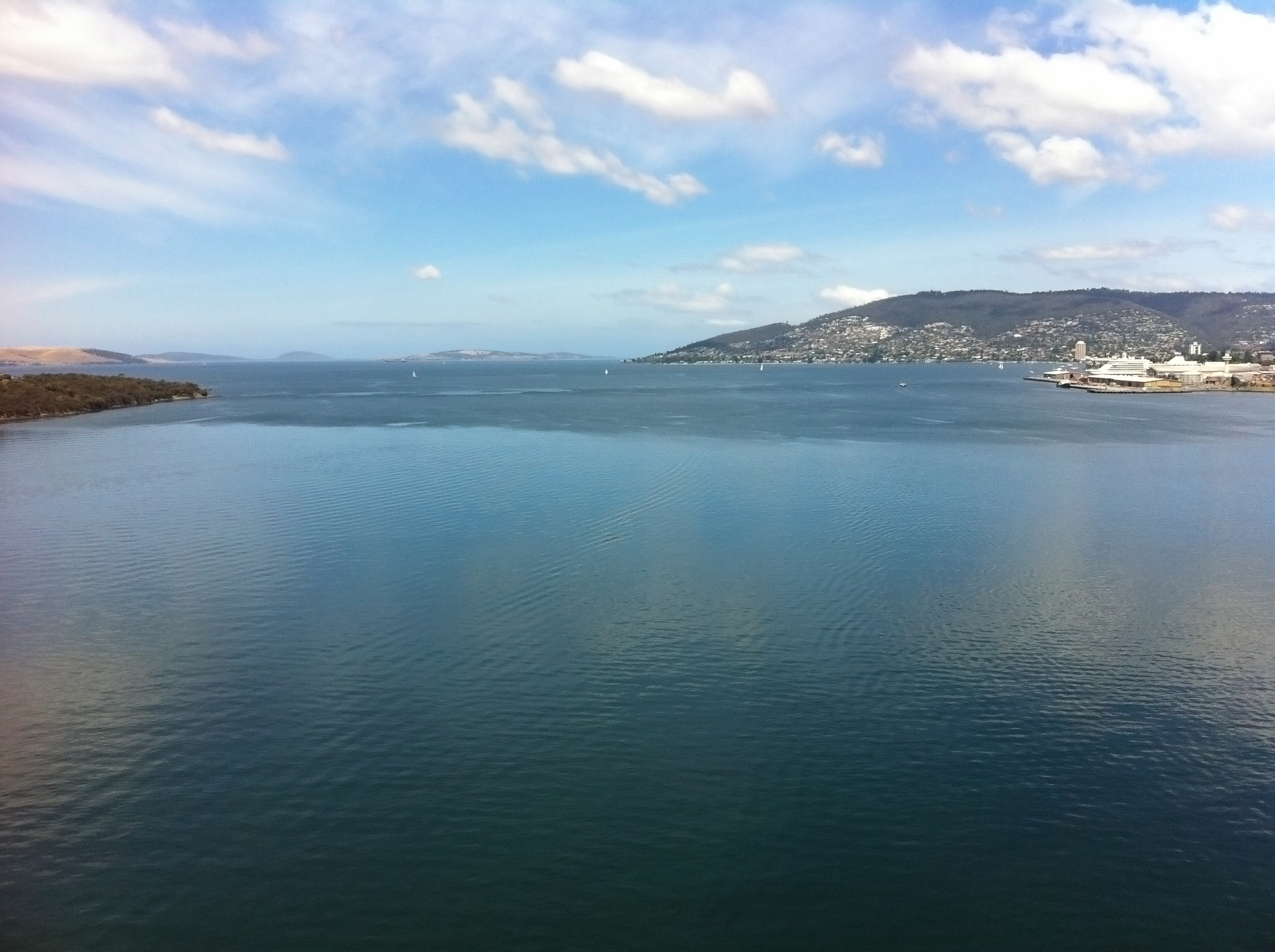
Sea breeze moving across the water (towards the viewer) in Hobart, Tasmania, Australia

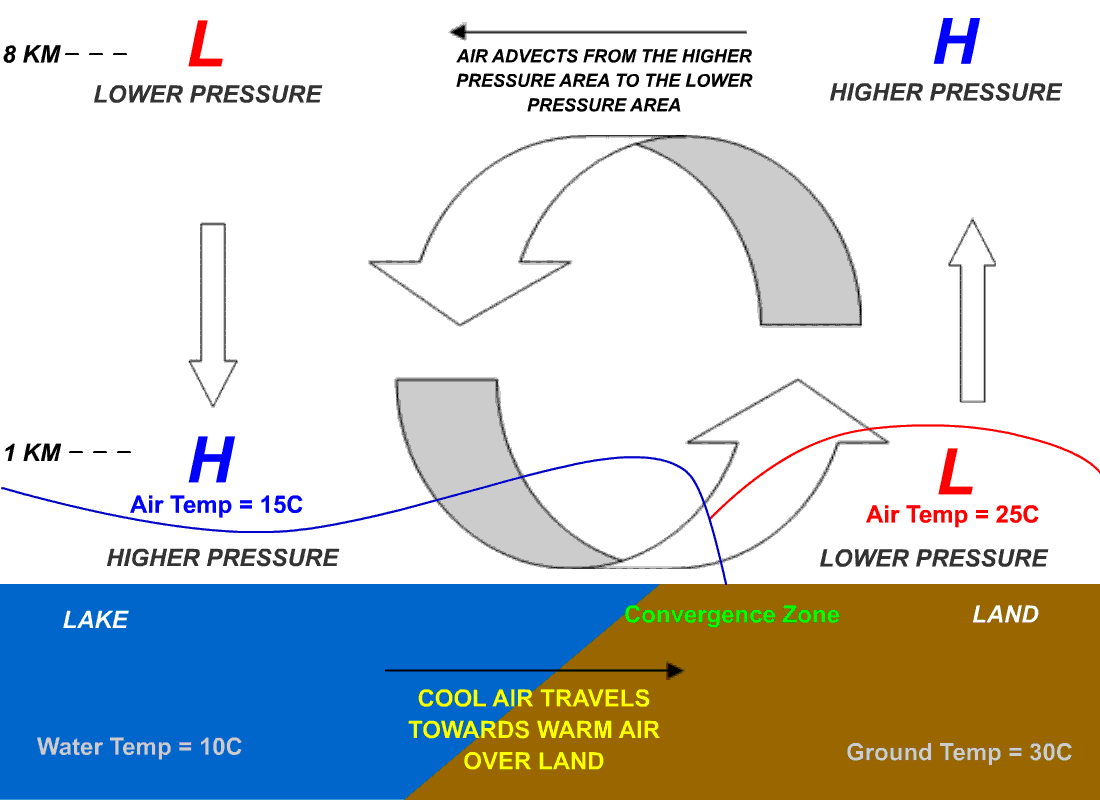
Lake/sea breeze and atmospheric depth

A sea breeze or onshore breeze is a wind that blows in the afternoon from a large body of water toward or onto a landmass. By contrast, a land breeze or offshore breeze is a wind that blows in the night from a landmass toward or onto a large body of water. Sea breezes and land breezes are both important factors in coastal regions' prevailing winds.

Sea breeze and land breeze develop due to differences in air pressure created by the differing heat capacities of water and dry land. As such, sea breezes and land breezes are more localised than prevailing winds. Since land heats up much faster than water under solar radiation, a sea breeze is a common occurrence along coasts after sunrise. On the other hand, dry land also cools faster than water without solar radiation, so the wind instead flows from the land towards the sea when the sea breeze dissipates after sunset.

The land breeze at nighttime is usually shallower than the sea breeze in daytime. Unlike the daytime sea breeze, which is driven by convection, the nighttime land breeze is driven by convergence.

The term offshore wind refers to any wind over open water, which is related to but not synonymous with offshore breeze.

== Causes ==
=== Sea breeze ===
The sea has a greater heat capacity than land, so the surface of the sea warms up more slowly than the surface of the land. As the temperature of the surface of the land rises, the land heats the air above it by convection. The hypsometric equation states that the hydrostatic pressure depends on the temperature. Thus, the hydrostatic pressure over the land decreases less at higher altitude. As the air above the coast has a relatively higher pressure, it starts moving towards the sea at high altitude. This creates an inverse airflow near the ground. The strength of the sea breeze is directly proportional to the temperature difference between the land and the sea. If a strong offshore wind is present (that is, a wind greater than 8 knots (15 km/h; 9 mph)) and opposing the direction of a possible sea breeze, the sea breeze is not likely to develop.

=== Land breeze ===
The land forces the dying of sea breeze so the temperature of the land approaches that of the ocean. If the land becomes cooler than the adjacent sea surface temperature, the air pressure over the water will be lower than that of the land, setting up a land breeze blowing from the land to the sea, as long as the environmental surface wind pattern is not strong enough to oppose it.

Sea breezes typically extend to a vertical depth of 1 to 2 kilometers and a horizontal distance of 10 to 100 kilometers from the coastline, with their strength and spatial reach directly determined by the magnitude of the land-sea temperature difference that is the fundamental cause of their formation.

== Effects ==
=== Sea breeze ===
Schematic cross-section through a sea-breeze front. If the air inland is moist, cumulus often marks the front.

A sea-breeze front is a weather front created by a sea breeze, also known as a convergence zone. The cold air from the sea meets the warmer air from the land and creates a boundary like a shallow cold front. When powerful, this front creates cumulus clouds, and if the air is humid and unstable, the front can sometimes trigger thunderstorms. If the flow aloft is aligned with the direction of the sea breeze, places experiencing the sea breeze frontal passage will have benign, or fair, weather for the remainder of the day. At the front warm air continues to flow upward and cold air continually moves in to replace it, and so the front moves progressively inland. Its speed depends on whether it is assisted or hampered by the prevailing wind, and the strength of the thermal contrast between land and sea. At night, the sea breeze usually changes to a land breeze, due to a reversal of the same mechanisms.

==== Sea breezes in Florida ====
Sea breeze convergence in Cuba is very similar to that in Florida. The northern sea breeze meets the southern sea breeze, creating a sharp convergence line in the cumulus field.

Thunderstorms caused by powerful sea breeze fronts frequently occur in Florida, a peninsula bounded on the east and west by the Atlantic Ocean and Gulf of Mexico, respectively. During the wet season, which typically lasts from June through September/October, any direction that the winds are blowing would always be off the water, thus making Florida the place most often struck by lightning in the United States, and one of the most on Earth. These storms can also produce significant hail due to the tremendous updraft it causes in the atmosphere, especially during times when the upper atmosphere is cooler such as during the spring or fall.

On calm summer afternoons with little prevailing wind, sea breezes from both coasts may collide in the middle, creating especially severe storms down the center of the state. These thunderstorms can drift towards either the west or east coast depending on the relative strengths of the sea breezes, and sometimes survive to move out over the water at night, creating spectacular cloud-to-cloud lightning shows for hours after sunset. Due to its large size, Lake Okeechobee may also contribute to this activity by creating its own lake breeze which collides with the east and west coast sea breezes.

In Cuba, similar sea breeze collisions with the northern and southern coasts sometimes lead to storms.

==== Sea breezes in Southeast Australia ====
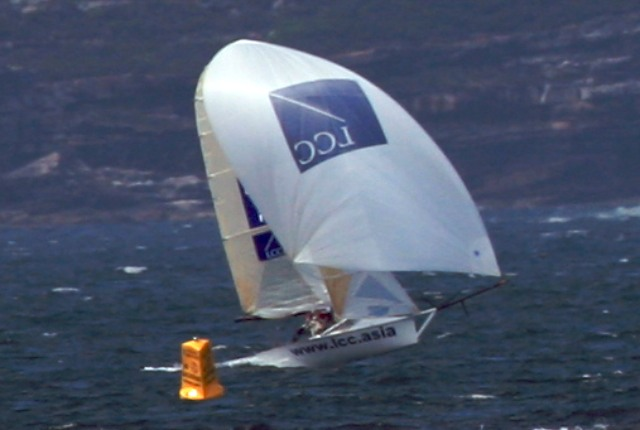
A sailing skiff during an afternoon sea breeze in the Sydney Harbour

In the southeast Australian states of New South Wales and Victoria, an intense sea breeze called the southerly buster causes an abrupt, squally southerly wind change, with gusts in excess of 40 knots (75 km/h; 45 mph), in coastal cities such as Sydney in New South Wales, south to Mallacoota, Victoria and Melbourne, as it approaches from the southeast, mainly on a hot day, bringing in cool, usually severe weather and a dramatic temperature drop, thus ultimately replacing and relieving the prior hot conditions. Marking the boundary between hot and cool air masses, the southerly buster is sometimes represented by a roll cloud perpendicular to the coast.

The southerly buster is caused by the interaction of a shallow cold front with the blocking Great Dividing Range that aligns with the coast, as the cool air becomes trapped against the ranges. The mountains create a channelling effect as the southerly gale winds move across the New South Wales coast, and frictional contrasts over the mainland and the ocean that disconnect the flow. Temperature changes can be dramatic, with falls of 10 to 15 °C (18 to 27 °F) often occurring in a few minutes.

=== Land breeze ===
Land breeze, which consists of cool air coming from the land, pushes the warmer air upwards over the sea. If there is sufficient moisture and instability available, the land breeze can cause showers, or even thunderstorms, over the water. Overnight thunderstorm development offshore due to the land breeze can be a good predictor for the activity on land the following day, as long as there are no expected changes to the weather pattern over the following 12–24 hours. This is mainly because the strength of the land breeze is weaker than the sea breeze. The land breeze will die once the land warms up again the next morning.

== Utilisation ==
Wind farms can be situated near a coast to take advantage of the normal daily fluctuations of wind speed resulting from sea or land breezes. While many onshore and offshore wind farms do not rely on these winds, a nearshore wind farm is a type of offshore wind farm located on shallow coastal waters to take advantage of both sea and land breezes. For practical reasons, other offshore wind farms are situated further out to sea and rely on prevailing winds rather than sea breezes.

== See also ==
- Fremantle Doctor, the local name for the sea breeze in and around Perth, Western Australia
- Southerly buster, a sea breeze, though usually a storm, which is experienced in the southeast coast of New South Wales, southern coast of Victoria and New Zealand
- Mountain breeze and valley breeze – Localized winds which occur in a daily cycle
