= German submarine U-44 =

U-44 may refer to one of the following German submarines:

- SM U-44, was a Type U 43 submarine launched in 1914 and that served in the First World War until sunk on 12 August 1917
  - During the First World War, Germany also had these submarines with similar names:
    - SM UB-44, a Type UB II submarine launched in 1916 and disappeared after 4 August 1916
    - SM UC-44, a Type UC II submarine launched in 1916 and sunk on 4 August 1917
- German submarine U-44 (1939), a Type IX submarine that served in the Second World War until sunk in March 1940
