= Dubodiel =

- Municipality
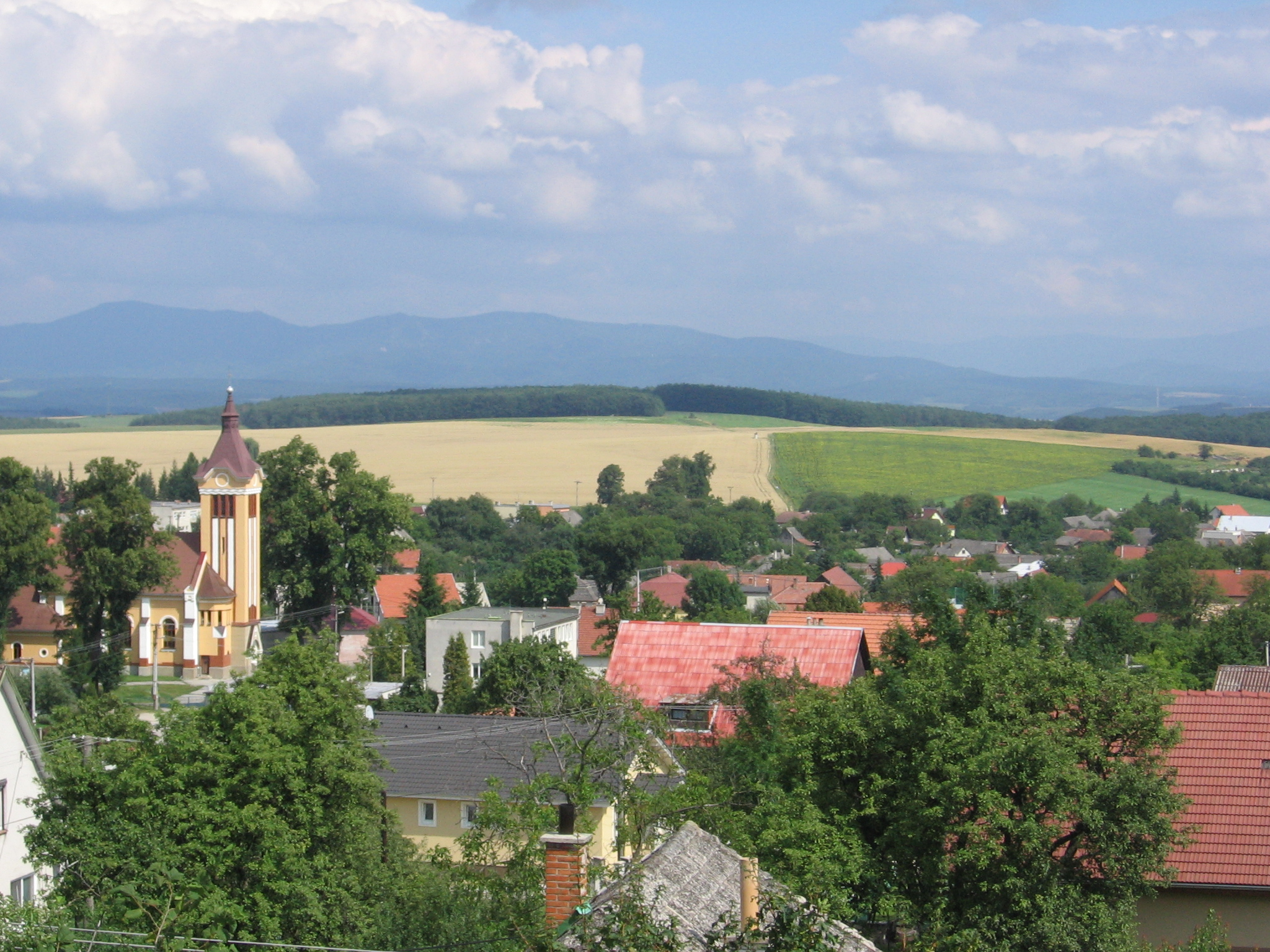

- Flag

- Location of Dubodiel in the Trenčín Region Location of Dubodiel in Slovakia
- Coordinates: 48.77°N 18.10°E
- Country: Slovakia
- Region: Trenčín Region
- District: Trenčín District
- First mentioned: 1439

Area
  - Total: 20.19 km^{2} (7.80 sq mi)
- Elevation: 326 m (1,070 ft)

Population (2025)
  - Total: 1,042
- Time zone: UTC+1 (CET)
  - Summer (DST): UTC+2 (CEST)
- Postal code: 913 23
- Area code: +421 32
- Vehicle registration plate (until 2022): TN
- Website: www.dubodiel.sk

Dubodiel (Hungarian: Trencséntölgyes) is a village and municipality in Trenčín District in the Trenčín Region of north-western Slovakia.

== Names and etymology ==
The name comes from Slovak dub (oak) and diel (a part). Dubodiel - probably an oak forest dividing the landscape into more parts. Dubowy del 1439, Dwbodyel 1493, Dubodiel 1598, Dubodiel 1773.

== History ==
In historical records the village was first mentioned in 1439.

== Geography ==
The municipality lies at an altitude of 326 metres (1,070 ft) and covers an area of 20.19 km^{2} (7.80 sq mi) (2025).

== Population ==
Population statistic (10 years)
Year	1995	2005	2015	2025
Count	902	916	944	1042
Difference		+1.55%	+3.05%	+10.38%

Population statistic
Year	2024	2025
Count	1031	1042
Difference		+1.06%

It has a population of 1042 people (31 December 2025).

=== Ethnicity ===
Census 2021 (1+ %)
Ethnicity	Number	Fraction
Slovak	961	98.97%
Total	971	

In year 2021 was 971 people by ethnicity 961 as Slovak, 7 as Czech, 3 as Not found out, 2 as German, 2 as Other, 1 as Russian and 1 as Croatian.

Note on population: The difference values of population numbers in the table "Population statistic" and in the sections "Ethnicity" & "Religion" is caused by the use of various statistical methods.

=== Religion ===
Census 2021 (1+ %)
Religion	Number	Fraction
Roman Catholic Church	859	88.47%
None	83	8.55%
Evangelical Church	13	1.34%
Total	971	

In year 2021 was 971 people by religion 859 from Roman Catholic Church, 83 from None, 13 from Evangelical Church, 5 from Other, 3 from Christian Congregations in Slovakia, 2 from Ad hoc movements, 1 from Old Catholic Church, 1 from Paganism and natural spirituality, 1 from Other and not ascertained christian church, 1 from Not found out, 1 from Greek Catholic Church and 1 from Apostolic Church.

== Genealogical resources ==
The records for genealogical research are available at the state archive "Statny Archiv in Banska Bystrica, Nitra, Slovakia"

- Roman Catholic church records (births/marriages/deaths): 1782-1896 (parish A)
- Lutheran church records (births/marriages/deaths): 1729-1895 (parish B)

== See also ==
- List of municipalities and towns in Slovakia
