= German submarine U-78 =

U-78 may refer to one of the following German submarines:

- SM U-78, a Type UE I submarine launched in 1916 and that served in World War I until sunk 27 October 1917
  - During World War I, Germany also had these submarines with similar names:
    - SM UB-78, a Type UB III submarine launched in 1917 and sunk on 19 April 1918
    - SM UC-78, a Type UC II submarine launched in 1916 and sunk on 9 May 1918
- German submarine U-78, a Type VIIC submarine that served in World War II until sunk on 16 April 1945
