= DR =

DR, Dr, dr, dR may refer to:

- Doctor (title), an academic title, or medical practitioner

== Arts, entertainment and media ==
- Diário da República, the official gazette of Portugal
- Douay–Rheims Bible, or D–R, a Bible translation
- "Dr." (song), by Namie Amuro, 2009

== Businesses ==
- DR (broadcaster), the Danish Broadcasting Corporation
- DR Automobiles, an Italian automobile company
- DR Handmade Strings, a manufacturer of guitar strings
- Design Research (store), or D/R, a former retail store
- Deutsche Reichsbahn, former German railway company
  - Deutsche Reichsbahn (East Germany), former German railway company
- Digital Research, a defunct American software company
- Duane Reade, an American pharmacy chain
- Ruili Airlines, a Chinese airline, IATA code DR

== Places ==
- Dominican Republic, a Caribbean country
- Dadar railway station, Mumbai, India, Central zone station code DR

== Science and technology ==
- Dead reckoning, a process of estimating global position
- Demand response, a method of managing consumer consumption of electricity
- Design rationale, documentation of reasons behind decisions made during technical design
- Designated Router, in Open Shortest Path First protocol
- Digital radiography, a form of X-ray imaging using digital sensors
- IT disaster recovery, reestablishing systems following a disaster
- Dram (unit) (dr), a unit of mass and volume
- Dynamic range, the ratio between the largest and smallest possible values of a quantity, such as sound and light

== Other uses ==
- Dr, indicating a debit in bookkeeping
- Depositary receipt, negotiable financial instrument
- Lombok, prefixed as DR in the vehicle registration plates of Indonesia

== See also ==
- Doctor (disambiguation)
