= Edward Dostaler =

- Born: 20 September 1988 (age 37); Hinton, Alberta, Canada
- Known for: Solo run across Canada and back
- Website: www.fasteddycanada.com/home.html

Edward Dostaler, also known as Fast Eddy, is a Canadian charity runner who ran solo across Canada and back to raise money for breast cancer and Alzheimer's disease. He was born in Hinton, Alberta and currently resides in Kamloops, British Columbia.

== "Fast Eddy" solo cross Canada and back run ==
Dostaler embarked on his solo 21,585 kilometre "across Canada and back" run on March 1, 2015 in Victoria BC. He ran alone, pushing his supplies in a jogging stroller which he named "Aurora." The money raised for the two causes — breast cancer and Alzheimer's disease — stays in the province that it was raised in.

In August 2015, it was reported that Dostaler was running low on funds and resorted to flying back home.

On September 19, 2015, Dostaler realized that the Marine Atlantic ferry from Sydney, Nova Scotia to Argentia, Newfoundland, which was about 420 km away at the time, would be closing for the winter in five days. Missing this ferry would mean that he would have to extend the run by roughly 911 km. This would also cause him to run through Atlantic Canada during the harsh winter months. He managed to run an average of about 69 km per day for five days to make it to the ferry, arriving just two hours before the last departure. September 20, 2015, Dostaler ran across Confederation Bridge which links the provinces of Prince Edward Island and New Brunswick, becoming the first person to include this bridge as part of a cross Canada run. His run across the bridge was part of Canada's largest Terry Fox Run, commemorating the 35th anniversary of the Marathon of Hope. The story of Terry Fox was one of Dostaler's main inspirations.

== 24 hour runs ==
During his cross Canada and back run, Dostaler stopped in each province to do a 24-hour running event to gain awareness and support. These events took place in Calgary, Alberta on April 18, 2015; in Regina, Saskatchewan on May 9, 2015; and in Winnipeg, Manitoba on May 23, 2015.
