= The Doctor (nickname) =

Doctor or The Doctor is the nickname or stagename for:

- The Doctor (Doctor Who)
- The Doctor (Star Trek) the Emergency Medical Hologram
- Clive Jackson, aka "The Big Doctor", lead singer of Doctor and the Medics
- W. G. Grace (1848–1915), English cricketer
- Doctor Khumalo (born 1967), South African footballer
- Lindsay McDougall (born 1978), Australian radio host
- Valentino Rossi (born 1979), Italian motorcycle racer
- Roland Rotherham, British historian and lecturer
- Julius Erving (born 1950), American basketball player known as "Doctor J"

== See also ==
- Doctor Who
- Doc (nickname)
