= Doctor Voodoo =

Doctor Voodoo may refer to one of the following fictional characters in Marvel Comics.

- Daniel Drumm, the first Doctor Voodoo, who becomes a ghost and supervillain after his death.
- Jericho Drumm, Daniel's twin brother and former Brother Voodoo, who becomes a new Doctor Voodoo on becoming Sorcerer Supreme.
