= Theresa Bailey =

Canadian Hockey Activist

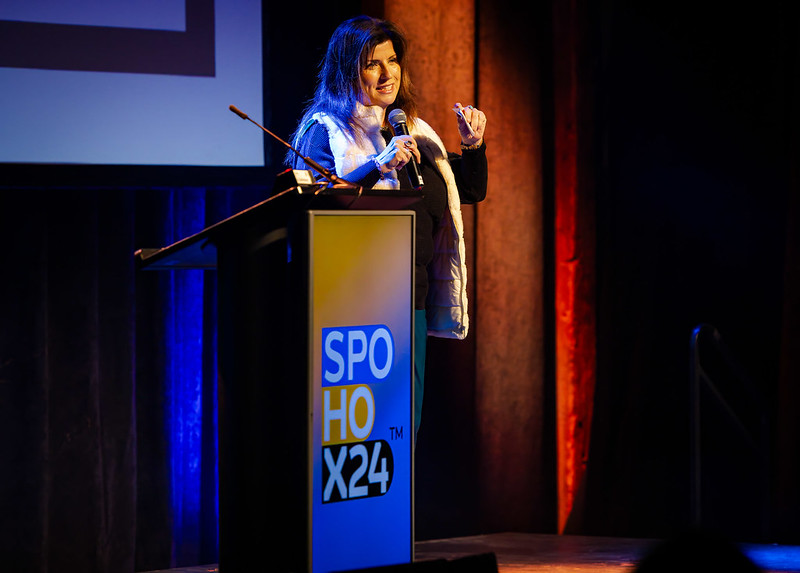
Theresa Bailey, SpoHo Conference Charlottetown (2024)

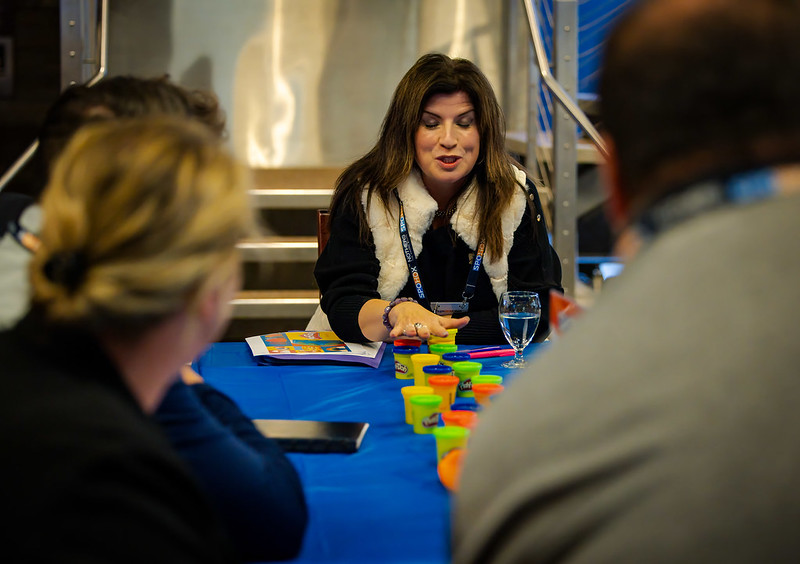
Theresa Bailey facilitating PlayDoh Power Solutions at SpoHo2024 Conference in Charlottetown (2024)

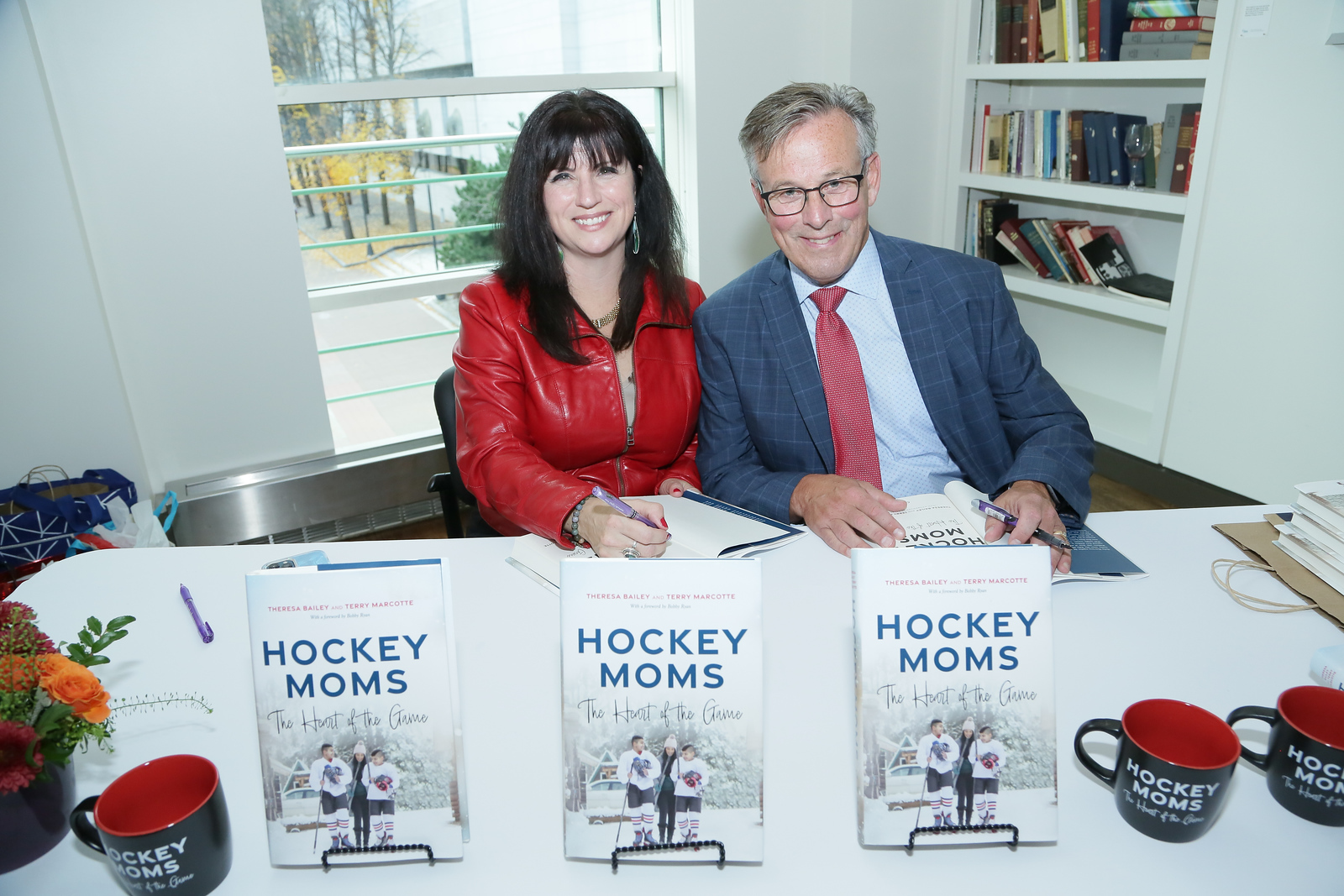
Theresa Bailey and Terry Marcotte at Book Signing, City of Ottawa (2022)

Theresa Bailey is a Canadian hockey advocate, author, and entrepreneur. She is best known for founding the online community Canadian Hockey Moms and for her work in improving hockey culture. She created the CanadianHockeyMoms.ca network in 2010 to support and connect hockey parents and later co-authored the national bestselling book Hockey Moms: The Heart of the Game (HarperCollins, 2022).

Bailey is also the founder of Starfish Synergies Inc, a consulting company.

== Early career and education ==
Bailey holds a master's degree in Community Psychology from Wilfrid Laurier University (2000). Prior to her hockey-related initiatives, she worked in research, evaluation and community development projects in Ontario, often focusing on youth and education. In 2009, she established a consulting practice called Synergy Change Builders, through which she facilitated training programs and strategic planning for organizations. (This venture would later evolve into Starfish Synergies.)

== Founding of Canadian Hockey Moms ==
In early 2010, during the Vancouver Winter Olympics, Bailey launched Canadian Hockey Moms, initially as a personal blog and forum for hockey parents. The idea was sparked by a personal experience: "I started this website when my 7-year-old son had only one shift in an entire game and I didn't know how to deal with it," she said. Frustrated by the lack of resources and community support for new hockey parents, she created the site to share advice, stories, and encouragement. The site originally bore the title Hockey Mom in Canada, but after growing rapidly, it was renamed to CanadianHockeyMoms.ca (following a request from CBC lawyers to avoid confusion with the Hockey Night in Canada brand)

== Advocacy and media involvement ==
Bailey has been an outspoken advocate for improving hockey's culture, focusing on safety, inclusivity, and respect. In a 2015 Globe and Mail article on misbehaving sports parents, she candidly reflected on her own past emotions and urged others to keep perspective.

In 2022, amid national controversy over Hockey Canada's handling of sexual assault allegations, Theresa Bailey emerged as a prominent parent advocate. She spoke to CBC News about the anger and disillusionment among hockey families. "The more that comes out, the more frustrated people are getting," she said, voicing the sentiment of many parents after revelations of a 2018 World Junior team scandal.

== Hockey Moms book and authorship ==
Building on over a decade of community stories, Bailey co-wrote Hockey Moms: The Heart of the Game, published by HarperCollins in October 2022. Co-authored with veteran sportscaster Terry Marcotte, the book is a compilation of more than 30 stories from hockey mothers at all levels of the game. It includes tales from mothers of NHL stars (for example, Connor McDavid's mother, Kelly, contributes) as well as from moms in small-town rinks, weaving a "celebration of the unsung heroes behind the game". Bailey and Marcotte spent years interviewing moms across the country, capturing themes of dedication, sacrifice, humor, and love.

Hockey Moms: The Heart of the Game quickly became a national bestseller in Canada. Readers and reviewers praised the authenticity of the narratives and the heartfelt introduction provided by Bailey, who contextualizes each chapter with her insights. The book was noted for shining a spotlight on women's voices in hockey – an area often dominated by the perspectives of players and coaches.

== Starfish Synergies and Play-Doh Power Solutions ==
In 2020, Theresa rebranded her long-running consulting practice as Starfish Synergies Inc.

Through 2021–2022, Bailey appeared on business podcasts and at entrepreneurship conferences to discuss Play-Doh Power Solutions. On the Quest for New Inspiration podcast, she described the journey of becoming the sole licensee of this program and how it fulfilled her passion for "sharing experiential methods with teams around the world". In an interview on High Growth Founders, she recounted how the COVID-19 pandemic initially devastated her workshop business but also gave her the impetus to pivot to resilience training and secure the Play-Doh partnership. She highlighted that the playful element of the workshops often leads to breakthroughs in communication among team members, reinforcing the idea that "fun doesn't mean unproductive". By 2025, Starfish Synergies had grown its offerings to include a range of creativity-based team-building courses, with Play-Doh at the core.

== Personal life ==
Theresa Bailey lives in Central Ontario with her three children.

== Publications ==
- Aubry, T., Flynn, R.J., Gerber, G., & Dostaler, T. (2005). Identifying the core competencies of support providers working with people with psychiatric disabilities. Psychiatric Rehabilitation Journal, 28(4) pp 346-53.
- Bailey, Nelson, (2003) A Process and Outcome Evaluation of a Shelter for Homeless Young Women. Canadian Journal of Community Mental Health, 22(1).
- Van de Hoef, S. Sundar, P., Austin, S., Dostaler, T. (2011). Global Journal of Community Psychology Practice, 2(2).

== Books ==
- Bailey, T., Marcotte, T. (2022). Hockey Moms: The Heart of the Game. HarperCollins: Toronto.
