= German submarine U-81 =

U-81 may refer to one of the following German submarines:

- SM U-81, a Type U 81 submarine launched in 1916 and that served in the First World War until sunk on 1 May 1917
  - During the First World War, Germany also had this submarine with a similar name:
    - SM UB-81, a Type UB III submarine launched in 1917 and sunk on 2 December 1917
- German submarine U-81 (1941), a Type VIIC submarine that served in the Second World War until sunk on 9 January 1944; raised on 22 April 1944 and broken up
