= DR2 (disambiguation) =

DR2 is a Danish television channel.

DR2 may also refer to:

- Dead Rising 2, a 2010 video game
- Danganronpa 2: Goodbye Despair, a 2012 video game
- DR-2, a highway in the Dominican Republic
- DR2 register, a debug register of x86 processors
- DR2 (car), an Italian automobile by DR Motor Company
- DR P2, a Danish radio station from DR
- Gaia Data Release 2, the second publication of astrometric data
- DR2 (DR for "Dreieckrechner"), a German flight computer manufactured as of 1936
