= U-24 (association) =

Proposed intergovernmental organization

U-24 is an intergovernmental peacekeeping organization proposed by President of Ukraine Volodymyr Zelenskyy aimed at quickly ending armed conflicts between countries. It was first voiced by President Volodymyr Zelenskyy during his speech to the U.S. Congress on 16 March 2022.

== Overview ==
On 16 March 2022, Volodymyr Zelenskyy, President of Ukraine, gave a speech to the U.S. Congress via video conference. Zelenskyy thanked the American people for the support they were providing to Ukraine in context of the 2022 Russian invasion of Ukraine; asked for more diplomatic and military help; and initiated the creation of the intergovernment body or association called U-24. U-24 would stand for United for Peace, while 24 means both 24 hours (1 day) and the 24th of February, the date of the Russian invasion of Ukraine.

The idea is that U-24 should provide all necessary assistance, including armed assistance, within a 24-hour response window.

In addition, such an association "could provide assistance to those who are experiencing natural disasters, man-made disasters, who have become victims of a humanitarian crisis or an epidemic."

== Bilateral security agreements ==
Countries that have signed security agreements with Ukraine: a bilateral agreement, the country is in both NATO and EU bilateral, is in NATO only bilateral, is in EU only no bilateral, but a part of the EU security agreement with Ukraine

In 2024, Ukraine initialized a series of bilateral security agreements. Each agreement is for 10 years, and is intended to strengthen Ukraine's security until it can reach its aim of becoming a member of NATO. The agreements are based on a pledge made by the Group of Seven (G7) in July 2023, which aims to bolster Ukraine's ability to resist Russian aggression.

The following countries have signed the agreements so far:

- NATO members (28 of 32):
  - UK - 12 January 2024
  - France - 16 February 2024 ( (European Union) )
  - Germany - 16 February 2024 ( (European Union) )
  - Denmark - 22 February 2024 ( (European Union) )
  - Canada - 24 February 2024
  - Italy - 24 February 2024 ( (European Union) )
  - Netherlands - 1 March 2024 ( (European Union) )
  - Finland - 3 April 2024 ( (European Union) )
  - Latvia - 11 April 2024 ( (European Union) )
  - Spain - 27 May 2024 ( (European Union) )
  - Belgium - 28 May 2024 ( (European Union) )
  - Portugal - 28 May 2024 ( (European Union) )
  - Iceland - 31 May 2024
  - Norway - 31 May 2024
  - Sweden - 31 May 2024 ( (European Union) )
  - United States - 13 June 2024
  - Estonia - 27 June 2024 ( (European Union) )
  - Lithuania - 27 June 2024 ( (European Union) )
  - Poland - 8 July 2024 ( (European Union) )
  - Luxembourg - 10 July 2024 ( (European Union) )
  - Romania - 11 July 2024 ( (European Union) )
  - Czech Republic - 18 July 2024 ( (European Union) )
  - Slovenia - 18 July 2024 ( (European Union) )
  - Croatia - 9 October 2024 ( (European Union) )
  - Greece - 16 October 2024 ( (European Union) )
  - Albania - 21 January 2025
  - Montenegro - 15 May 2025
  - Bulgaria - 30 March 2026 ( (European Union) )
- Major non-NATO allies (2 of 22):
  - Japan - 13 June 2024
  - Qatar - 28 March 2026
- Non-NATO EU members (1 of 4):
  - Ireland - 4 September 2024 ( (European Union) )
- Supranational unions:
  - European Union - 27 June 2024
- Countries without bilateral security agreement with Ukraine represented by the European Union: Austria, Cyprus, Hungary and Malta.
- Countries seeking bilateral security agreements: Slovakia and South Korea.

== See also ==
- United Nations Department of Peace Operations
- Peace Corps
- Ukraine–NATO relations
