= Doctor Doctor =

Doctor Doctor may refer to:

== Arts, entertainment and media ==
=== Music ===
- "Doctor Doctor", a song by Just Jack from the 2009 album All Night Cinema
- "Doctor Doctor", a 1976 single by Labi Siffre
- "Doctor, Doctor", a song by R5 from the 2015 album Sometime Last Night
- "Doctor, Doctor", a song by The Who from the 1968 album Magic Bus: The Who on Tour
- "Doctor! Doctor!", a 1984 song by Thompson Twins
- "Doctor Doctor" (UFO song), 1974
  - recorded by Iron Maiden, 1996
- Doctor! Doctor! (Zerobaseone song), 2025
- "Bad Case of Loving You (Doctor, Doctor)", a 1978 song by Robert Palmer
- Driving for the Storm / Doctor Doctor, a 2003 EP by Gyroscope

=== Television ===
- Doctor Doctor (American TV series), 1989–1991
- Doctor Doctor (South Korean TV series), 2000
- Doctor Doctor (Australian TV series), 2016–2021
- Doctor, Doctor (talk show), a British show about health and illness, 2005
- "Doctor, Doctor", an episode of Yes, Dear
- "Doctor, Doctor", an episode of The Real Ghostbusters

=== Other uses in arts, entertainment and media ===
- Doctor Doctor, in The Secret Show
- Doctor! Doctor! An Insider's Guide to the Games Doctors Play, a 1986 book by Michael O'Donnell

== Other uses ==
- Dr. Dr., title of a person with a double doctorate
- doctor doctor, informally, a medical doctor, an MD, as opposed to an academic doctor, a PhD

== See also ==
- Doctor (disambiguation)
- Dr. Doctor Willard Bliss, a 19th-century American physician and Civil War veteran
