= Fremantle Doctor =

South westerly sea breeze in Fremantle, Western Australia

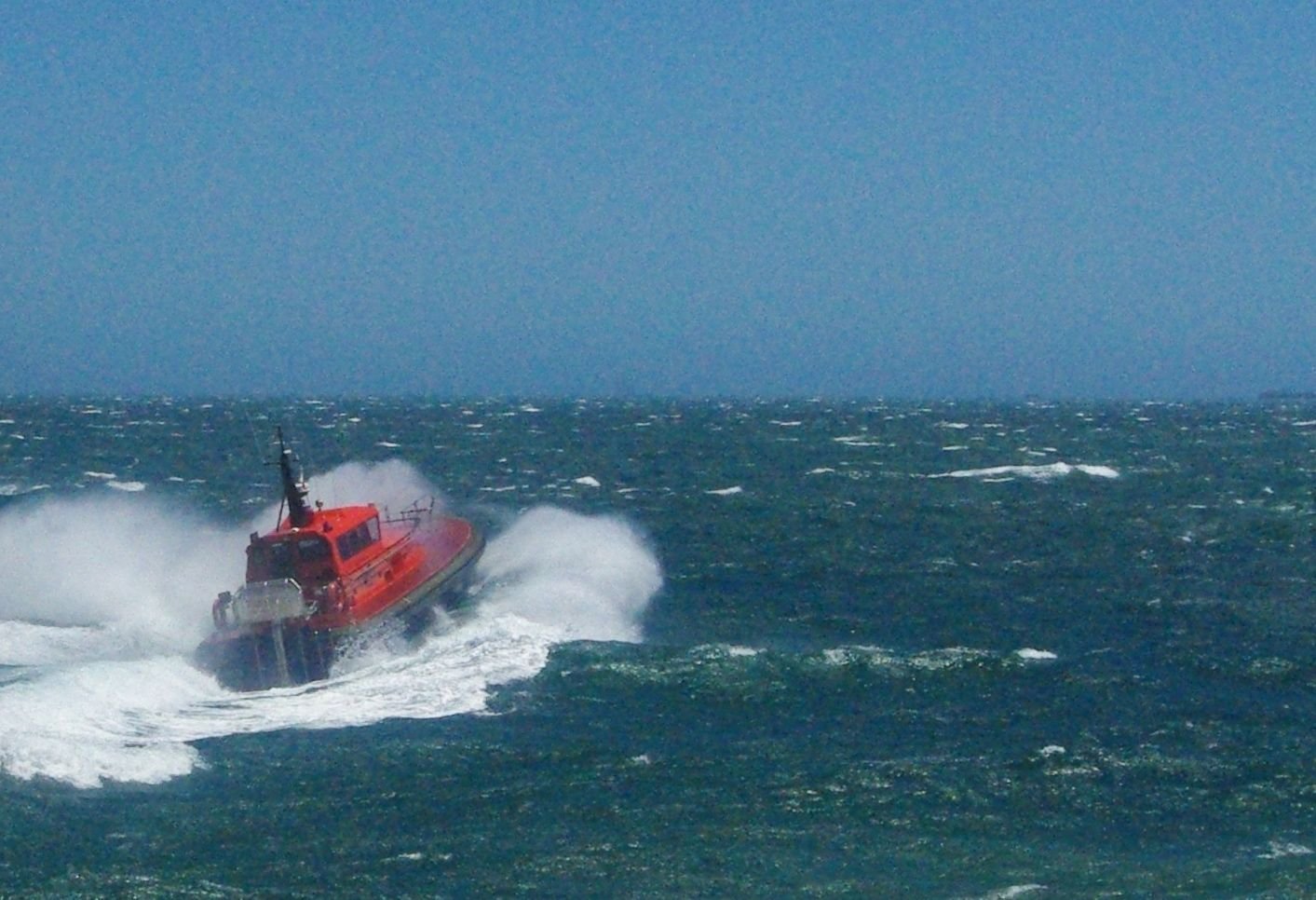
Pilot boat Parmelia facing the Fremantle Doctor at the Fremantle harbour entrance

Fremantle Doctor, the Freo Doctor, or simply The Doctor, is the Western Australian vernacular term for the cooling afternoon sea breeze that occurs during summer months in south west coastal areas of Western Australia. The sea breeze occurs because of the major temperature difference between the land and sea.

In Perth, the capital city of Western Australia, the wind is named Fremantle Doctor because it appears to come from the nearby coastal city of Fremantle, and it brings welcome relief from the summertime high temperatures. The name was in use as early as the 1870s and was similar to equivalent terms for winds that occurred in South Africa and the West Indies.

== General trend ==
During summer months, the Fremantle Doctor consistently blows from the southwest along the southern half of the west coast, starting between 10 am and 3 pm. It can penetrate as far inland as 100 kilometres (60 mi), reaching York in the early evening.

The Fremantle Doctor often cools the Perth suburbs by several degrees, whilst nearer the coast the wind can be quite strong, often blowing between 28 and 37 kilometres per hour (17 and 23 mph).

On days when the wind fails, the afternoon temperatures of Perth suburbs are considerably higher, often exceeding 40 °C (104 °F) in summer, although this is also attributable to the influence of a strong easterly wind blowing in hot desert air from the arid interior of the state.

It was known to have an impact on cricket games being played at the WACA Ground, particularly helping fast and medium swing bowlers by making it hard for a batsman to play at the ball, while also providing a cooling breeze to the players on the field.

== Further analysis ==
The Fremantle Doctor is strongest in December and January, when the temperature differential between the land and ocean is greatest. In February and March the breeze is not as strong, because the ocean is a bit warmer. Though October and November are not as warm, the ocean is cooler, resulting in the sea breeze in these months.

Other months have a weak or non-existent Fremantle Doctor. In the winter months, the land is usually cooler than the ocean, and this sometimes results in the weaker land breeze in the early morning.

When the Fremantle Doctor first arrives, it is from the west-south-west direction. Later, when it is at maximum strength, the direction is usually from the southwest or south-south-west. By the early evening, the direction is from the south. This change in wind direction is due to the Coriolis effect. Other factors, like the prevailing wind of a particular day, can also have an effect on the direction.

A wind rose showing the different wind directions for Perth can be found at the Bureau of Meteorology's website.

== See also ==
- Cape Doctor
- Southerly buster
- Backdoor cold front
