= Phoenix (ATC) =

Air traffic control software

- Developers: DFS - TM/SP; Head of development – Ralf Heidger
- Operating system: Linux
- Type: Air traffic control system
- License: Copyright DFS
- Website: DFS

PHOENIX is a radar data and surveillance data processing system used for many air traffic control applications for the German air traffic control body – Deutsche Flugsicherung (DFS). PHOENIX was also foreseen as a fundamental component for all future air traffic management systems in the DFS into the 2020s and part of the DFS initiative for "ATS componentware" in the European SESAR programme.

== Introduction ==
Since 2001, the DFS has developed its own radar and sensor data processing system, called PHOENIX (a programmatic name instead of an acronym), which is applied in a variety of environments, for a variety of purposes, and with a variety of functional requirements. With PHOENIX the DFS aimed at the level of an advanced ATC system in terms of the previous definitions, not to ATM. To meet these challenges a series of general concepts had been developed and implemented, which are of general interest for the definition and implementation of advanced ATC and C³ systems.

The PHOENIX tracker was originally developed for the surveillance of civilian ATC traffic. It is capable to perform MSDF utilizing very different sensor types regarding accuracy, update rates, as well as their supported attributes. Due to its flexible design it is perfectly suitable for surface movement ground surveillance.

=== Grand context ===
German air traffic of today comprises between 1,000 and 2,000 aircraft tracks at the same time in the national airspace. Besides classical ATC radars also new types of sensors or position information sources like Multilateration, ADS-B, and others are to be integrated. Per day it is required to process up to 10,000 flight plans. In the context of the discussion and development of transnational functional airspaces block like FABEC the required number of maintainable tracks will even grow beyond the 3,000, possibly more than 5,000 simultaneous tracks. An equivalent growth in needed flightplan handling capacity can be reasonably assumed. Each aircraft needs suitable Kalman filtering for tracking to cope both with steady flight and manoeuvre conditions in the different airspaces, and each IFR aircraft needs linkage processing to correlate flightplan data correctly to the track; simple code-callsign-pairing is insufficient due to multiple use of SSR codes.

At the same time the track and flightplan data have to be presented to a number of controller workstations (CWPs), ranging from 1 (low-end applications) or 5 (in towers) to 120 (in ACCs), which results in the demand of an excellent scalability for such a system. Furthermore, CWPs will create much coordination data and additional track-related information which are distributed over the LAN and eventually to external partner systems. To keep the total complex still controllable, system status monitoring and commanding facilities have to be inbuilt. Last but not least such system environments need large sets of configuration and resource data that have to be managed efficiently.

=== Phoenix deployment ===
PHOENIX is a common R/SDPS tool in the German ATC world, used at more than 150 operational locations, scheduled for more than 700 additional locations, and used as a test, analysis, and evaluation tool in more than 200 locations. Today, PHOENIX is an international R/SDPS tool with system recognised internationally.

== Phoenix components ==
=== Server ===
- Multi radar track servers (1MKF, IMMKF, MSDF; d-mrts)
- Track distribution services (d-trksend)
- Configuration and distribution servers (d-dis)
- Recording and replay servers (d-rdr)
- Message servers (d-msg)
- Flightplan and Linkage processing servers (d-fps)
- Persistence Servers (d-pds)
- Information Data Server for direction finders and weather reports (d-ids)
- Radar weather server (d-ws)
- Safety Net Server for STCA, RAI, MSAW, GPM (d-snet)
- Airport Situation Assessment Server for RWY incursions, TWY infringements, etc. (d-asas)
- Online tracking quality control statistics server (d-otqc)
- LANBLF Interface and Proxy
- FATMAC interface and TWRTID Server

=== Client ===
- Controller Working Position (d-cwp)
- Tower Touch Input Approach Display (twrtid)
- Flight Data Workstation (d-fdb)
- Analysis Working Position (d-awp)
- Maintenance Working Position (MWP) with:
  - Adaptation Data Editor (d-adg)
  - Configuration distribution HMI (d-disfront)
  - Map Editor (d-map)
  - System Monitoring (d-mon)

=== Support processes (daemons, interface agents, utilities) ===
- Proxies for PHOENIX middleware (proxy_server)
- Status collector agents (d-agent)
- Application initialisation agents (d-init)
- Interface agents for various flightplan data formats (d-fplIa)
- Bridges for sensor data, flightplan messages (d-sbr,...)
- Interfaces to various printers
- Test data generators (d-gen, d-stca, etc.)
- Video switch controllers

== History ==
- 2001 – Development start, begin of SH/T
- 2002 – Shadow ops in test phase at Leipzig Tower Cluster
- 2003 – Decision for FBS based on PHOENIX. First data fusion with ADS-B
- 2004 – First external customer. PAM experiments with MLAT/WAM
- 2005 – FBS software completed (MWPs, DIS, FDBs). First version of AWP
- 2006 – Rollout for Tower clusters completed
- 2007 – Rollout for ACCs started. MSDF development with SMR started
- 2008 – First SMGCS MSDF version: FIS CWP version, AWP with 3D display
