= Small nucleolar RNA snR60/Z15/Z230/Z193/J17 =

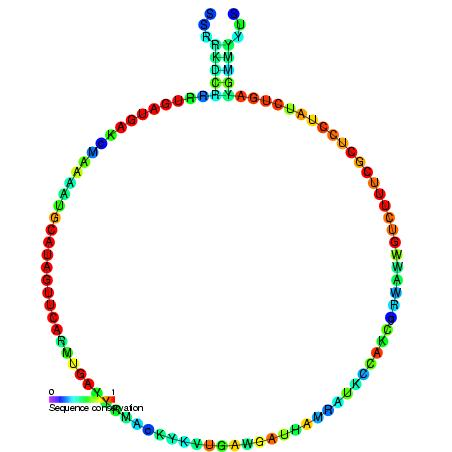
- Predicted secondary structure and sequence conservation of snosnR60_Z15

Identifiers
- Symbol: snosnR60_Z15
- Alt. Symbols: snoZ193
- Rfam: RF00309

Other data
- RNA type: Gene; snRNA; snoRNA; CD-box
- Domain: Eukaryota
- GO: GO:0006396 GO:0005730
- SO: SO:0000593
- PDB structures: PDBe

In molecular biology, snoRNA snR60 is a non-coding RNA (ncRNA) molecule which functions in the modification of other small nuclear RNAs (snRNAs). This type of modifying RNA is usually located in the nucleolus of the eukaryotic cell which is a major site of snRNA biogenesis. It is known as a small nucleolar RNA (snoRNA) and also often referred to as a guide RNA. snoRNA snR60 belongs to the C/D box class of snoRNAs which contain the conserved sequence motifs known as the C box (UGAUGA) and the D box (CUGA). Most of the members of the box C/D family function in directing site-specific 2'-O-methylation of substrate RNAs. snoRNA snR60 was initially discovered using a computational screen of the Saccharomyces cerevisiae genome, subsequent experimental screens discovered plant homologues Z15, Z230, Z193 and J17 and human U80/SNORD80.
