= German submarine U-24 (S173) =

Type 206 submarine of the German Navy

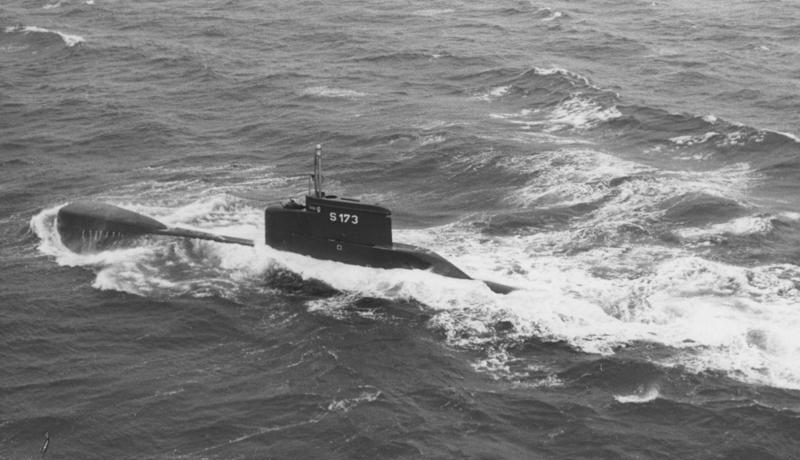
- U-24 of the German Navy

History

Germany
- Name: U-24
- Ordered: 7 June 1969
- Builder: Nordseewerke, Emden
- Laid down: 20 March 1972
- Launched: 26 June 1973
- Commissioned: 16 October 1974
- Decommissioned: 31 March 2011
- Home port: Eckernförde
- Identification: S173
- Fate: Sold to Colombian Navy, 2015

Colombia
- Name: Indomable
- Acquired: 2015
- Commissioned: 5 December 2015
- Status: In active service

General characteristics
- Class & type: Type 206 submarine
- Displacement: 450 t (440 long tons) surfaced; 498 tonnes (490 long tons) submerged
- Length: 48.60 m (159 ft 5 in)
- Beam: 4.60 m (15 ft 1 in)
- Draft: 4.30 m (14 ft 1 in)
- Propulsion: 2 × MTU 12V 493 AZ80 diesel engines, 440 kW (590 hp) each; 1 × Siemens electric motor, 1,100 kW (1,500 hp); 1 × shaft; 5-bladed propeller (7-bladed after modernization)
- Speed: 10 knots (19 km/h; 12 mph) surfaced; 17 knots (31 km/h; 20 mph) submerged
- Range: 4,500 nautical miles (8,300 km) at 5 knots (9.3 km/h; 5.8 mph) surfaced; 280 nautical miles (520 km) at 5 knots (9.3 km/h; 5.8 mph) submerged
- Test depth: 100 metres (330 ft)
- Complement: 22
- Sensors & processing systems: STN Atlas DBQS-21 sonar system (active and passive)
- Armament: 8 × 533 mm (21.0 in) torpedo tubes (bow); DM2A3 Seehecht torpedoes; 24 mines in external containers

U-24 (S173) is a Type 206 submarine formerly in service with the German Navy. Built by Nordseewerke at Emden, she was commissioned in 1974 and served with the West German Navy and later the unified German Navy until 2011. In 2015, she was sold to the Colombian Navy where she serves as ARC Indomable.

== Construction and commissioning ==
U-24 was ordered on 7 June 1969 as part of the Type 206 submarine program. She was laid down at Nordseewerke in Emden on 20 March 1972 and launched on 26 June 1973. The submarine was commissioned into the Bundesmarine on 16 October 1974.

== Service history ==
=== German Navy ===
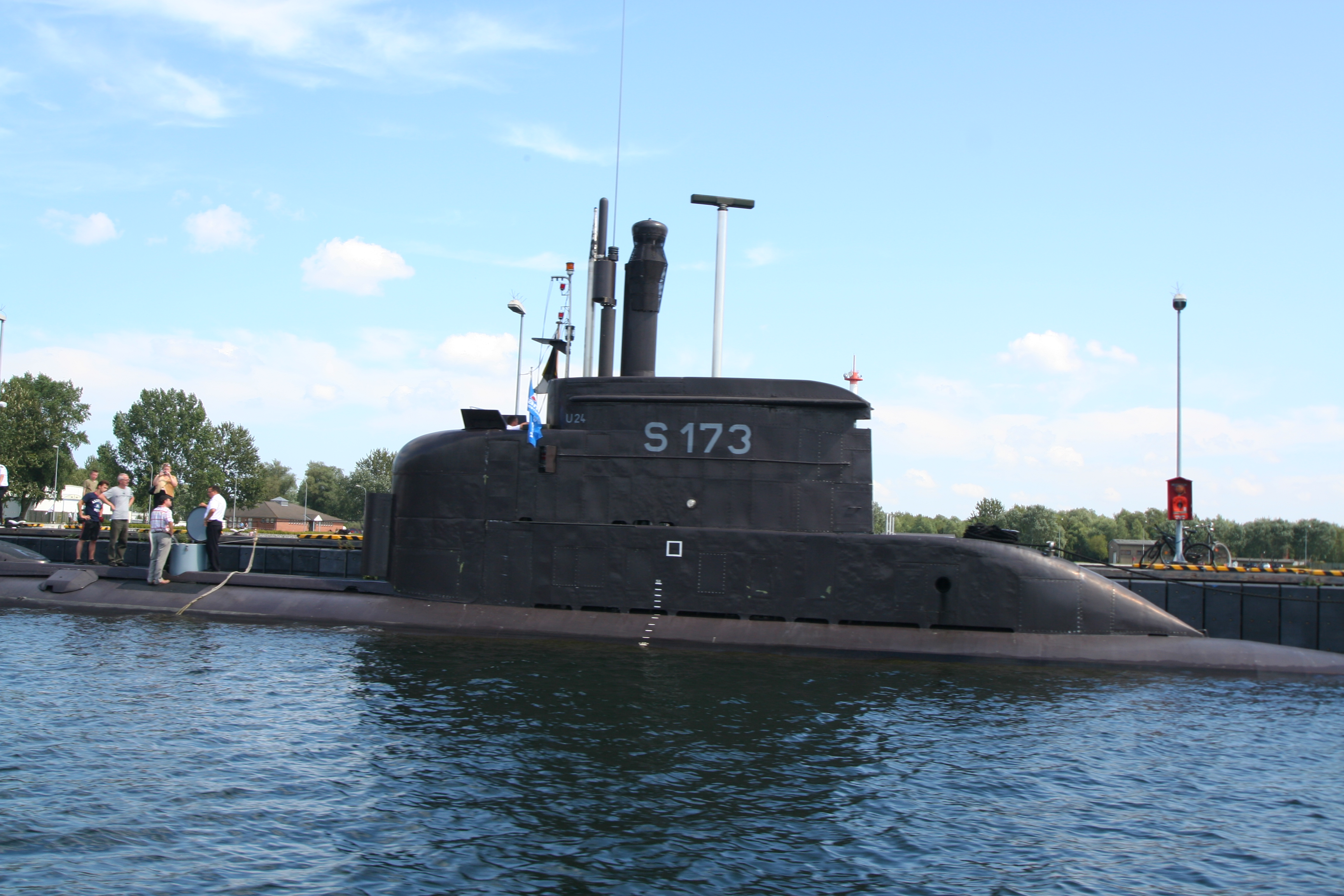
U-24 in harbor during Hanse Sail 2009 in Rostock-Warnemünde

U-24 served with the 3rd Submarine Squadron (3. Ubootgeschwader), based in Eckernförde. Starting in mid-1987, the submarine underwent modernization to the Type 206A standard, with work completed in February 1992. This modernization included:

- Installation of the STN Atlas DBQS-21D sonar system
- New periscopes and optics
- New LEWA weapon control system
- Replacement of the ESM system
- Installation of GPS navigation
- New DM2A3 Seehecht torpedoes
- Seven-bladed propeller replacing the original five-bladed propeller
- Improvements to crew accommodations

The submarine gained international attention during the NATO exercise JTFEX 01-2 in March 2001 in the Caribbean Sea. During the exercise, U-24 successfully penetrated the defensive screen of the U.S. nuclear aircraft carrier USS Enterprise, simulated a torpedo attack on the carrier, photographed it through the attack periscope, and then surfaced alongside the vessel while firing green flares to signal "torpedo fired." This demonstration highlighted the effectiveness of small, quiet diesel-electric submarines against even the most sophisticated surface combatants.

U-24 was decommissioned from the German Navy on 31 March 2011 after 37 years of service.

=== Colombian Navy ===
In 2012, the German Federal Ministry of Defence agreed to sell U-24 and her sister boat U-23 to Colombia. From March 2013 to November 2015, ThyssenKrupp Marine Systems performed extensive modernization work at Kiel, including "tropicalization" modifications for Caribbean operations, upgraded cooling systems, new electronics, and weapons systems. The total investment was €110 million.

U-24 was commissioned into the Colombian Navy as ARC Indomable on 5 December 2015, in a ceremony attended by Colombian President Juan Manuel Santos at Base Naval ARC Bolívar in Cartagena. During the ceremony, President Santos personally decorated German Navy Vice Admiral Andreas Krause and emphasized the strategic importance of the submarines for Colombia's maritime security.

The submarine is employed in anti-drug trafficking operations and the protection of offshore oil fields in Colombian waters.

== See also ==
- List of Type 206 submarines
- List of submarines of the German Navy
- List of submarines of Colombia
