= El Doctor =

Coordinates: 20°49′26″N 99°38′33″W

El Doctor is a series of mountain peaks north of the Pachuca Range of the Sierra Madre Oriental in the states of Querétaro and Hidalgo, Mexico. It includes an escarpment formed by the El Doctor Platform which is a thick series of Cretaceous carbonate formations, including the El Doctor Formation. The peaks rise above 3100 meters.

In 1557, the Spanish discovered silver deposits in the El Doctor mountains.
