= Small nucleolar RNA SNORD24 =

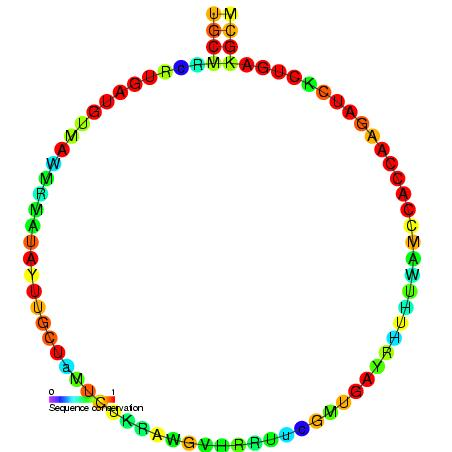
- Predicted secondary structure and sequence conservation of SNORD24

Identifiers
- Symbol: SNORD24
- Alt. Symbols: U24
- Rfam: RF00069

Other data
- RNA type: Gene; snRNA; snoRNA; C/D-box
- Domain: Eukaryota
- GO: GO:0006396 GO:0005730
- SO: SO:0000593
- PDB structures: PDBe

In molecular biology, U24 is a member of the C/D class of snoRNA which contain the C (UGAUGA) and D (CUGA) box motifs. C/D box snoRNAs have been shown to act as methylation guides for a number of RNA targets. U24 is encoded within an intron of the gene for ribosomal protein L7a in mammals, chicken and Fugu. The U76/SNORD76 snoRNA is found in an intron of the uRNA host gene (UHG) growth arrest specific 5 (GAS5) transcript gene. snoRNAs Z20 and U76 snoRNAs show clear similarity to U24.

An experiment that looked at 22 different non-small-cell lung cancer tissues found that SNORD33, SNORD66 and SNORD76 were over-expressed relative to matched noncancerous lung tissues.
