= Docter (surname) =

Docter is a surname. Notable people with the surname include:

- Pete Docter (born 1968), American film director, animator, screenwriter, and producer
- Mary Docter (born 1961), American speed skater
- Sarah Docter (born 1964), American speed skater
- Tijn Docter (born 1972), Dutch actor
