= Small nucleolar RNA SNORD79 =

RNA molecule

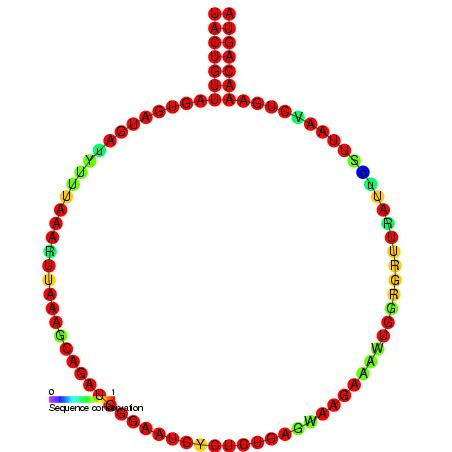
- Predicted secondary structure and sequence conservation of SNORD79

Identifiers
- Symbol: SNORD79
- Alt. Symbols: U79
- Rfam: RF00152

Other data
- RNA type: Gene; snRNA; snoRNA; C/D-box
- Domain: Eukaryota
- GO: GO:0006396 GO:0005730
- SO: SO:0000593
- PDB structures: PDBe

In molecular biology, snoRNA U79 (also known as SNORD79 or Z22) is a non-coding RNA (ncRNA) molecule which functions in the modification of other small nuclear RNAs (snRNAs). This type of modifying RNA is usually located in the nucleolus of the eukaryotic cell which is a major site of snRNA biogenesis. It is known as a small nucleolar RNA (snoRNA) and also often referred to as a guide RNA.

U79 belongs to the C/D box class of snoRNAs which contain the conserved sequence motifs known as the C box (UGAUGA) and the D box (CUGA). Most of the members of the box C/D family function in directing site-specific 2'-O-methylation of substrate RNAs.

snoRNA U79 is found in intron 7 of the GAS5 gene in humans and is also present in mice. U79 is predicted to guide the 2'O-ribose methylation of 28S ribosomal RNA (rRNA) residue A3809.
