= Small nucleolar RNA SNORD47 =

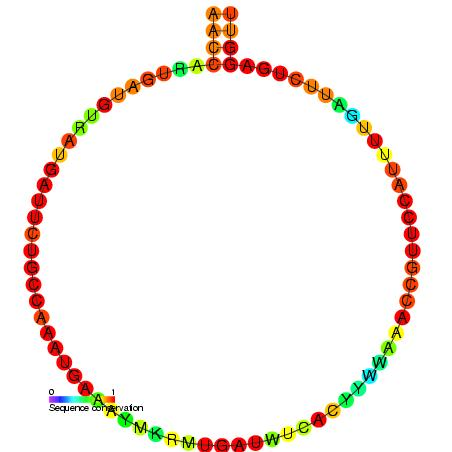
- Predicted secondary structure and sequence conservation of SNORD47

Identifiers
- Symbol: SNORD47
- Alt. Symbols: U47
- Rfam: RF00281

Other data
- RNA type: Gene; snRNA; snoRNA; C/D-box
- Domain: Eukaryota
- GO: GO:0006396 GO:0005730
- SO: SO:0000593
- PDB structures: PDBe

In molecular biology, SNORD47 (also known as U47) is a non-coding RNA (ncRNA) molecule which functions in the modification of other small nuclear RNAs (snRNAs). This type of modifying RNA is usually located in the nucleolus of the eukaryotic cell which is a major site of snRNA biogenesis. It is known as a small nucleolar RNA (snoRNA) and also often referred to as a guide RNA.

snoRNA U57 belongs to the C/D box class of snoRNAs which contain the conserved sequence motifs known as the C box (UGAUGA) and the D box (CUGA). Most of the members of the box C/D family function in directing site-specific 2'-O-methylation of substrate RNAs.

This snoRNA was originally cloned from HeLa cells and expression verified by northern blotting. It is predicted to guide 2'O-ribose methylation of ribosomal RNA (rRNA) 28S at residue C3866. The mouse orthologue was also cloned

This snoRNA is encoded in the introns of the same genes as other C/D box snoRNAs U44, U74, U75, U76, U77, U78, U79, U80 and U81.
