= Small nucleolar RNA SNORD44 =

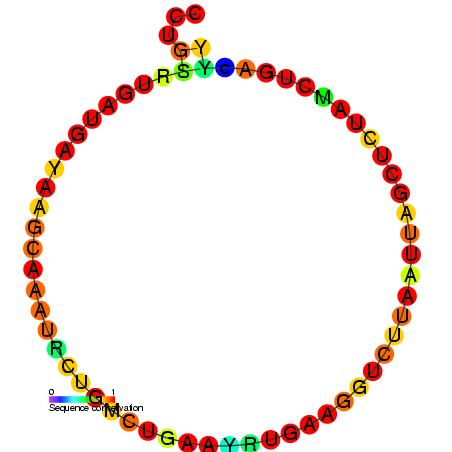
- Predicted secondary structure and sequence conservation of SNORD44

Identifiers
- Symbol: SNORD44
- Alt. Symbols: U44
- Rfam: RF00287

Other data
- RNA type: Gene; snRNA; snoRNA; C/D-box
- Domain: Eukaryota
- GO: GO:0006396 GO:0005730
- SO: SO:0000593
- PDB structures: PDBe

In molecular biology, snoRNA U44 (also known as SNORD44) is a non-coding RNA (ncRNA) molecule which functions in the modification of other small nuclear RNAs (snRNAs). This type of modifying RNA is usually located in the nucleolus of the eukaryotic cell which is a major site of snRNA biogenesis. It is known as a small nucleolar RNA (snoRNA) and also often referred to as a guide RNA.

snoRNA U44 belongs to the C/D box class of snoRNAs which contain the conserved sequence motifs known as the C box (UGAUGA) and the D box (CUGA). Most of the members of the box C/D family function in directing site-specific 2'-O-methylation of substrate RNAs.

U44 was originally cloned from HeLa cells and expression verified by northern blotting. It is predicted to guide 2'O-ribose methylation of 18S ribosomal RNA(rRNA) at residue A166. In the human genome, U44 is located in the same gene as several other C/D box snoRNAs (U47, U74, U75, U76, U77, U78, U79, U80 and U81).
