= Small nucleolar RNA SNORD81 =

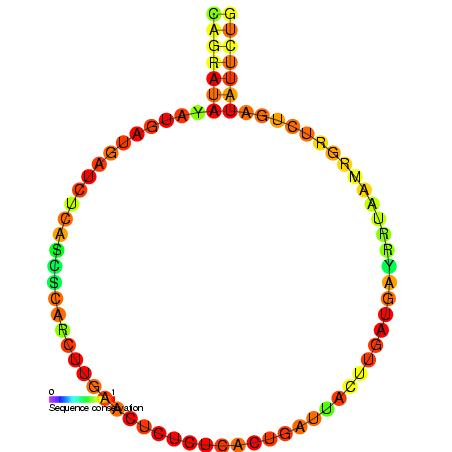
- Predicted secondary structure and sequence conservation of SNORD81

Identifiers
- Symbol: SNORD81
- Alt. Symbols: U81
- Rfam: RF00136

Other data
- RNA type: Gene; snRNA; snoRNA; CD-box
- Domain: Eukaryota
- GO: GO:0006396 GO:0005730
- SO: SO:0000593
- PDB structures: PDBe

In molecular biology, U81 (also sometimes called Z23 snoRNA) is a member of the C/D class of snoRNA which contain the C (UGAUGA) and D (CUGA) box motifs. U81 acts as a guanine methylation guide and is found in intron 11 of the gas5 gene in mammals.
