= Glen Esk =

Glen Esk or Glenesk may refer to:

- Glen Esk, Queensland, a locality in the Somerset Region, Queensland, Australia
- Glenesk, a suburb in Johannesburg, South Africa
- Glenesk Folk Museum, a museum in Angus, Scotland
- Glenesk railway station, a railway station in Midlothian, Scotland
- Glen Esk, along the River North Esk, one of the Five Glens of Angus, Scotland
- Glen Esk, a historic building at Towson University in Maryland, US (razed by the university in 2021)
- Glen Esk Valley in New Zealand, home to Glen Esk Road, stream, and dam. Also written as Glenesk and near Piha Beach and the Kitekite Falls
