= Towson University buildings and structures =

These are the former and current buildings and structures of Towson University and its predecessor institutions.

== Former locations ==
These buildings are located in Baltimore, Maryland. The School/College/University was housed in them at separate periods before the institution moved to its current suburban location, north of the City of Baltimore in north-central Baltimore County in the county seat of Towson, Maryland in September 1915.

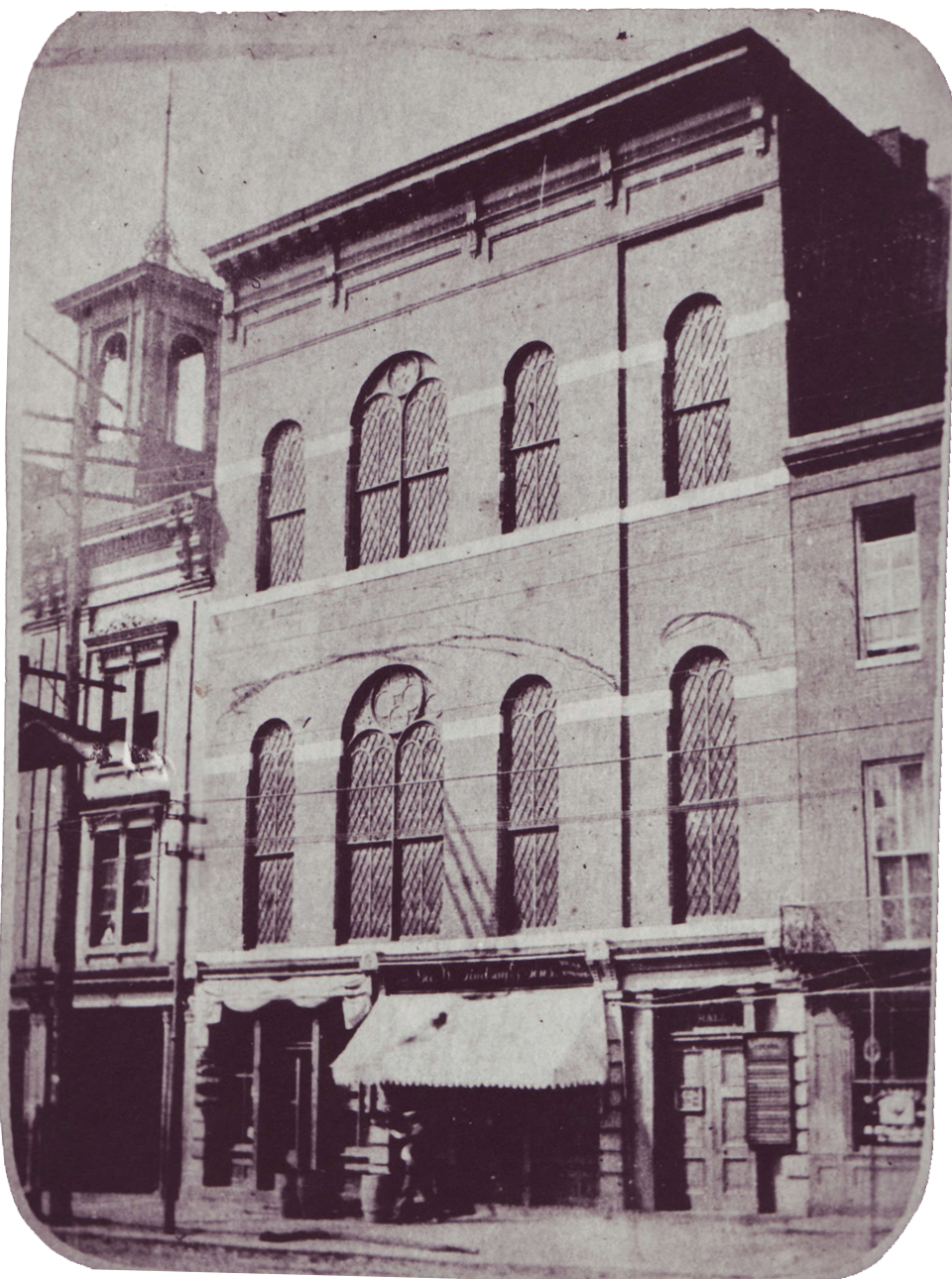
"Red Men's Hall", North Paca Street
1866

William Howard Mansion/Union Club/Athenaeum Club
1872

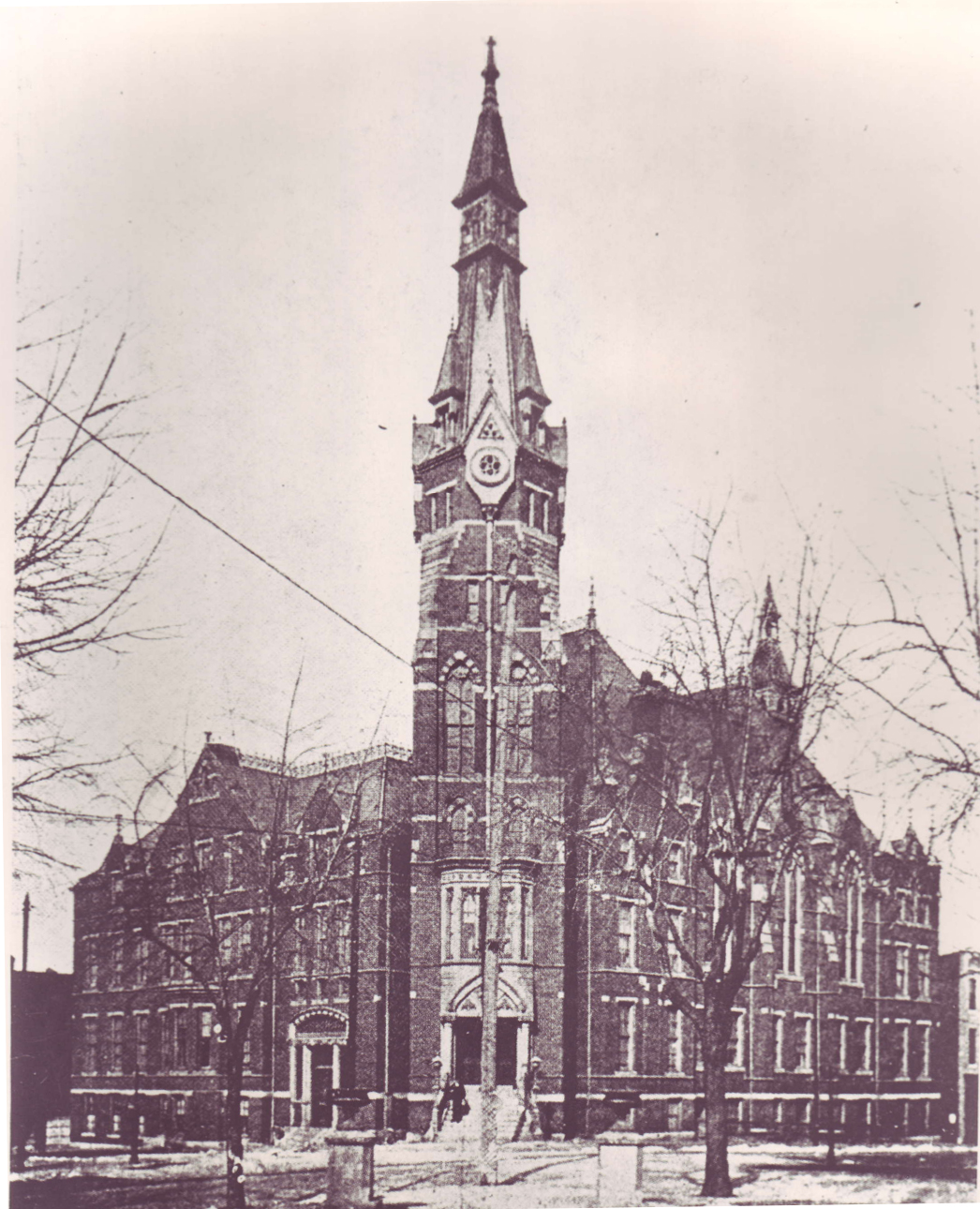
Lafayette Square - Carrollton and Lafayette Avenues
1875

== Academic and administrative ==
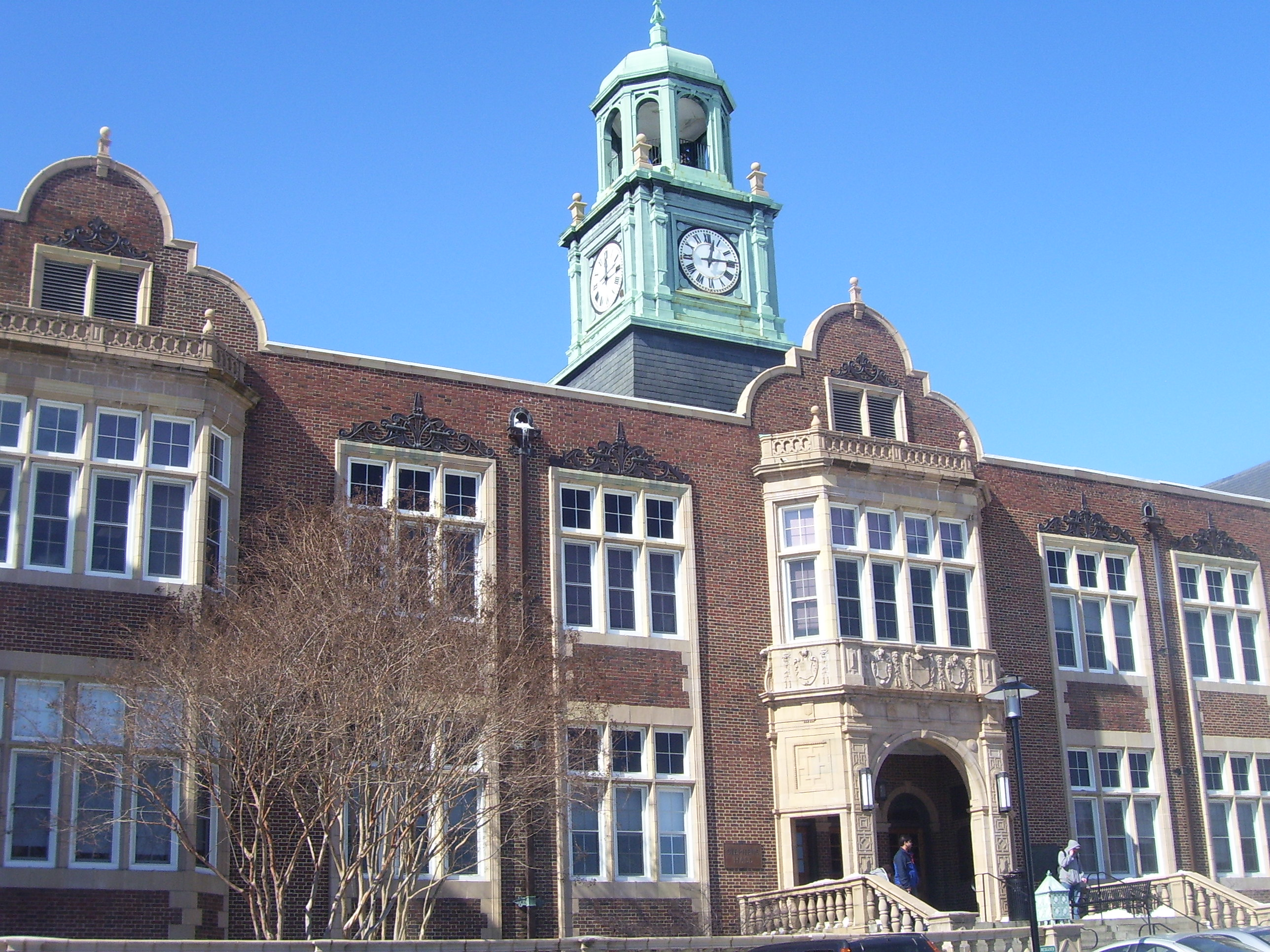
Stephens Hall
1915
College of Business and Economics

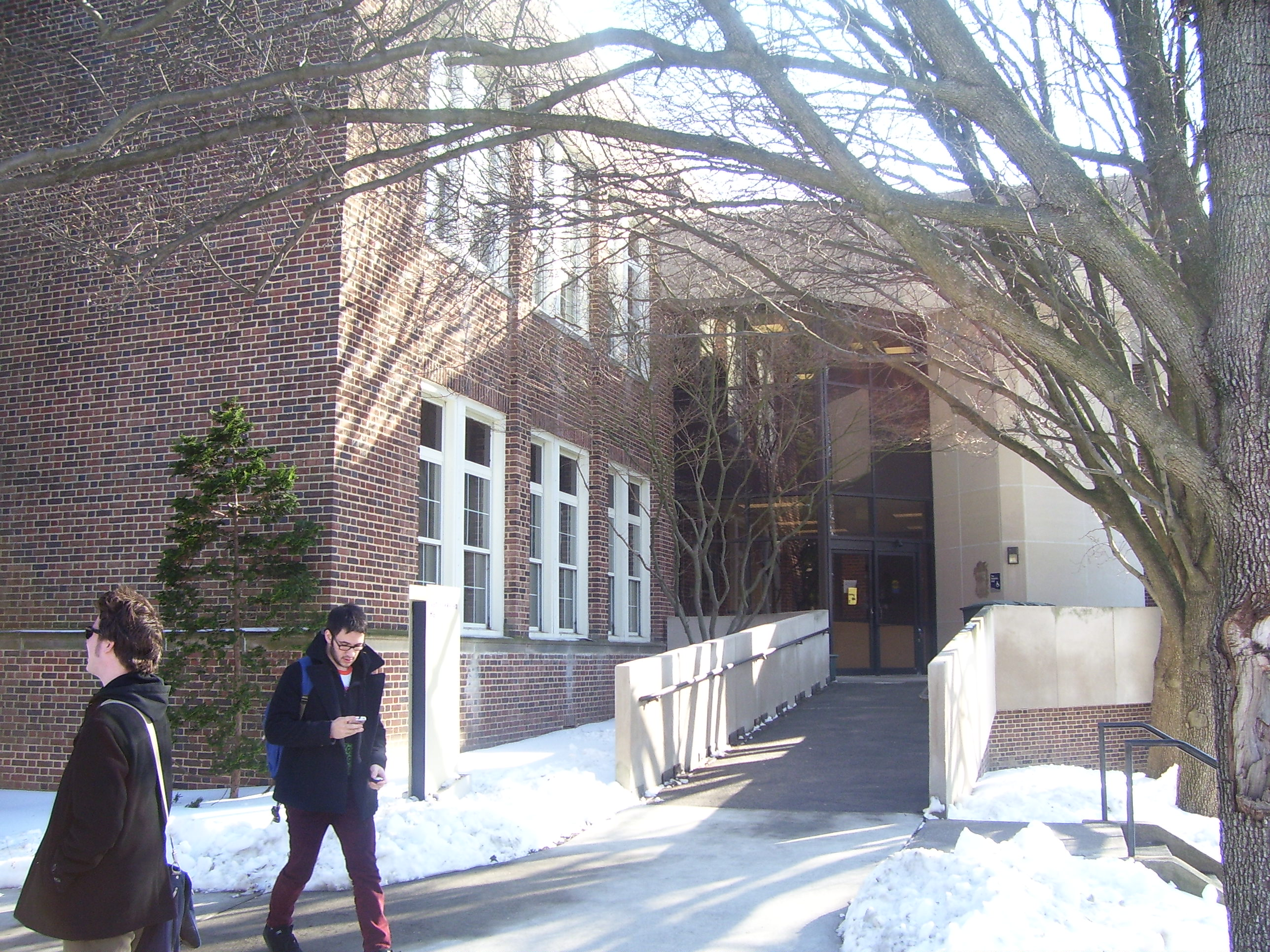
Van Bokkelen Hall
1924
Mass Communication and Communication Studies
Communication Sciences and Disorders

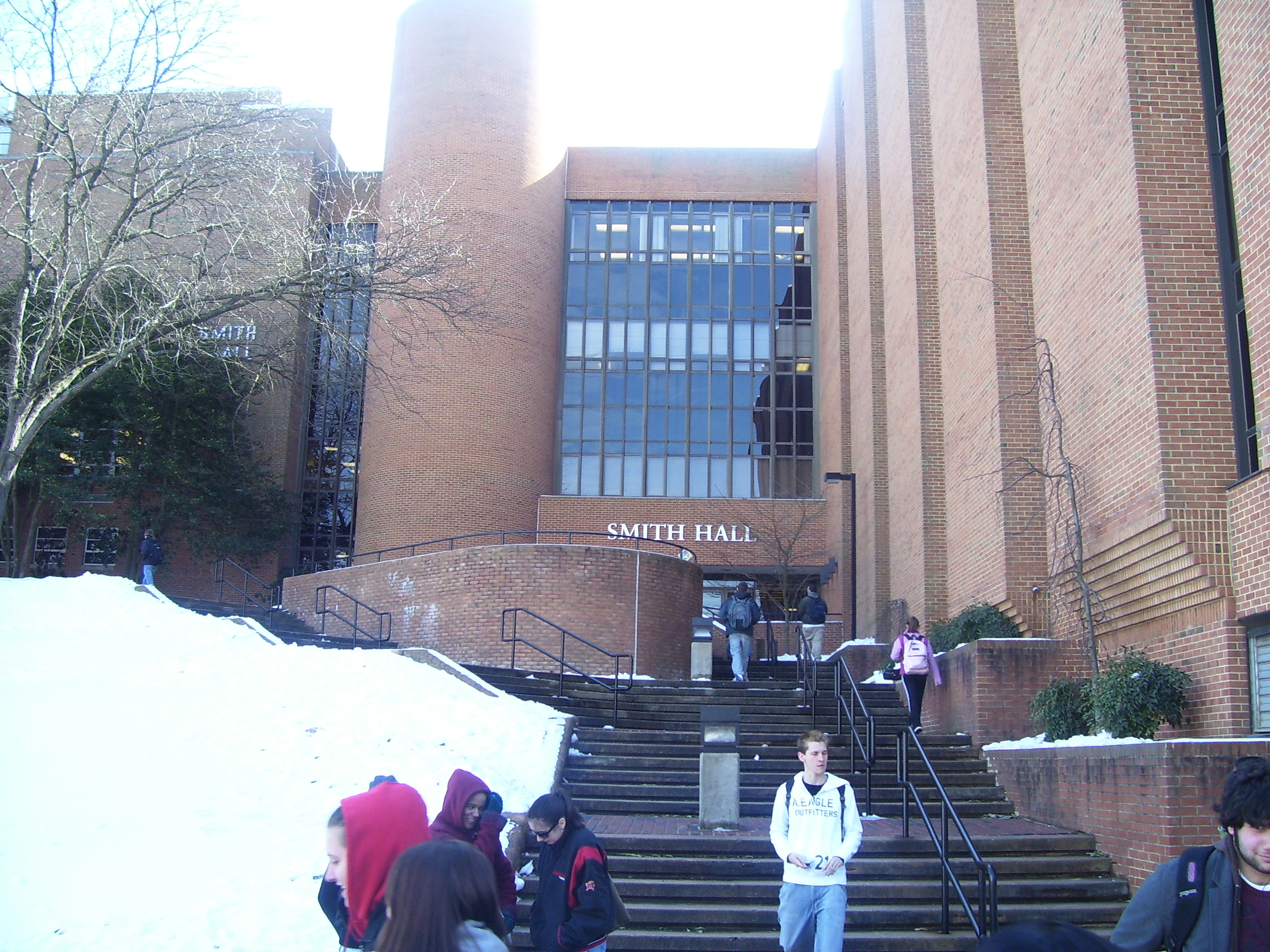
Smith Hall
1965
Former Biology and Sciences Building

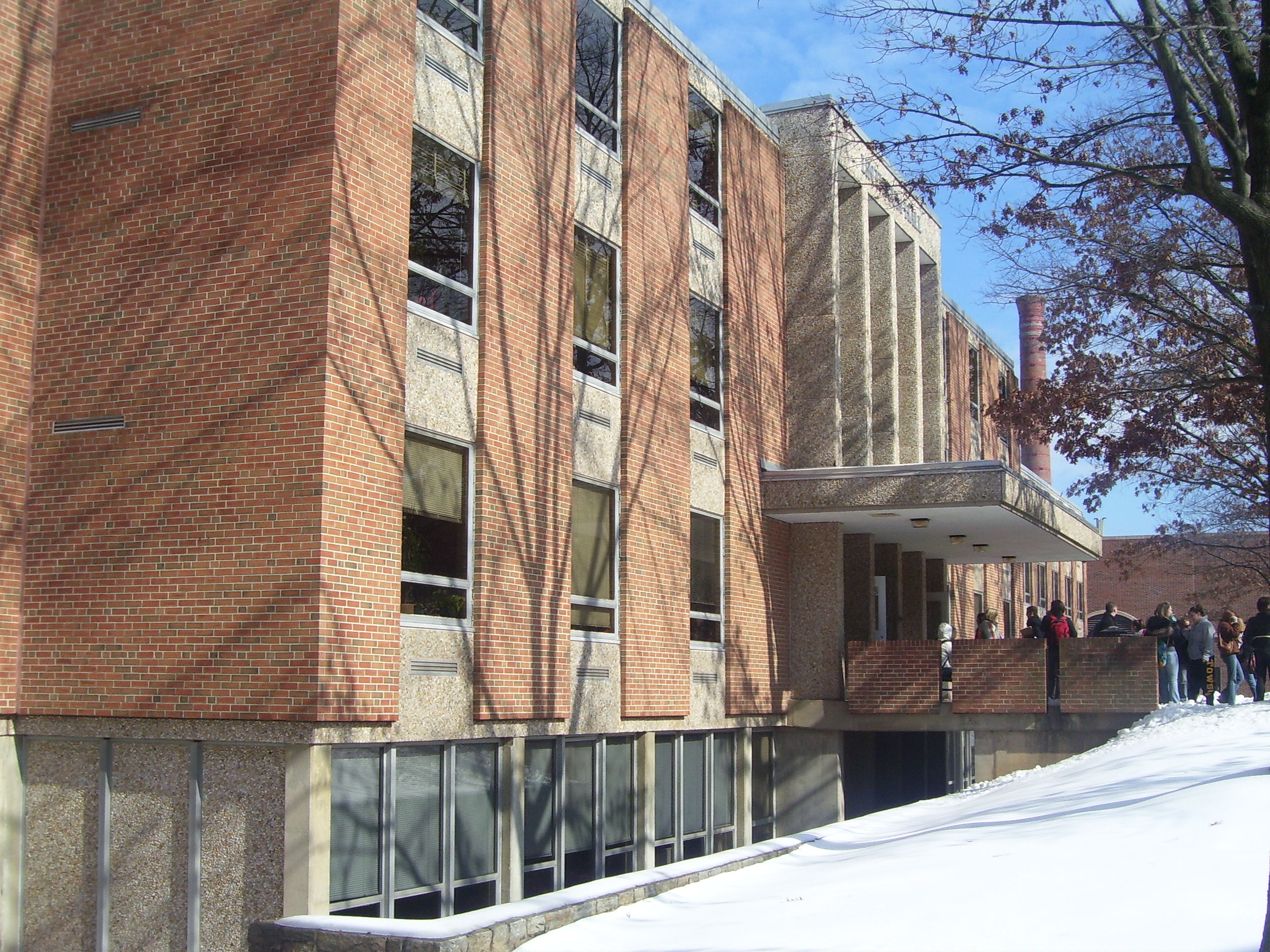
Linthicum Hall
1968
College of Liberal Arts

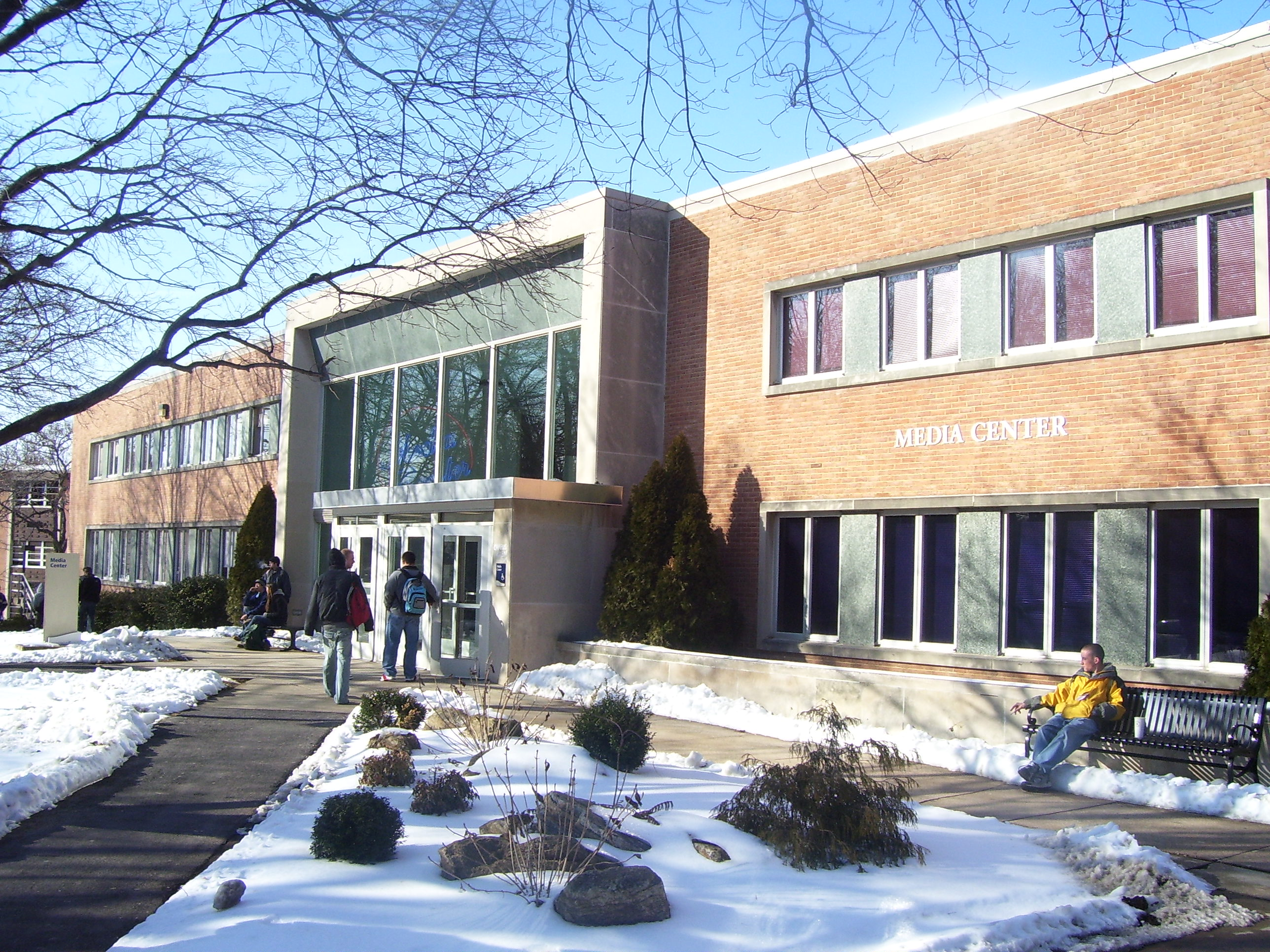
Media Center
Former Library
Department of Mass Communication and Communication Studies

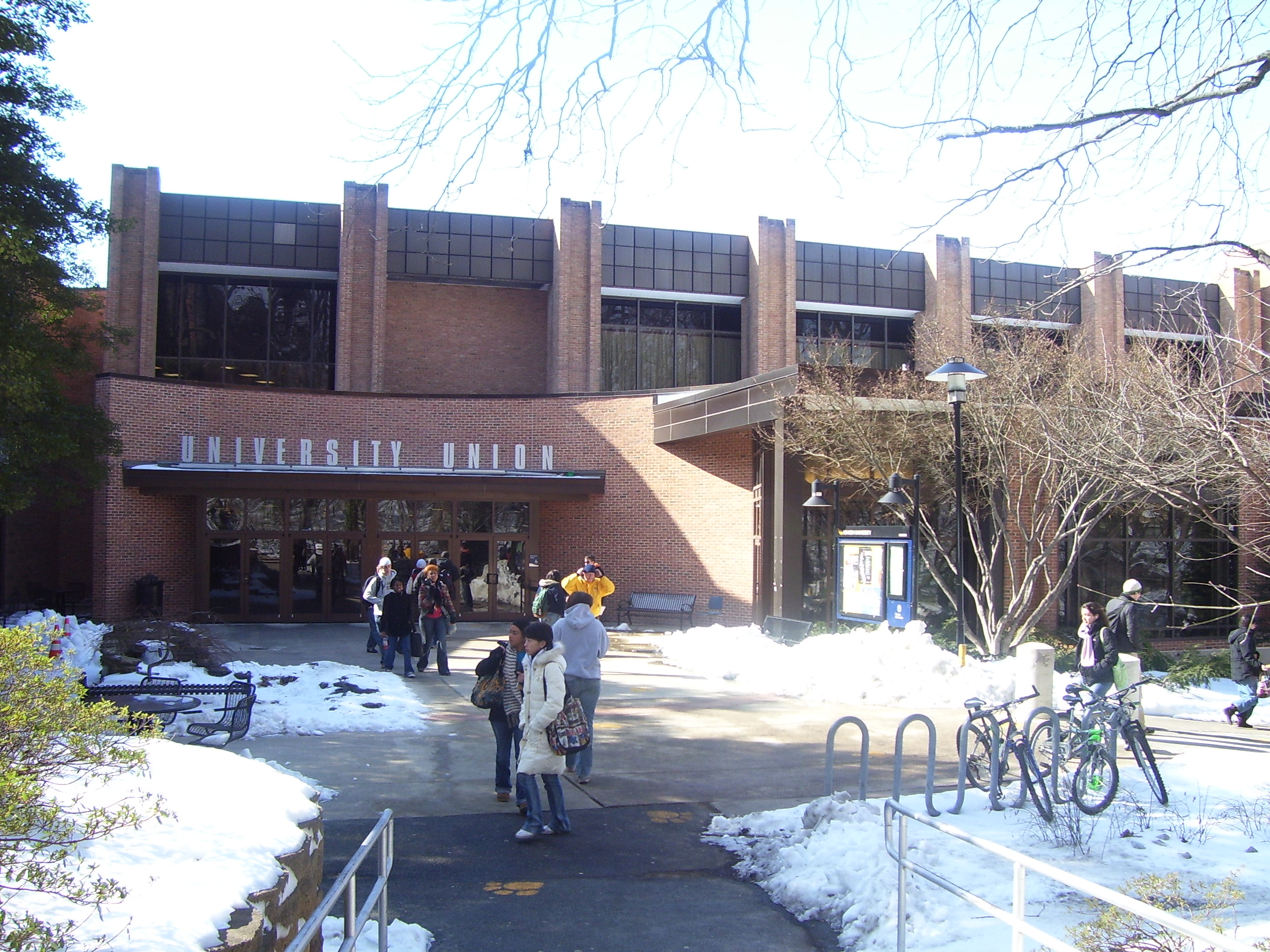
University Union
1972
Auxiliary Office
University Store

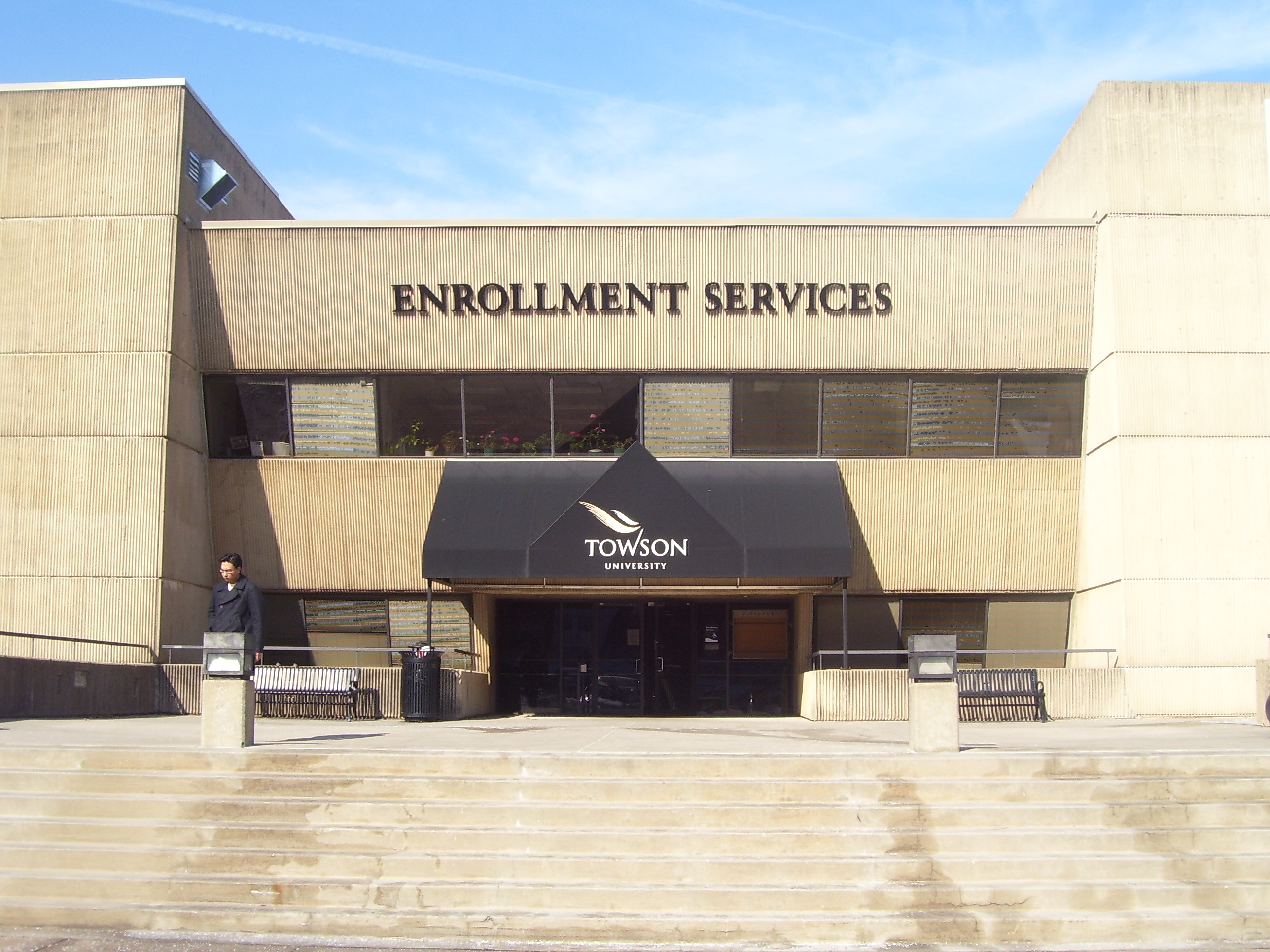
Enrollment Services
Former Administration Building
1972

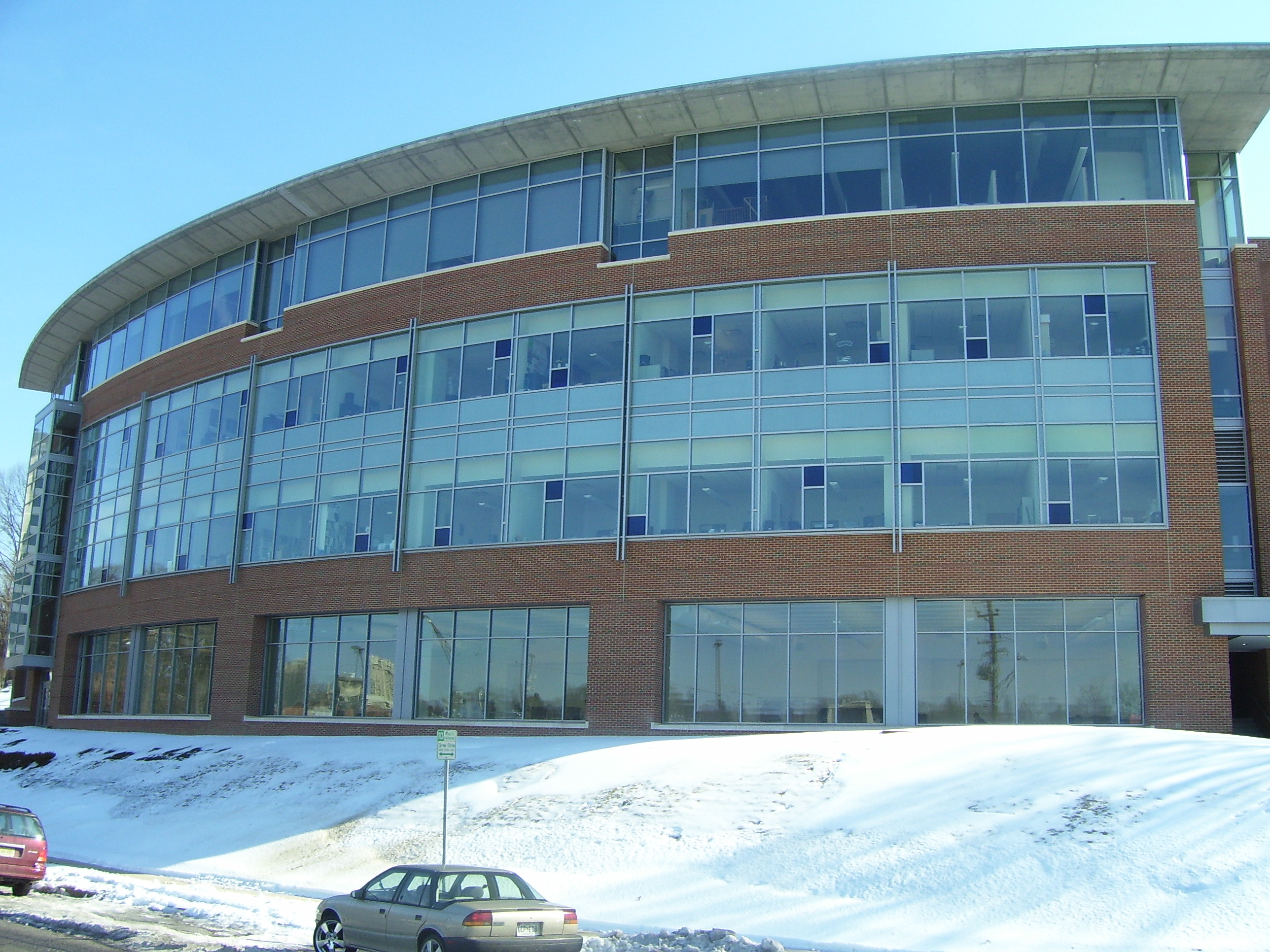
Center for the Arts
1973
College of Fine Arts & Communication

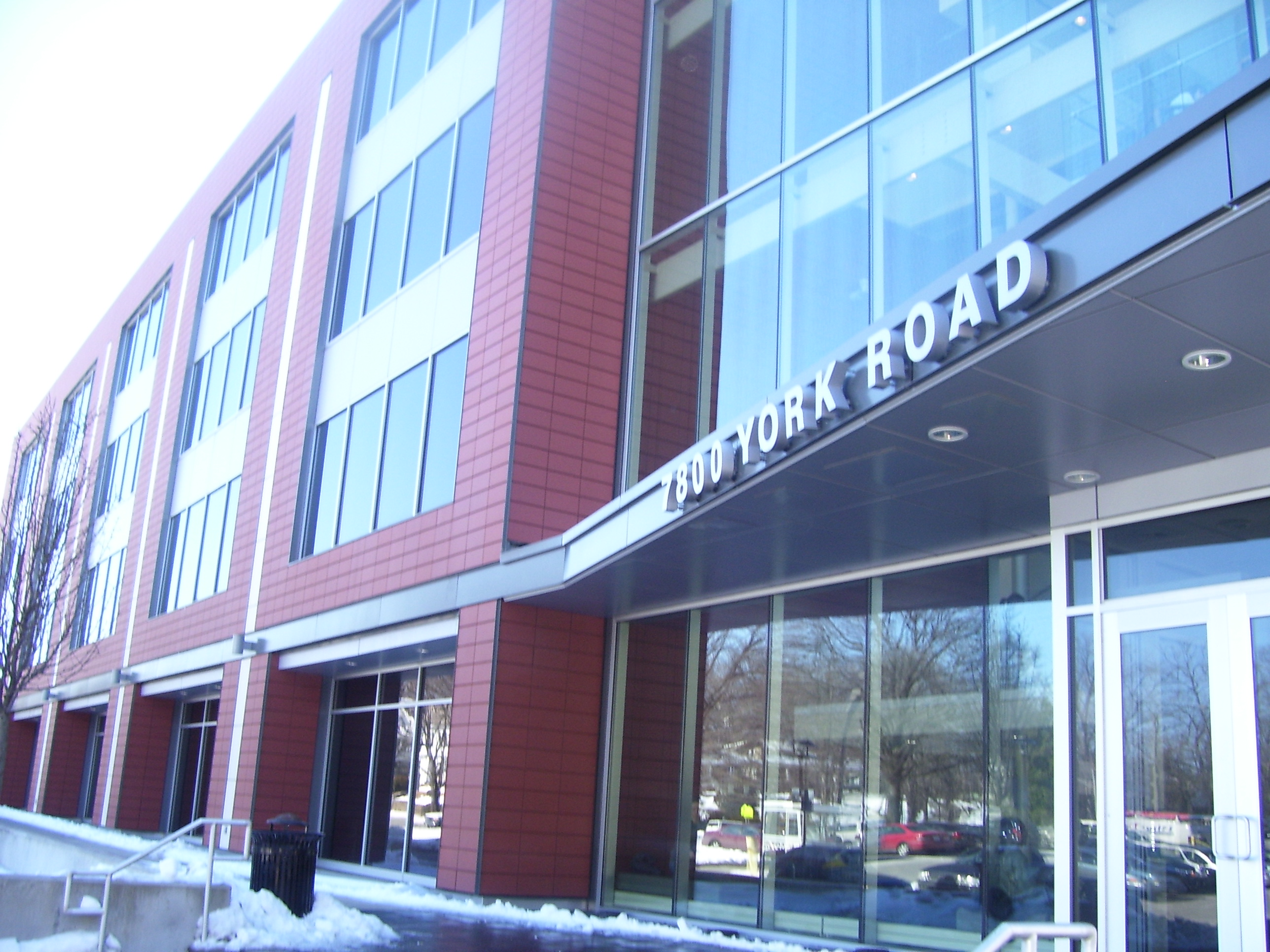
7800 York Road
2003
Department of Computer and Information Sciences, Math Department

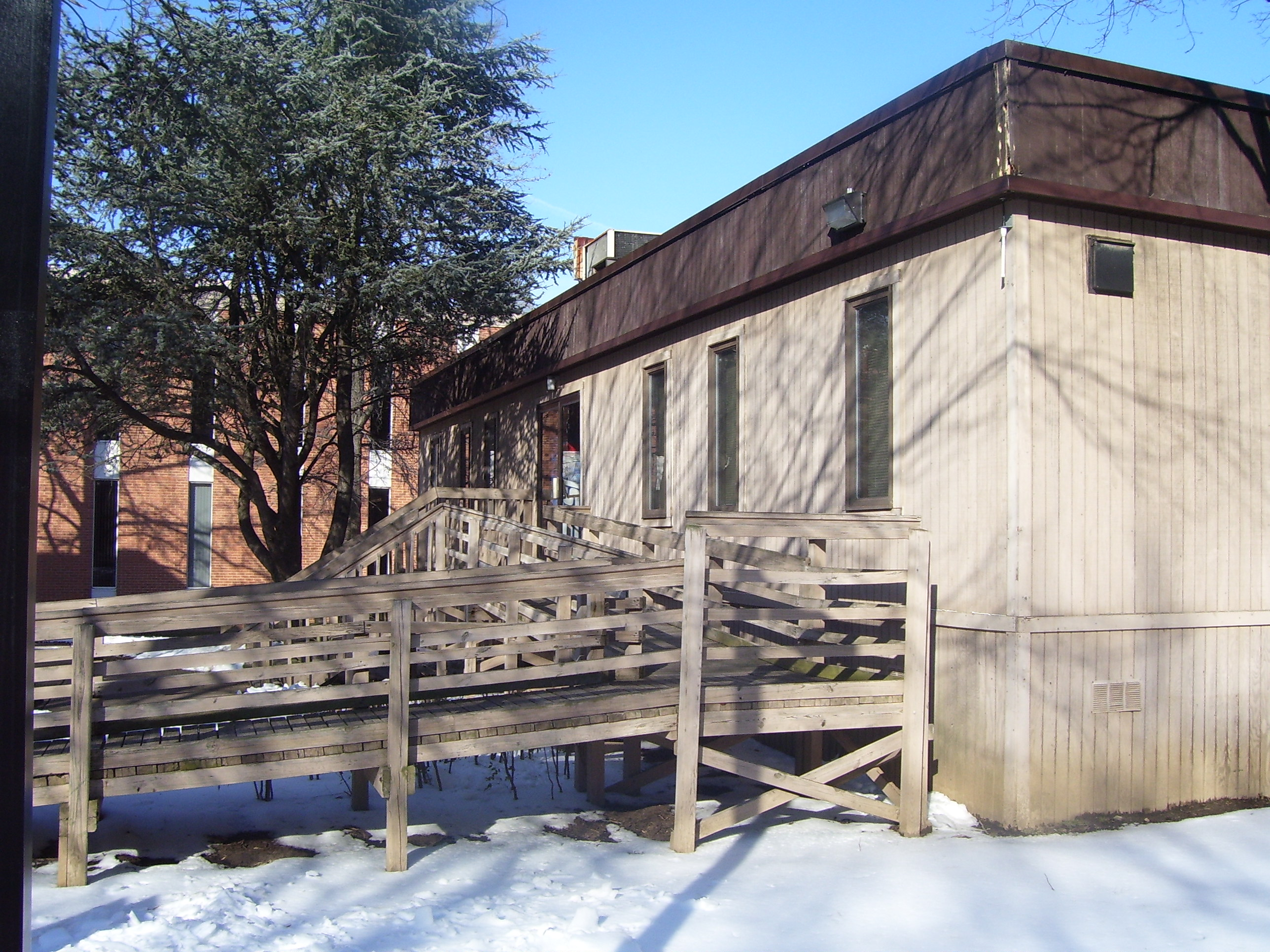
Stephens Hall Annex
Communication Offices
Army ROTC
Now Demolished

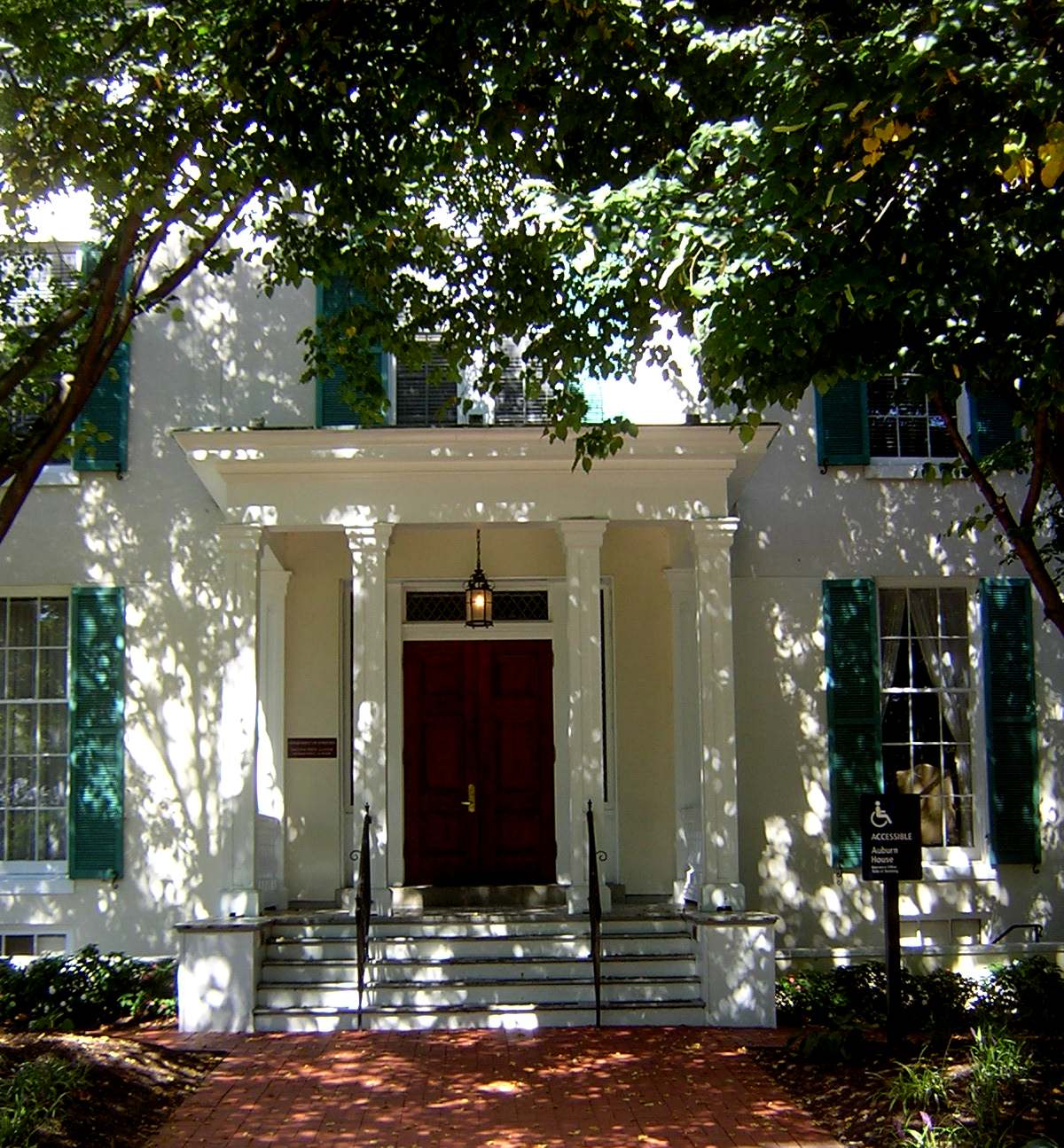
"Auburn House"
1790
National Register of Historic Places
T.U. Alumni House

== Non-academic ==
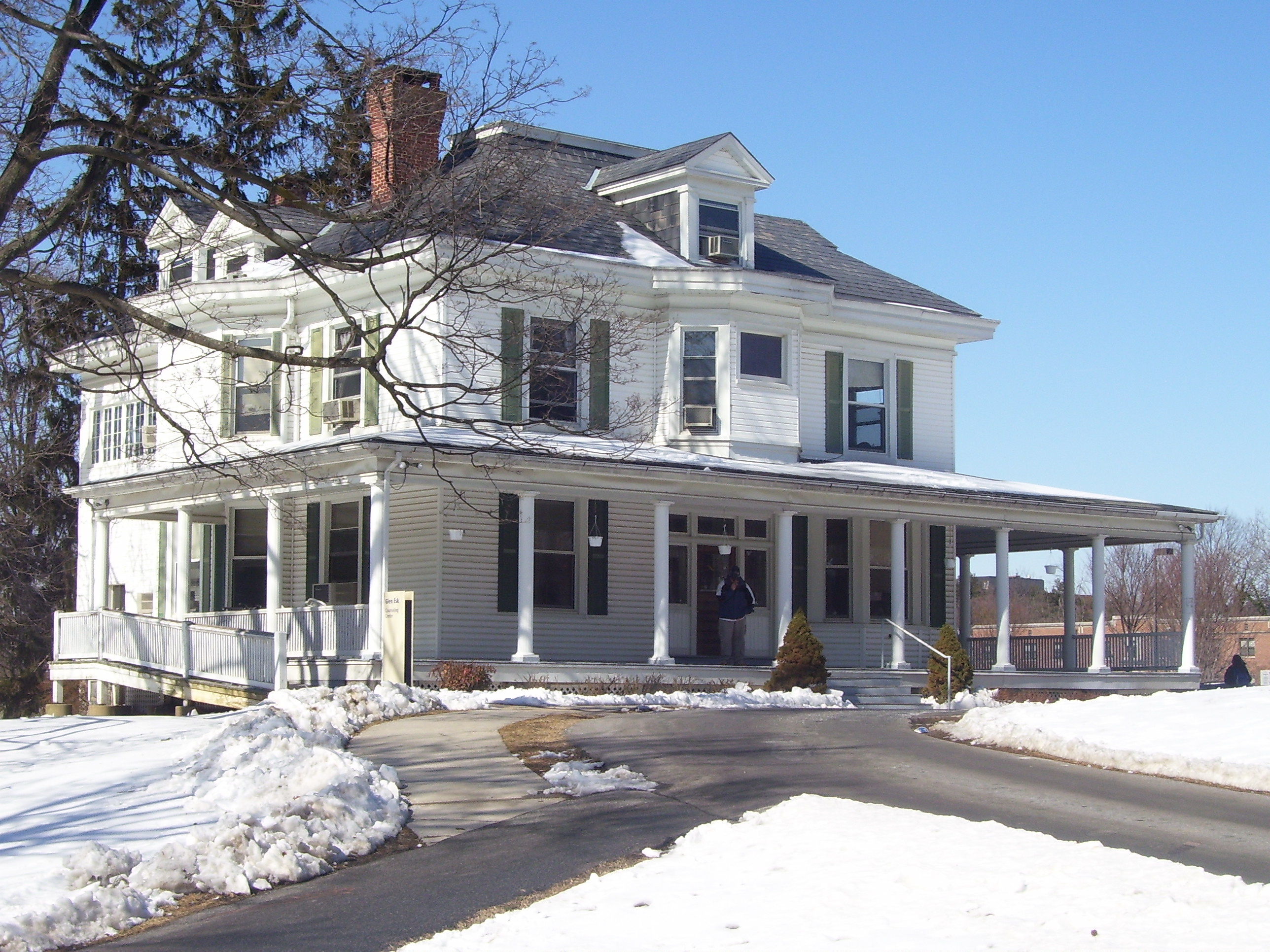
"Glen Esk" Counseling Center
Now demolished

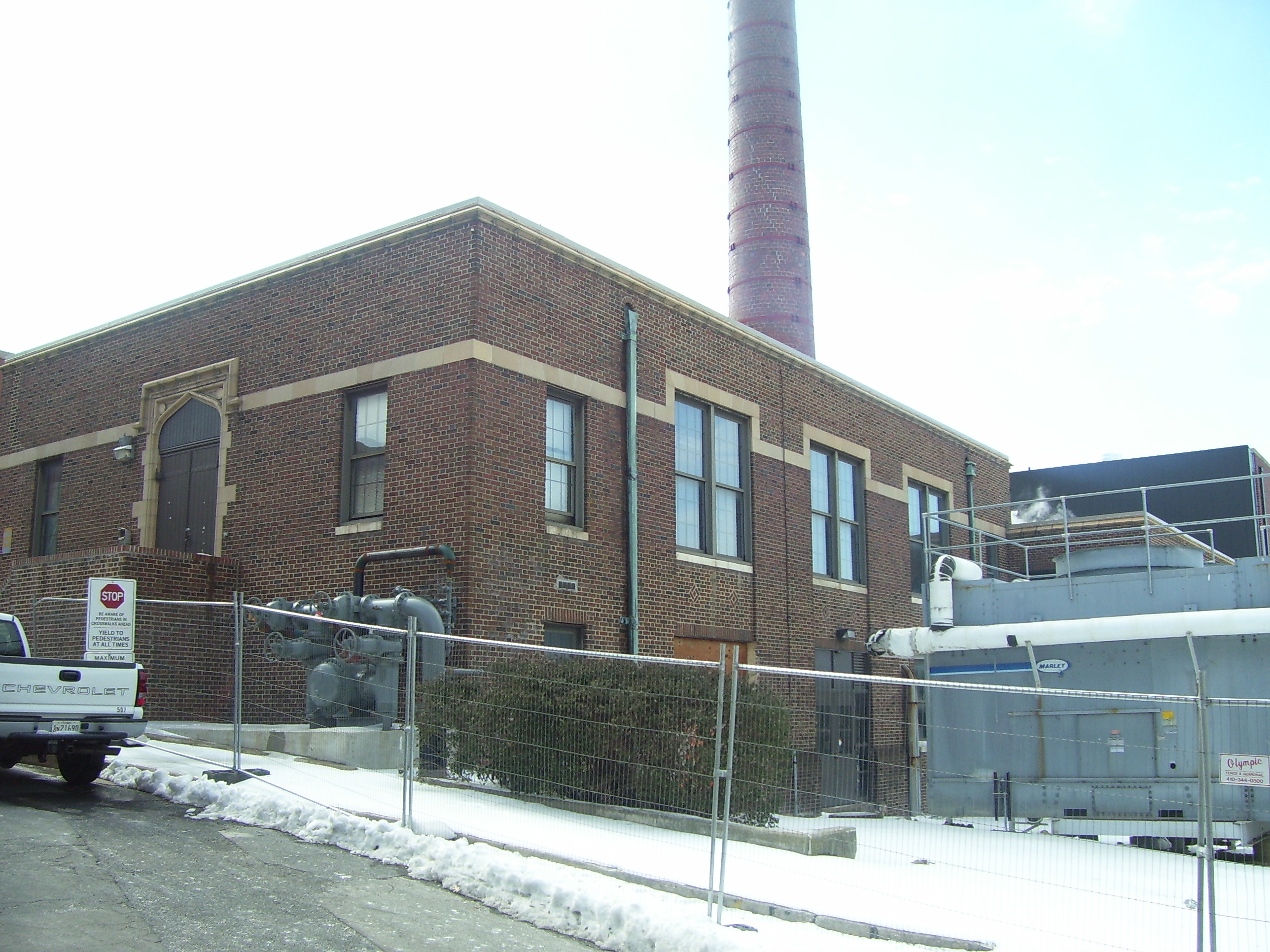
Power Plant
1915

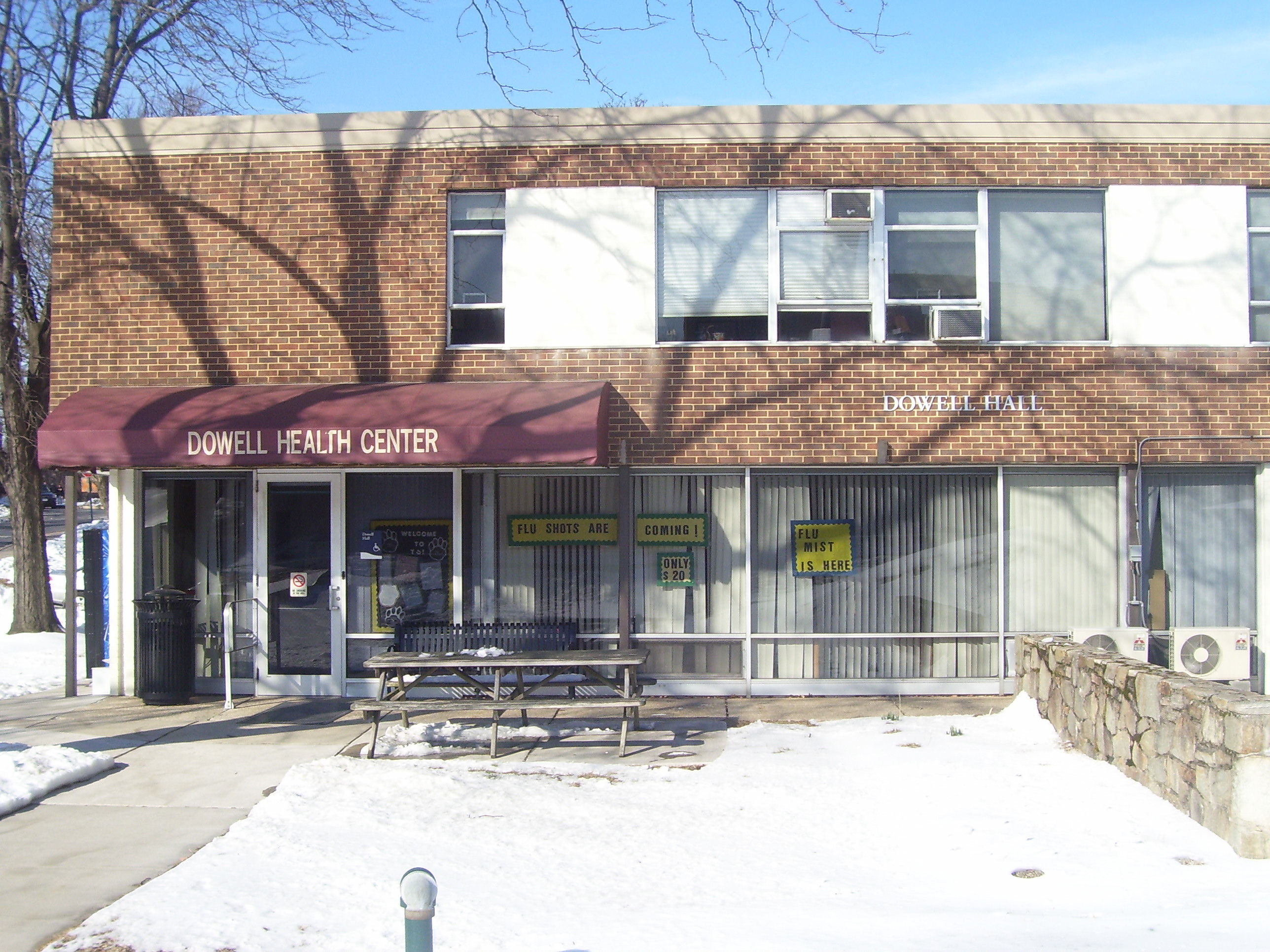
Dowell Hall
Health Facility
1962
Now demolished

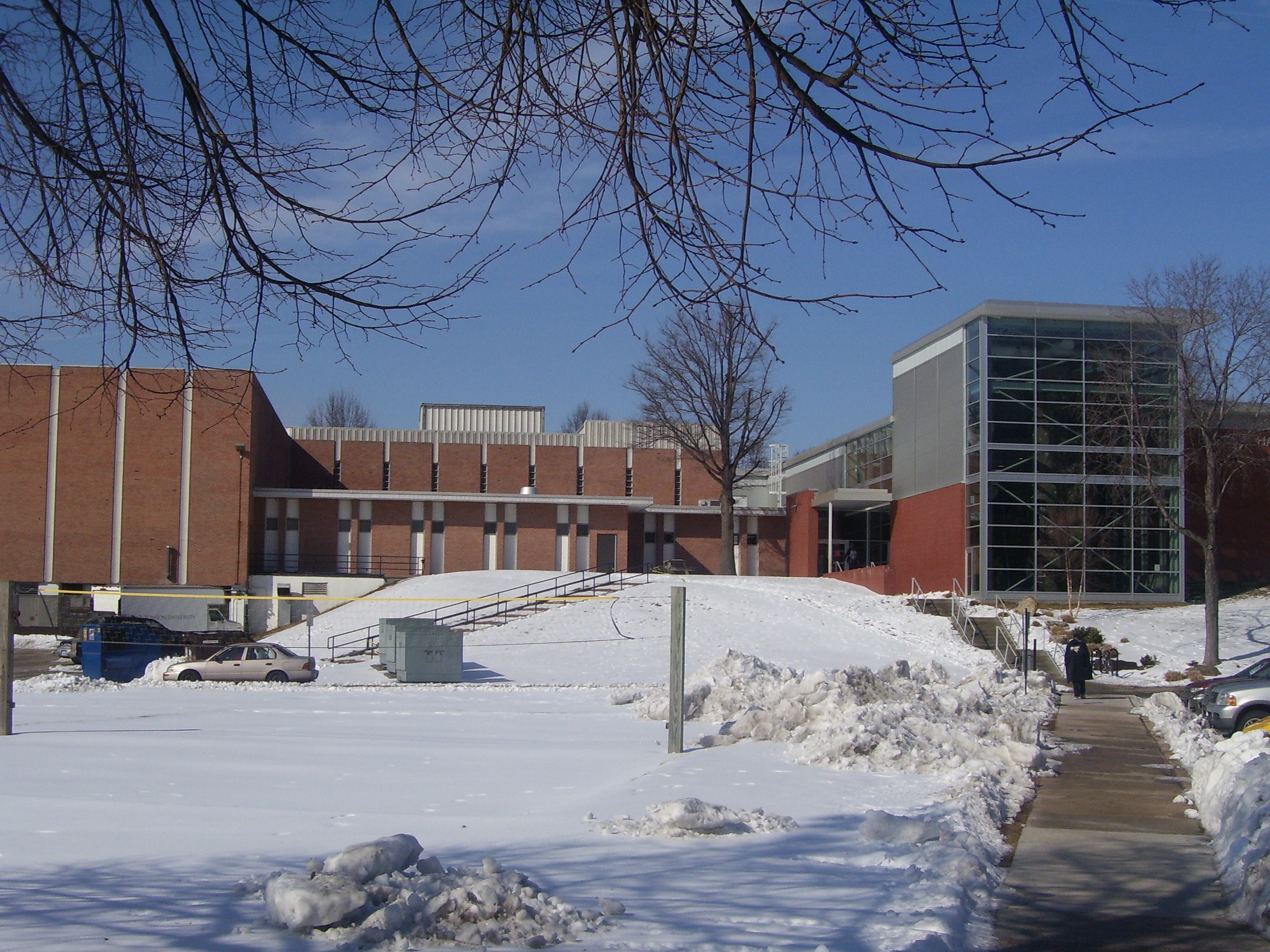
Burdick Hall
Gymnasium, Weight Room, Sports Facility
1967

== Residence buildings ==
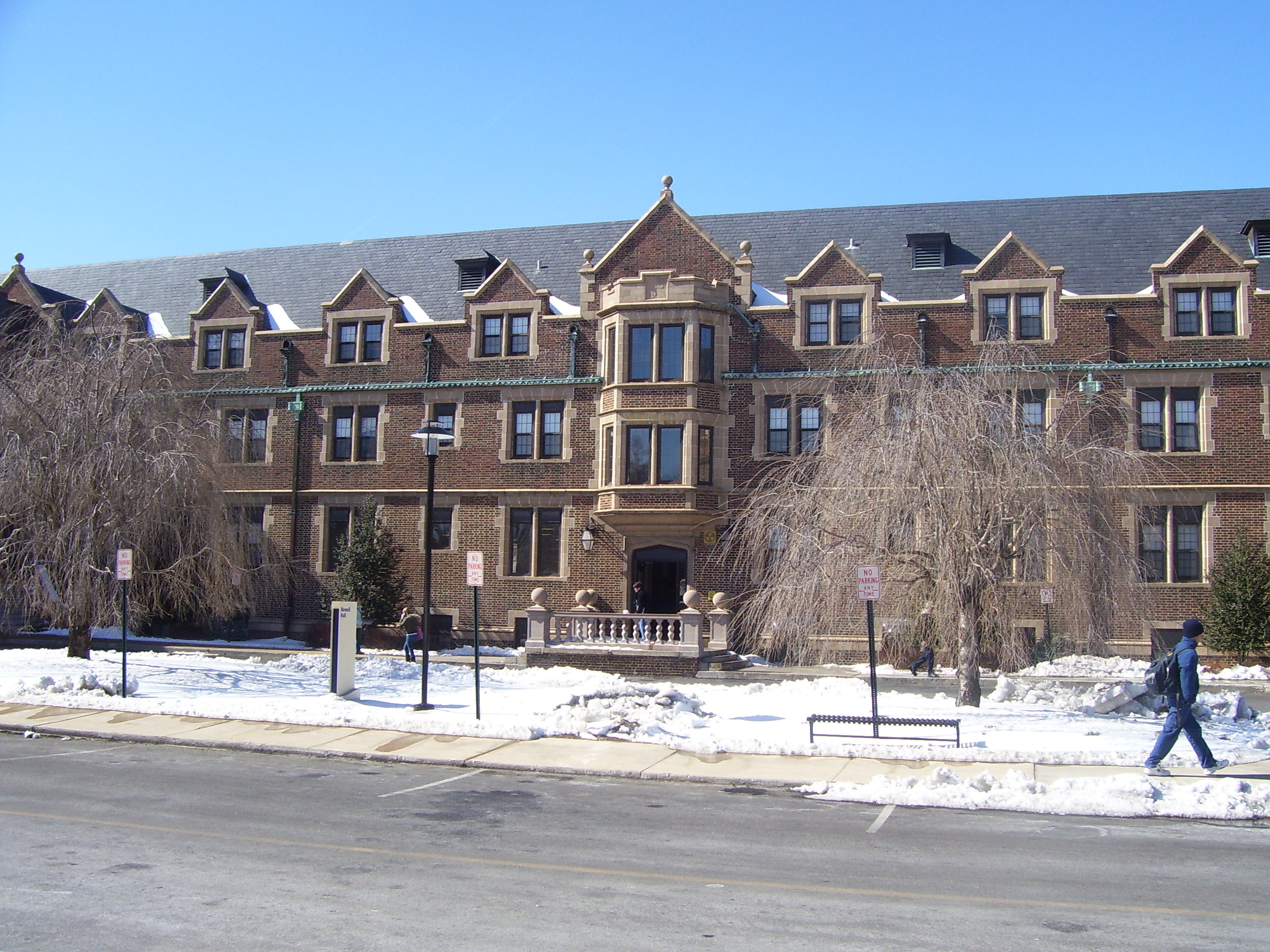
Newell Hall
1915

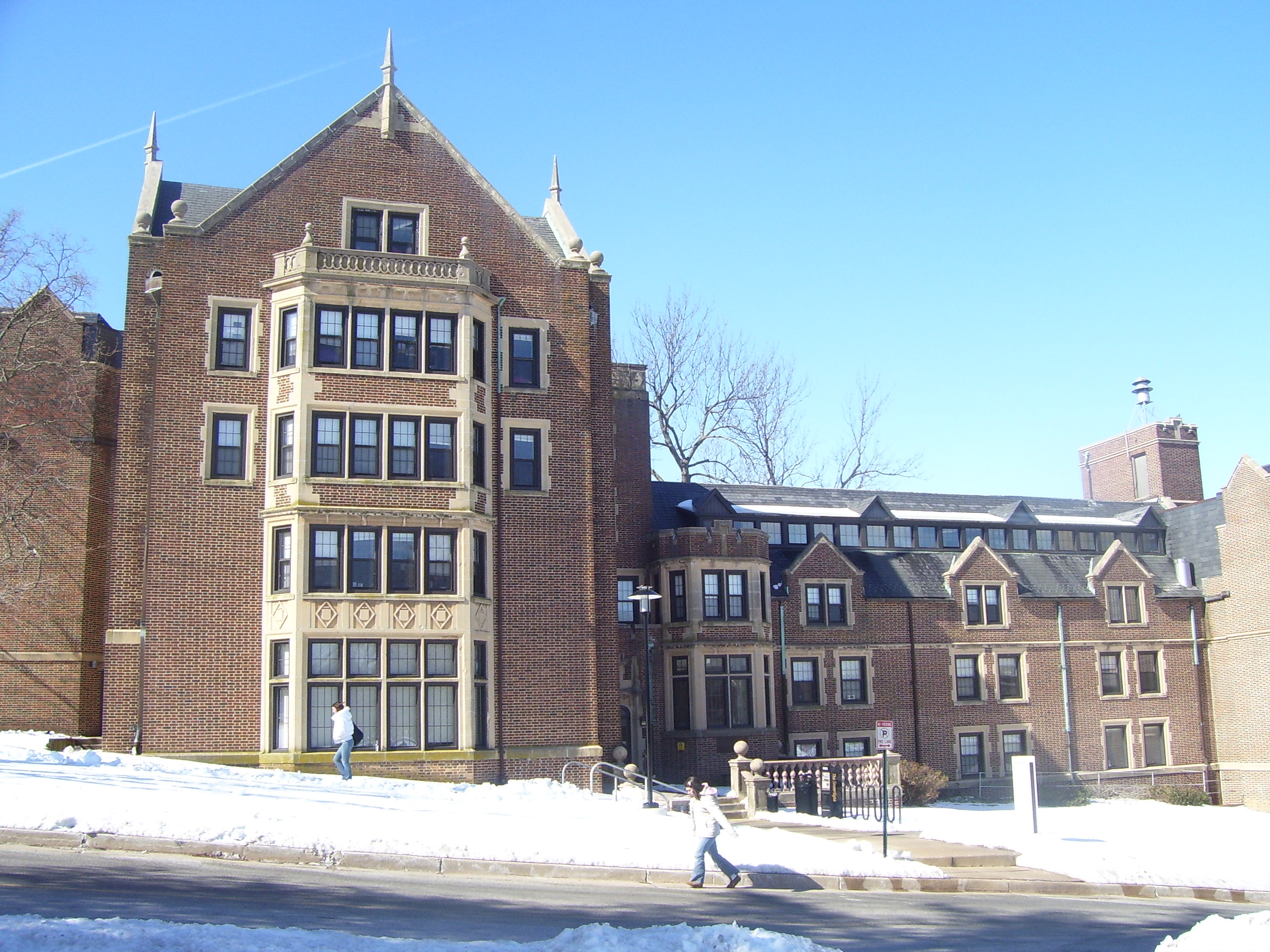
Richmond Hall
1924

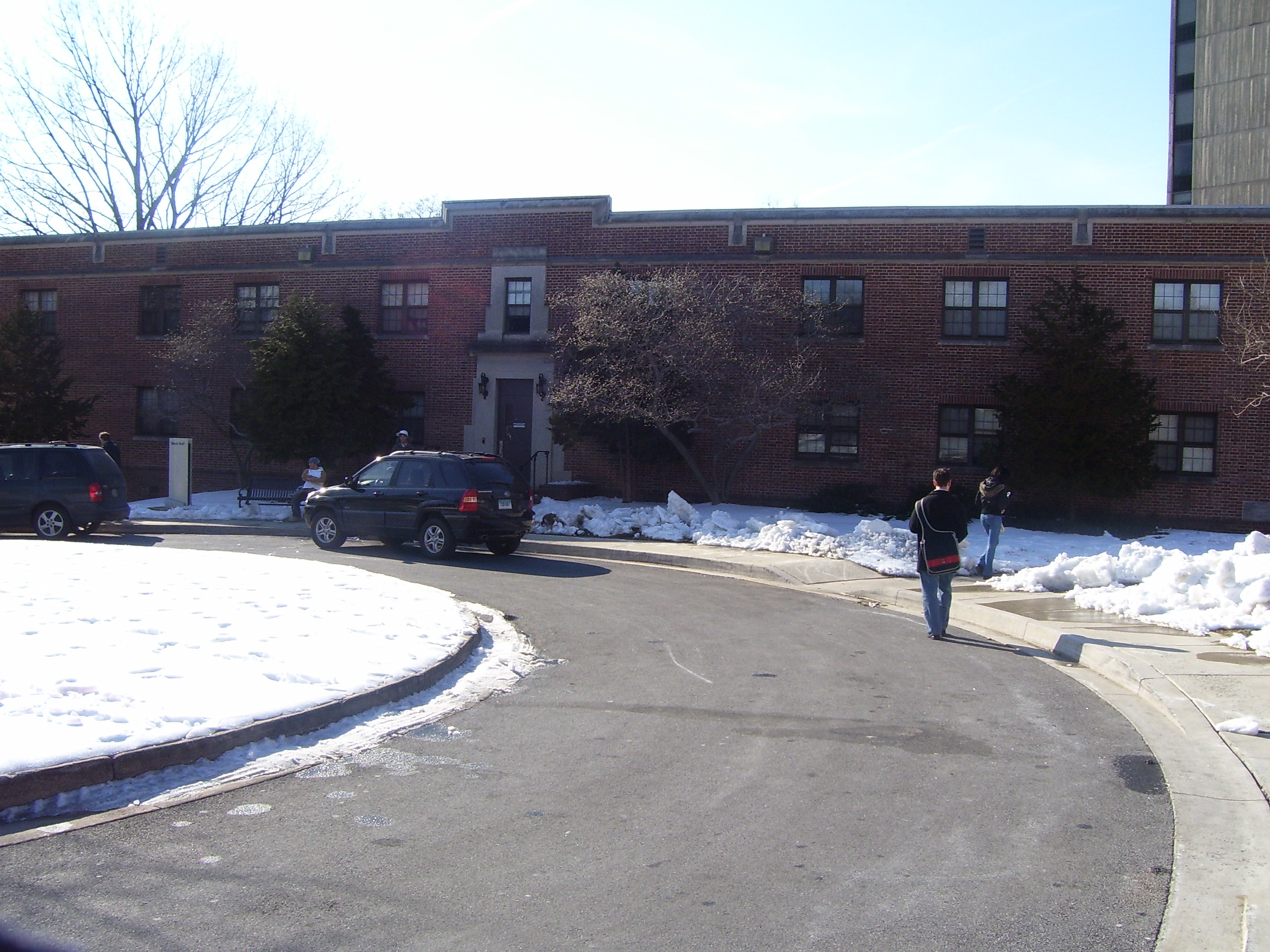
West Hall
1951

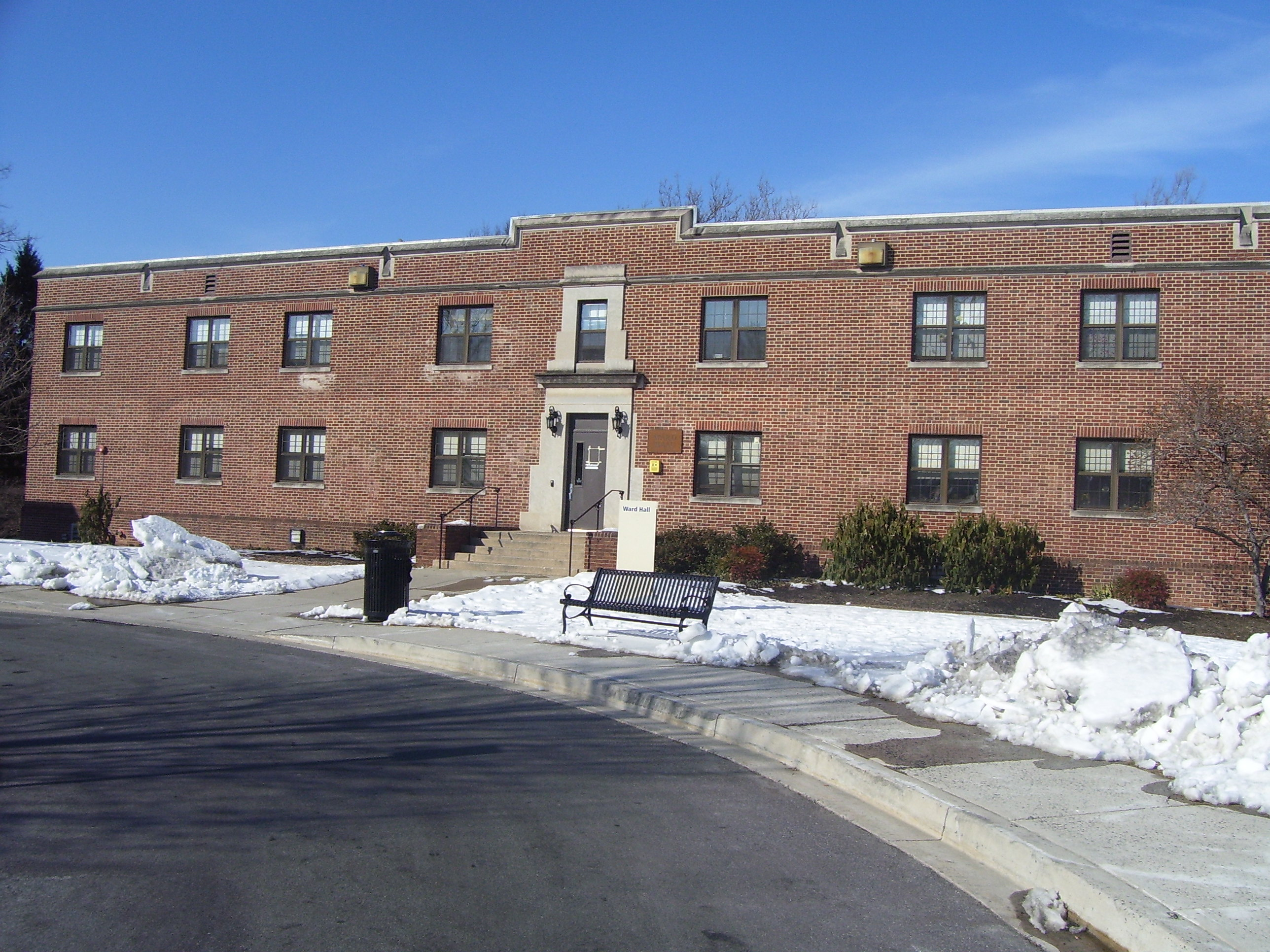
Ward Hall
1951

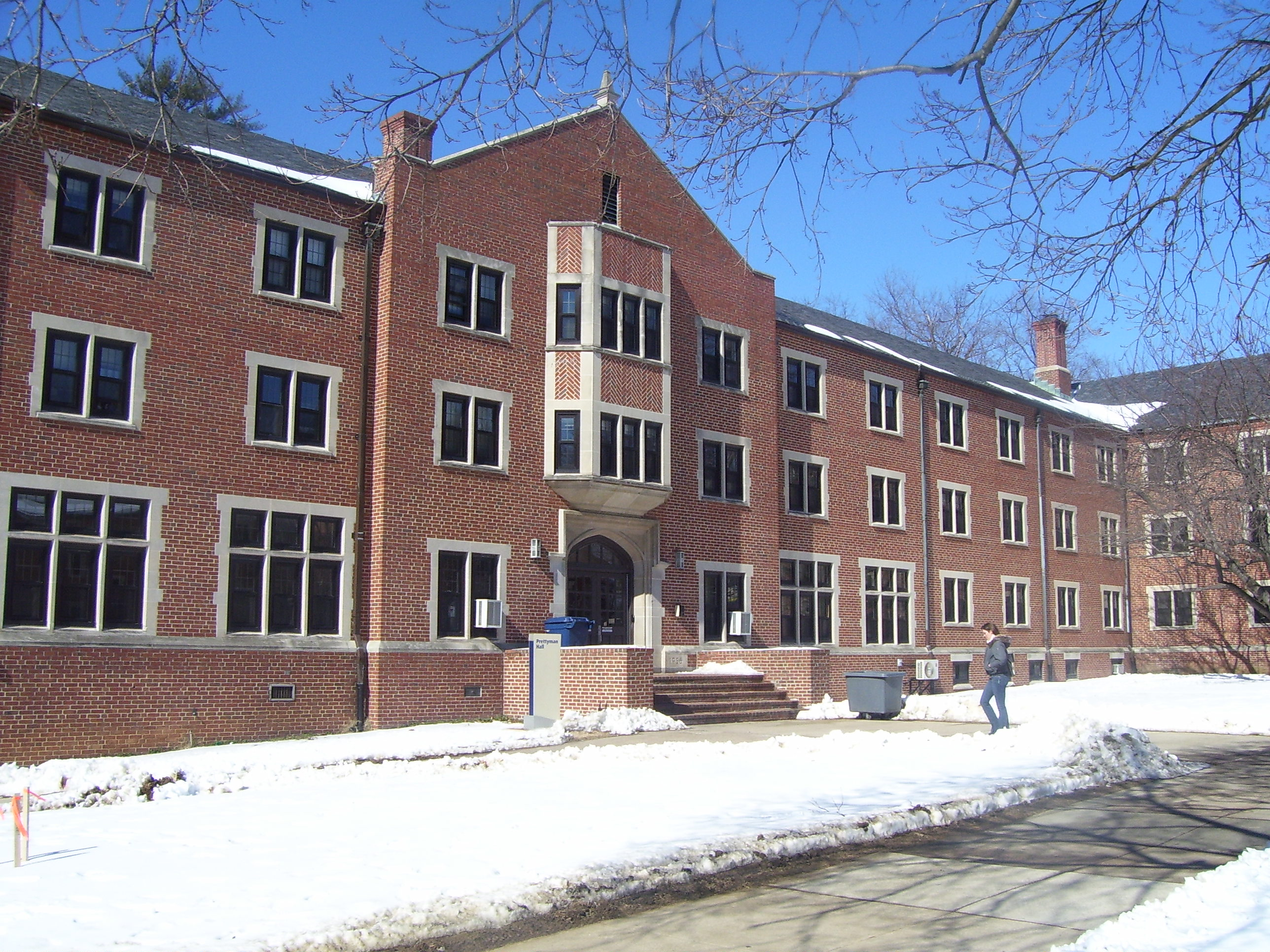
Prettyman Hall
1957

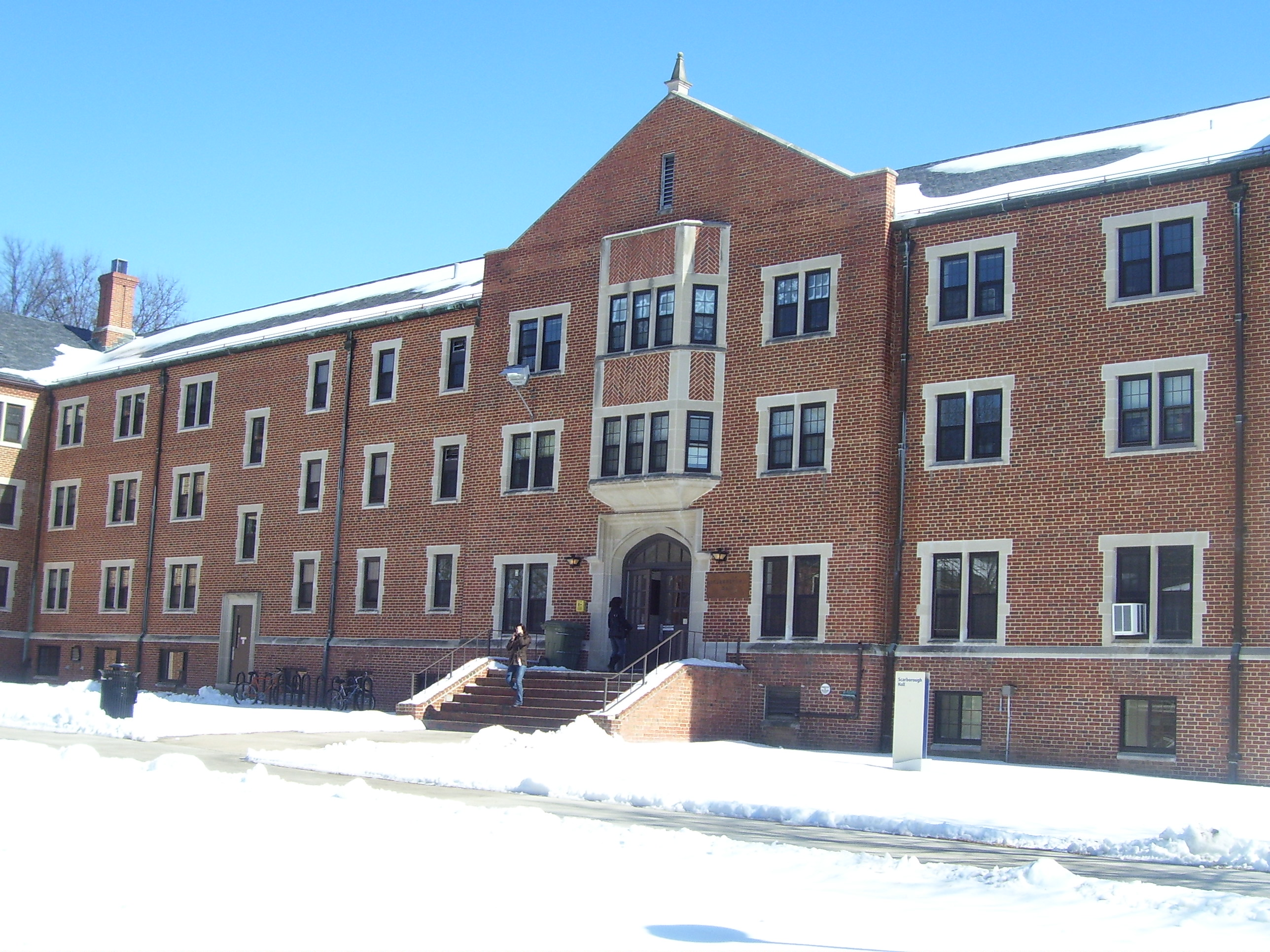
Scarborough Hall
1964

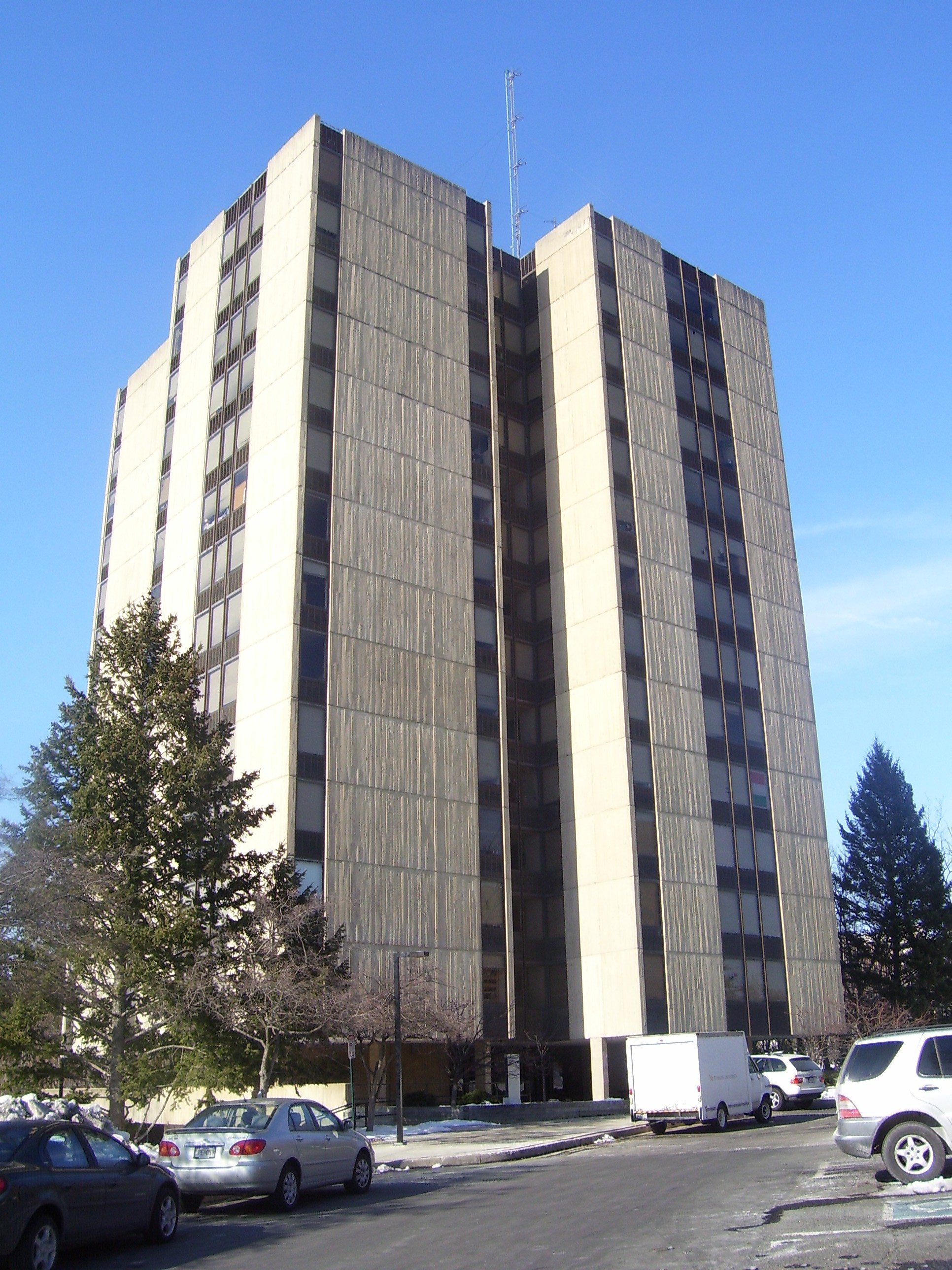
Residence Tower
1972

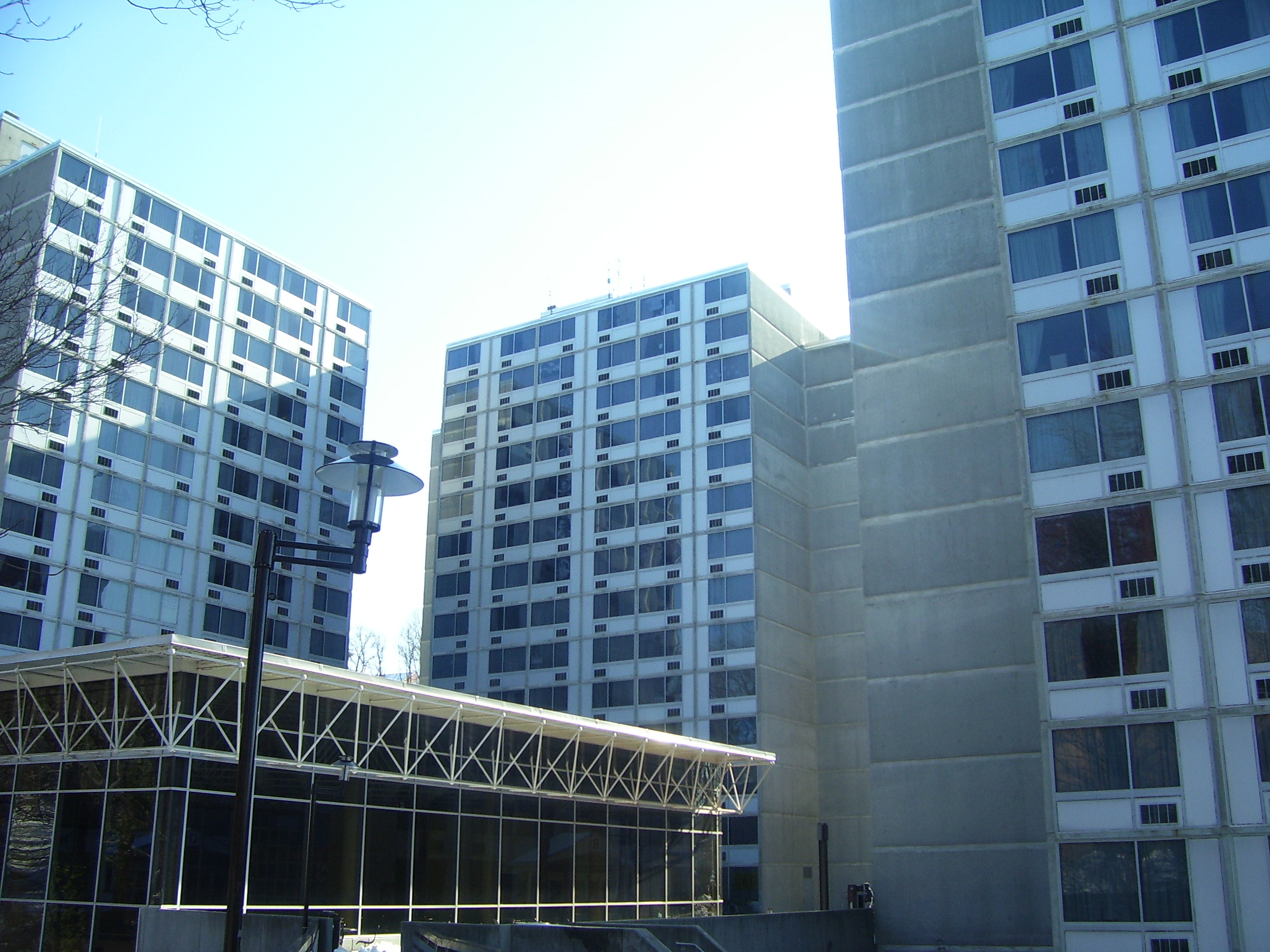
Glen Complex
1983

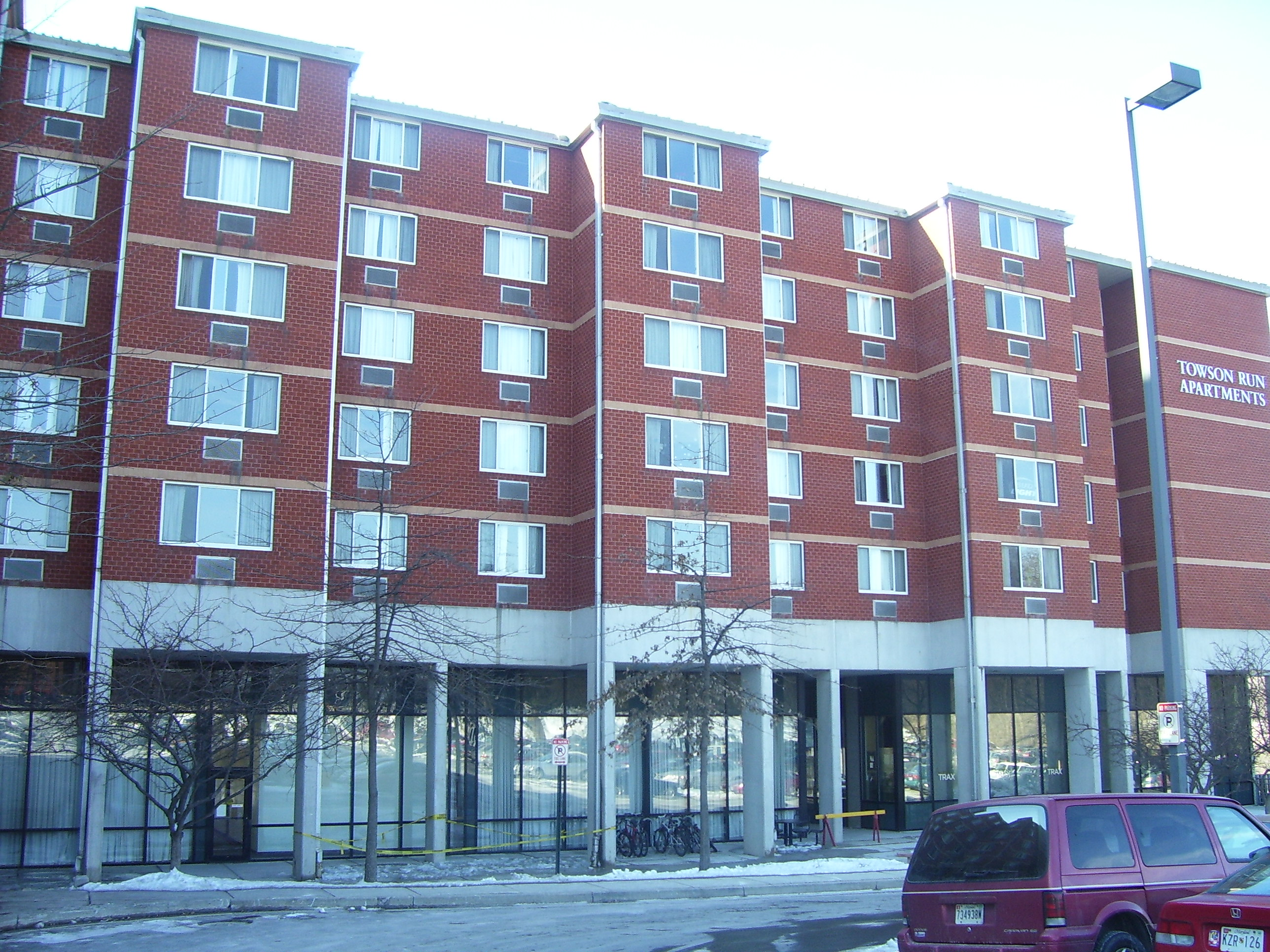
Towson Run Apartments
1989

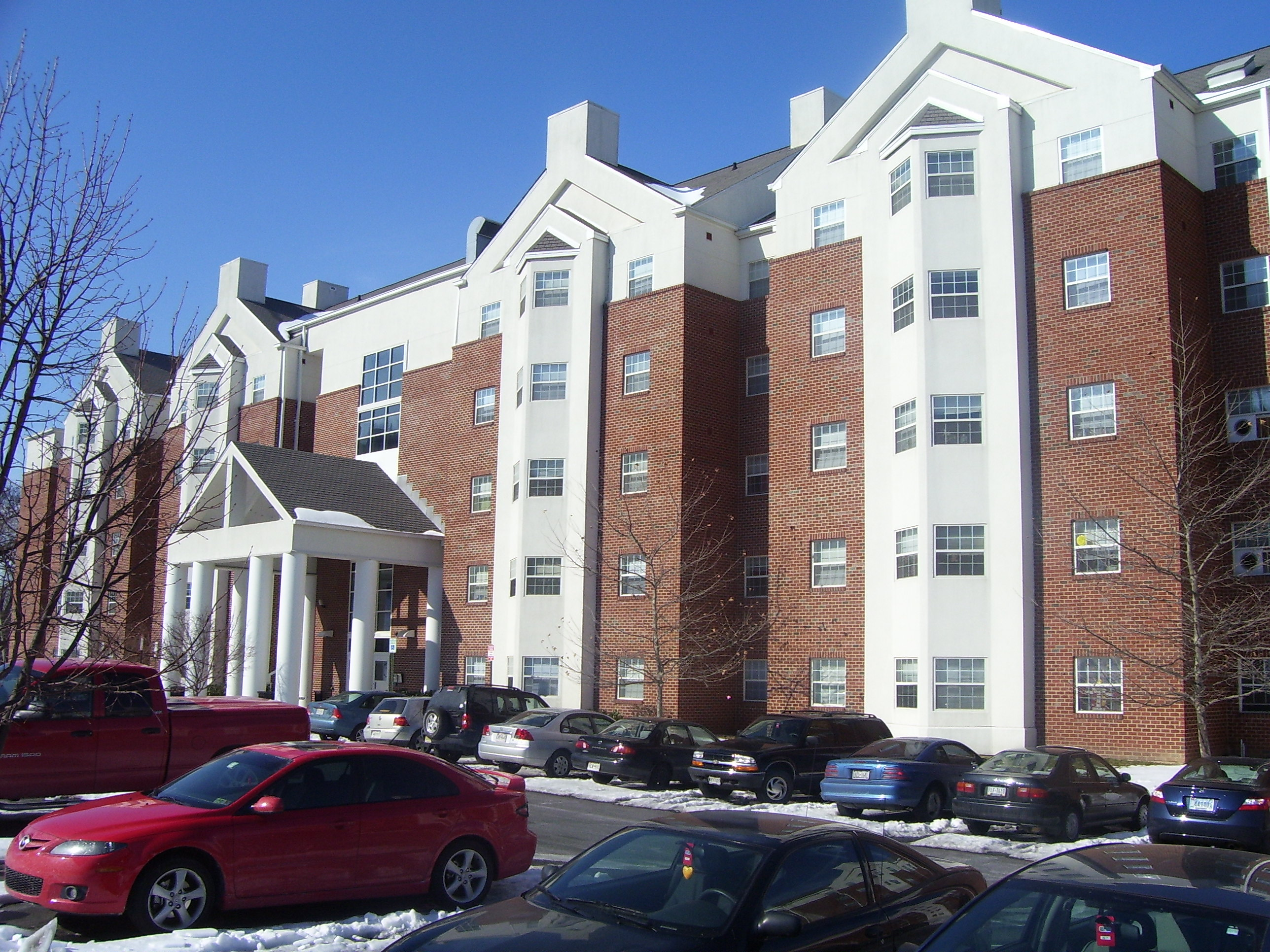
Millennium Hall
2000

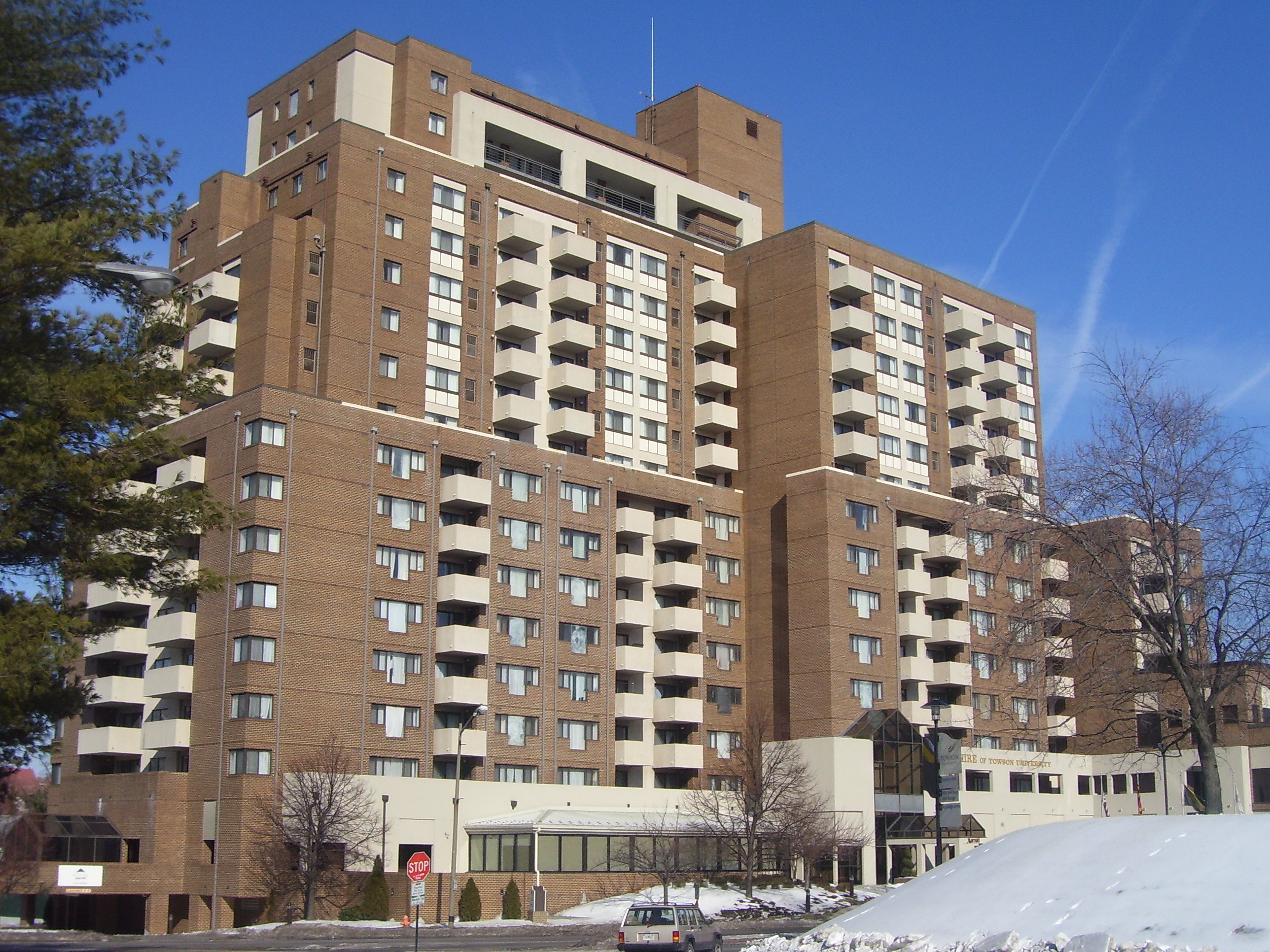
The Residences at 10 West Burke Avenue

== Dining halls and facilities ==
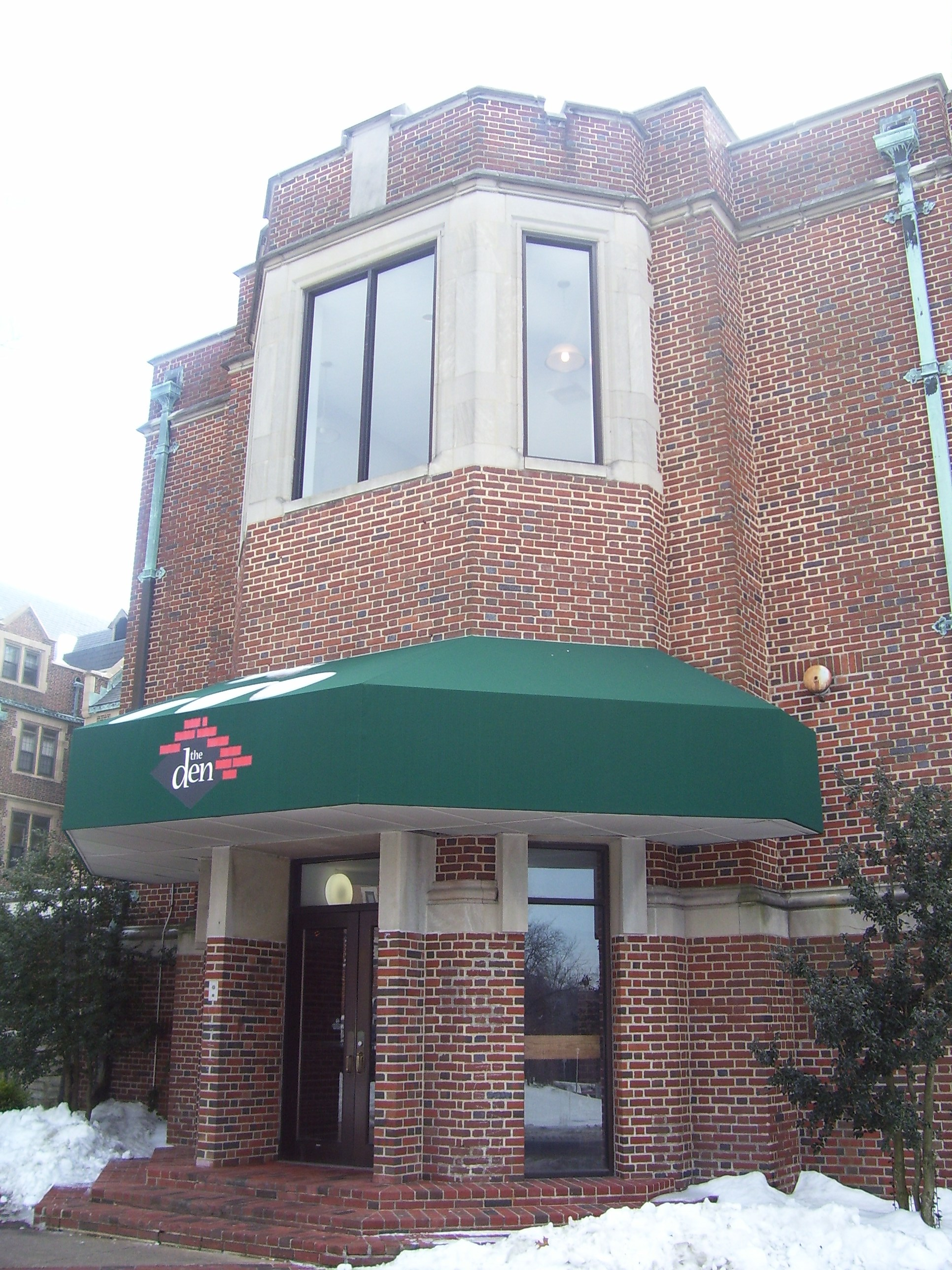
Newell Dining Hall
Newell Den

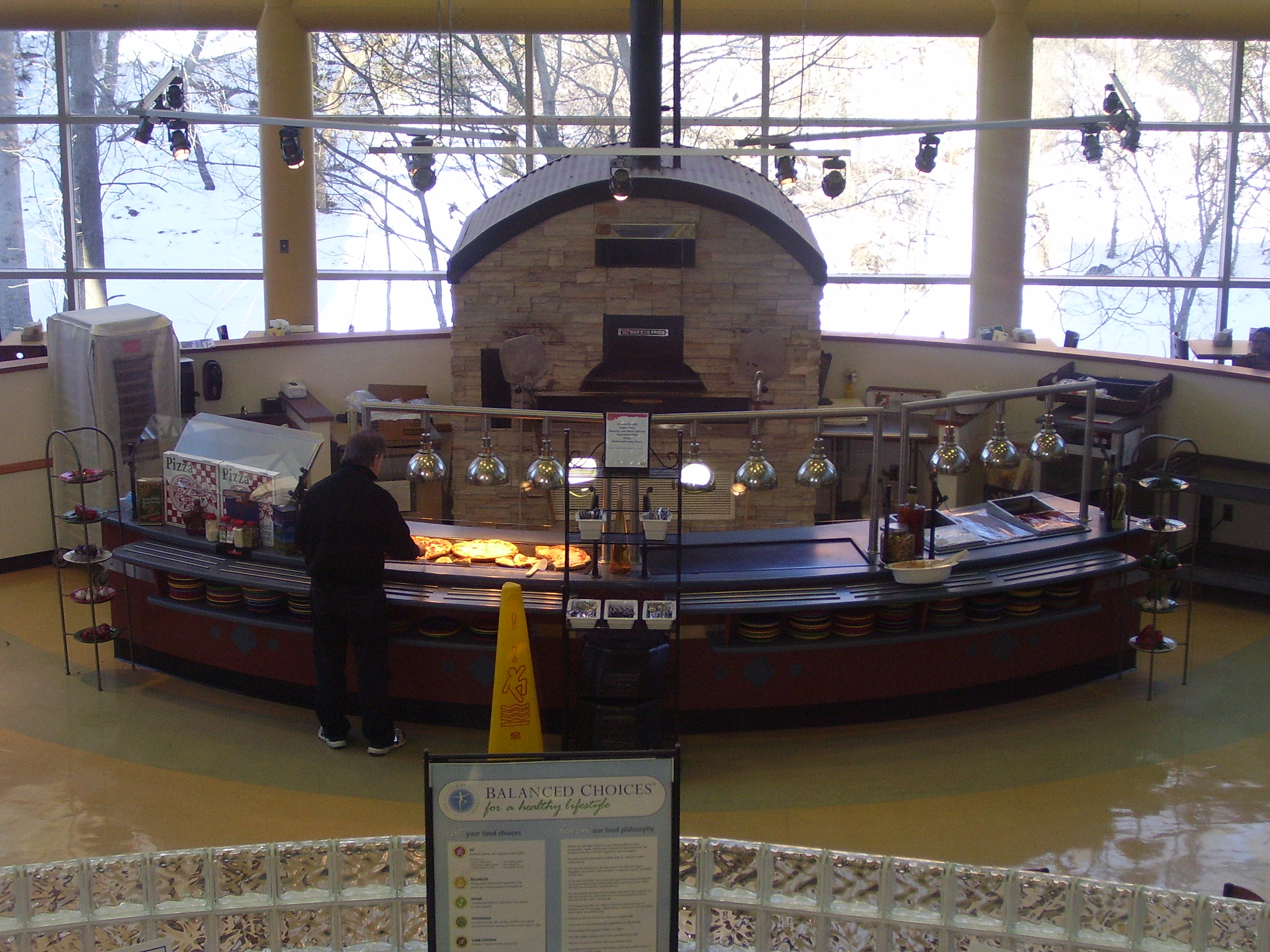
Glen Dining Hall

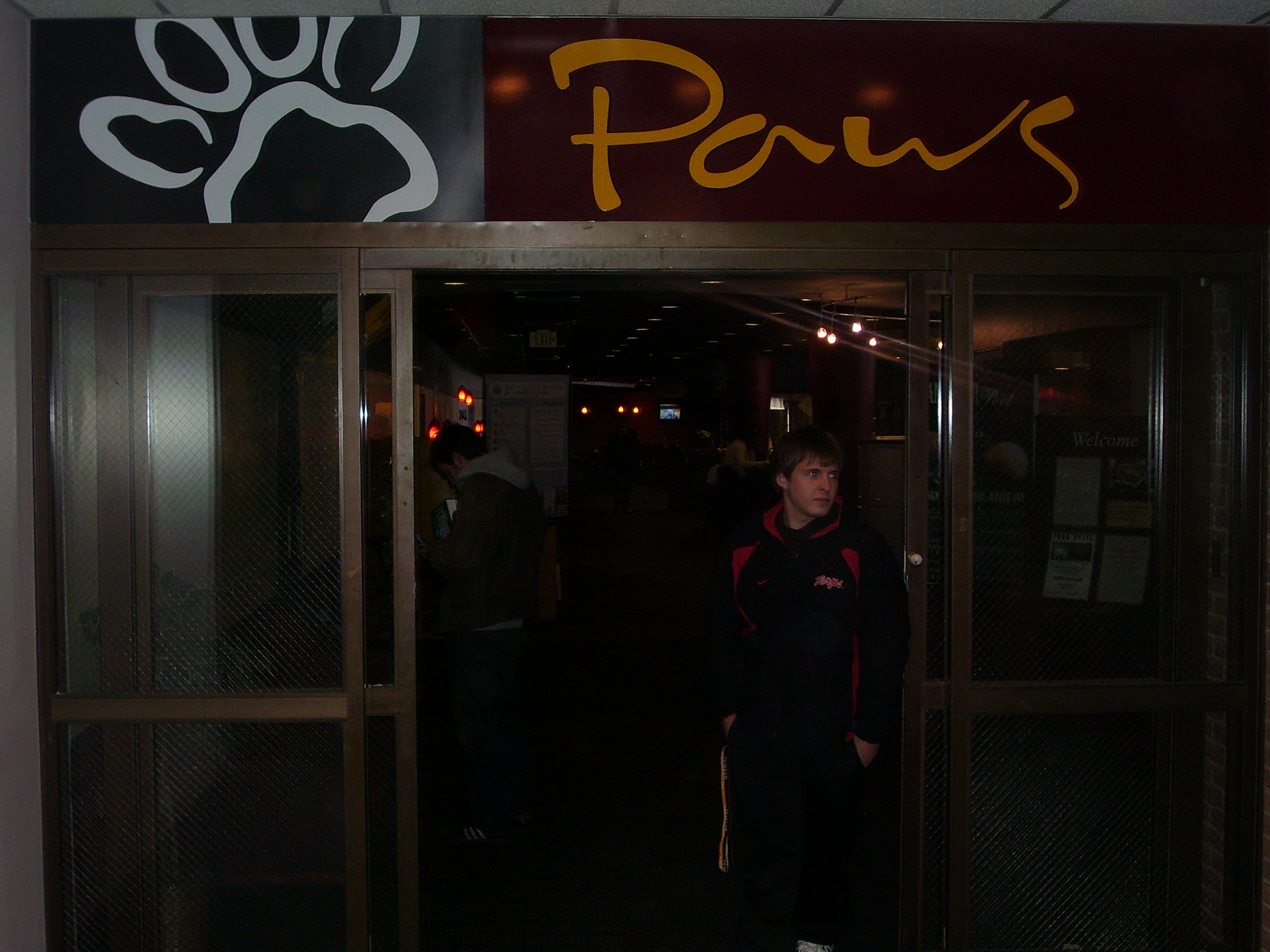
PAWS

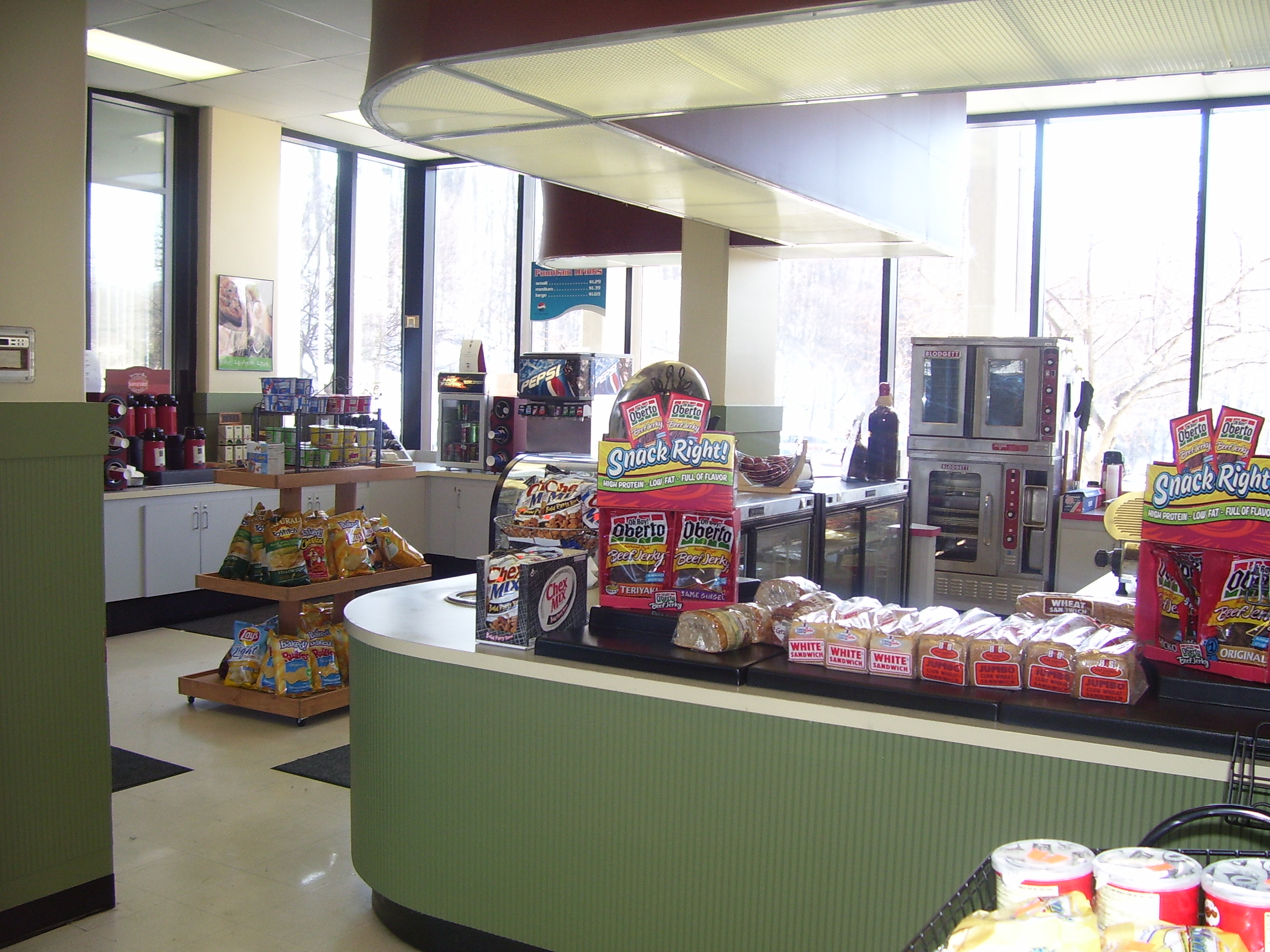
TRAX

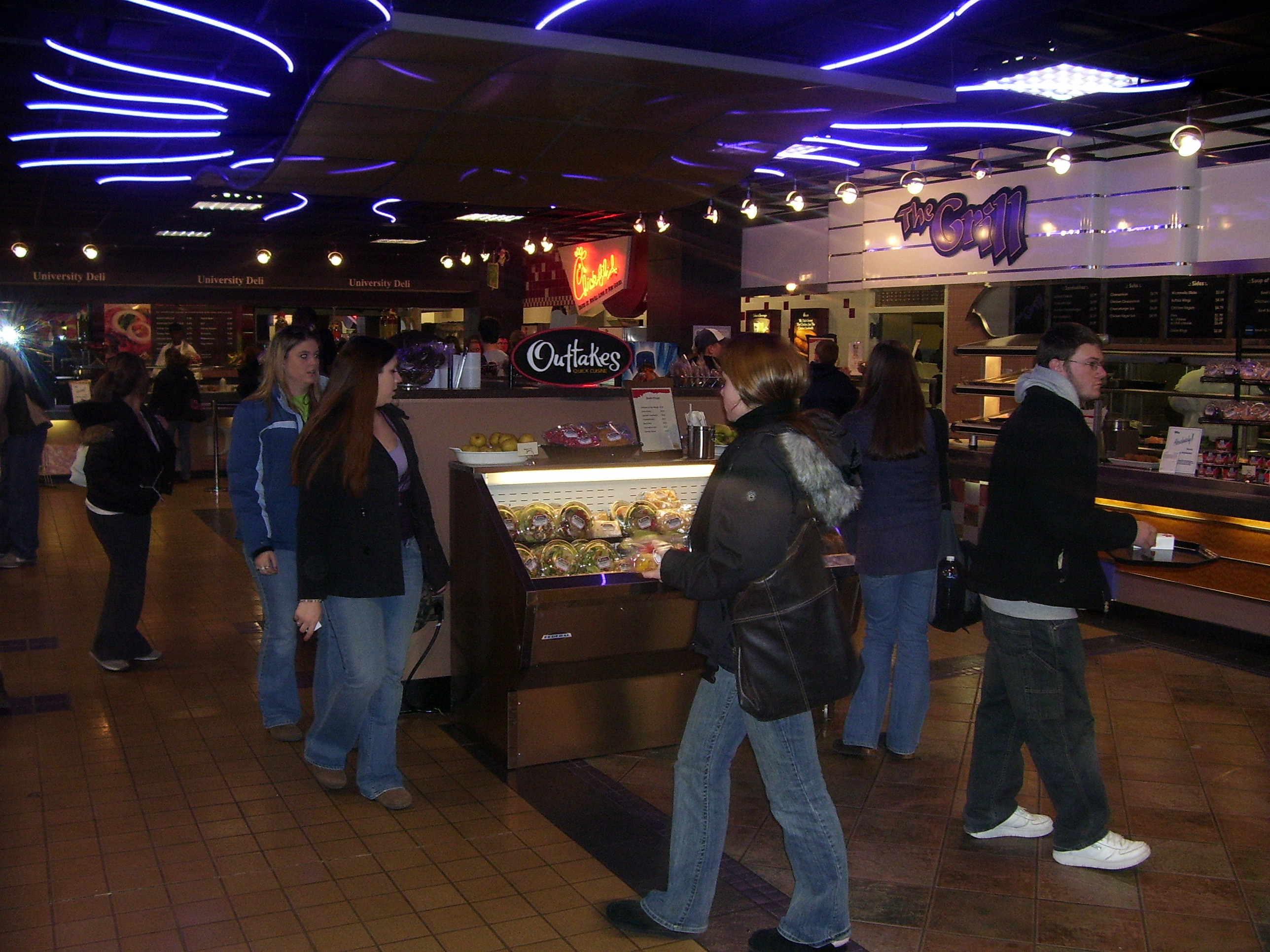
Susquehanna

== Campus landmarks ==
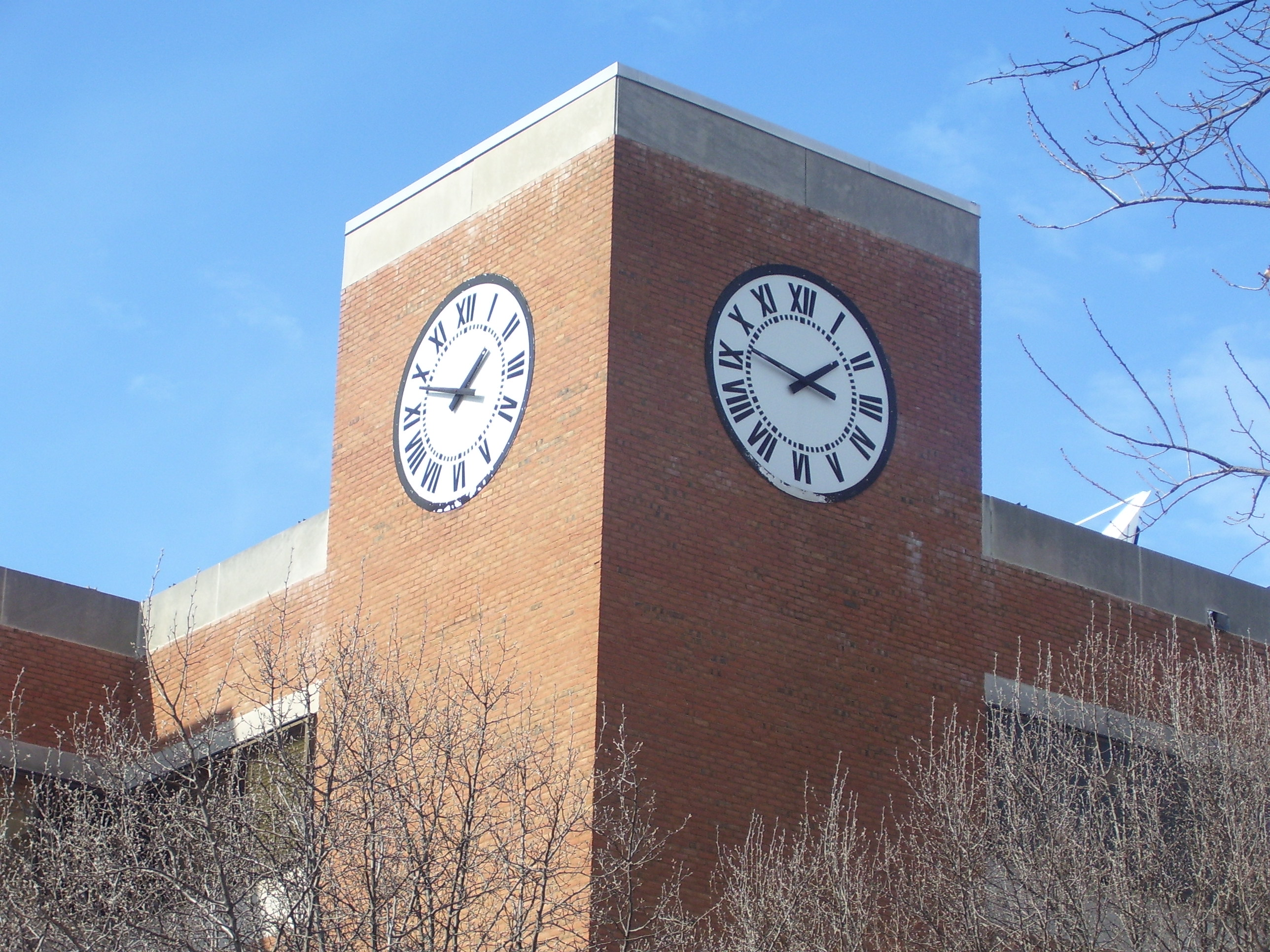
Clocks on the Psychology Building

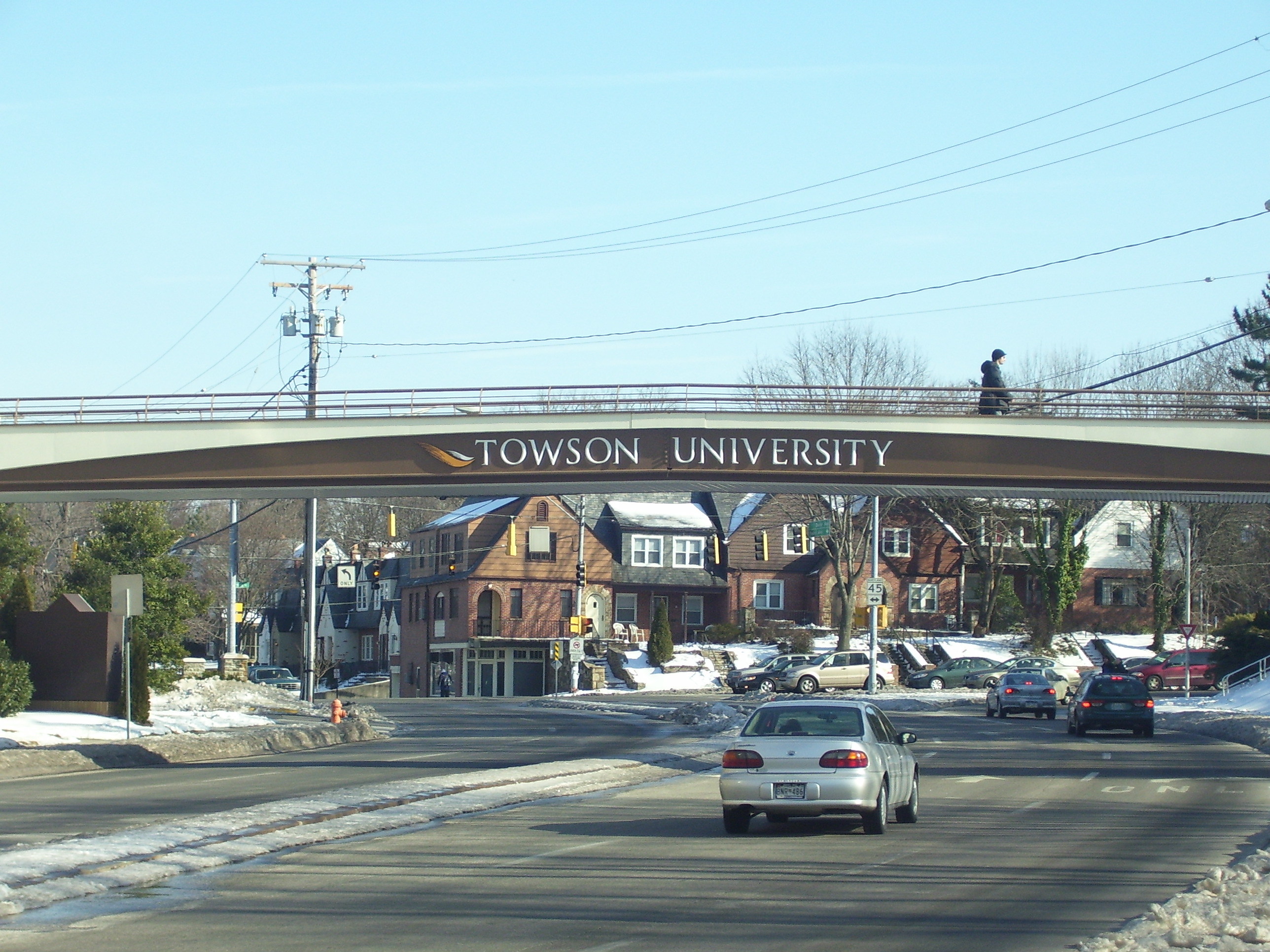
Burke Avenue Bridge

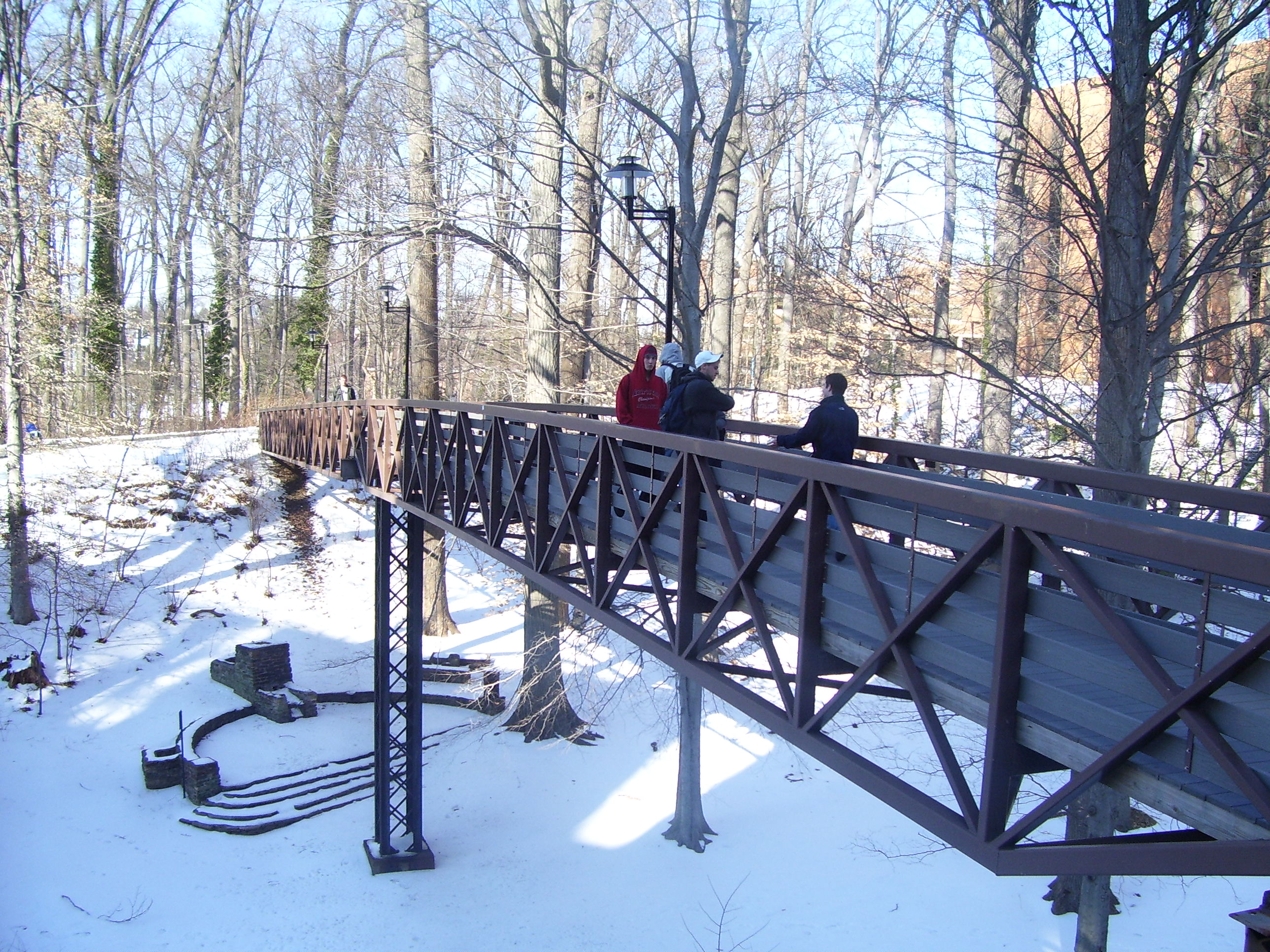
Glen Bridge

== History ==
Administration Hall (now Stephens Hall), Newell Hall, and the Power Plant were the first three original buildings built on the suburban Baltimore County campus in 1913–1915, which opened September 1915, facing York Road.

In 1936, the Works Progress Administration (W.P.A.), part of Roosevelt's "New Deal" program, had spent over $55,000 in its work on "The Glen". It included lodges which were used for open air classes and meetings, a council ring for ceremonies, and an amphitheater.

The original Lida Lee Tall building was renamed Van Bokkelen Hall in 1960, after the man and Episcopal priest, Libertus Van Bokkelen, who was authorized by the new third Maryland Constitution of 1864 and first served as Maryland State Superintendent of Public Instruction, in 1865, heading the developing, supervision and advising of public school systems for the various counties and funded the new Maryland State Normal School (M.S.N.S.).

After the school was moved to Towson in 1914–1915, Richmond became the first principal to live in the white, colonial style house "Glen Esk" (now near Prettyman Hall). This was the residence of one of the estates existing on the land facing York Road, south of old Towsontown that was secured for the school. However, in 1970, President James Fisher became the last to live in the "Glen Esk" house since the school moved to Towson. Because it was no longer suitable for a family, as students were occasionally found passed out on the lawn, it was eventually turned into the Counseling Center.

In 1971, as Earle T. Hawkins, former president of Towson State University, researched the school's history, he became especially interested in the meaning of the name of the house, "Glen Esk", now the counseling center. Hawkins published an article in The Baltimore Sun, in which he suggested he was trying to solve this mystery. In response, he received a letter from the wine and spirits importers Maynard and Child, Inc. of Scotland, who included a label from their brand of whiskey called "Glen Esk."

The Cook Library occupies space that was once a gymnasium. Prior to its opening, the current Media Center served as the Library.

George LaTour Smith, (whom Smith Hall is named after), died on his way home after getting hit by a locomotive. The administration felt that it was respectful to name the building in his honor.

== Notable people ==
- J. Charles Linthicum, of Linthicum, Maryland in Anne Arundel County, a graduate who served in the U.S. House of Representatives and pushed the bill to make the "Star Spangled Banner" the national anthem in March 1931.
- Dr. M. Bates Stephens, former Maryland State Superintendent.
- Libertus Van Bokkelen, first head of Maryland State School system, founded the Normal School.
- George L. Smith, the first head of the science department at the Normal School.
- Albert S. Cook, former Maryland State Superintendent for 21 years.
- Anita S. Dowell, a former faculty member and former Dean of the college, was largely responsible for the health instruction program of the college structured in 1953.
- Dr. Donald Minnegan served over 45 years at Towson, and was the only men's physical education faculty member for many of those years. Hawkins thought it would be fitting for the future field house to be named for him.

=== Presidents/Principals with buildings named after them ===
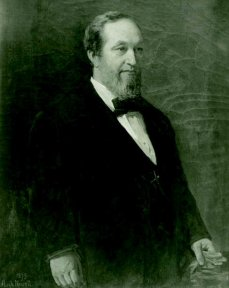
McFadden Alexander Newell
First Principal, Maryland State Normal School (MSNS), 1866–1890

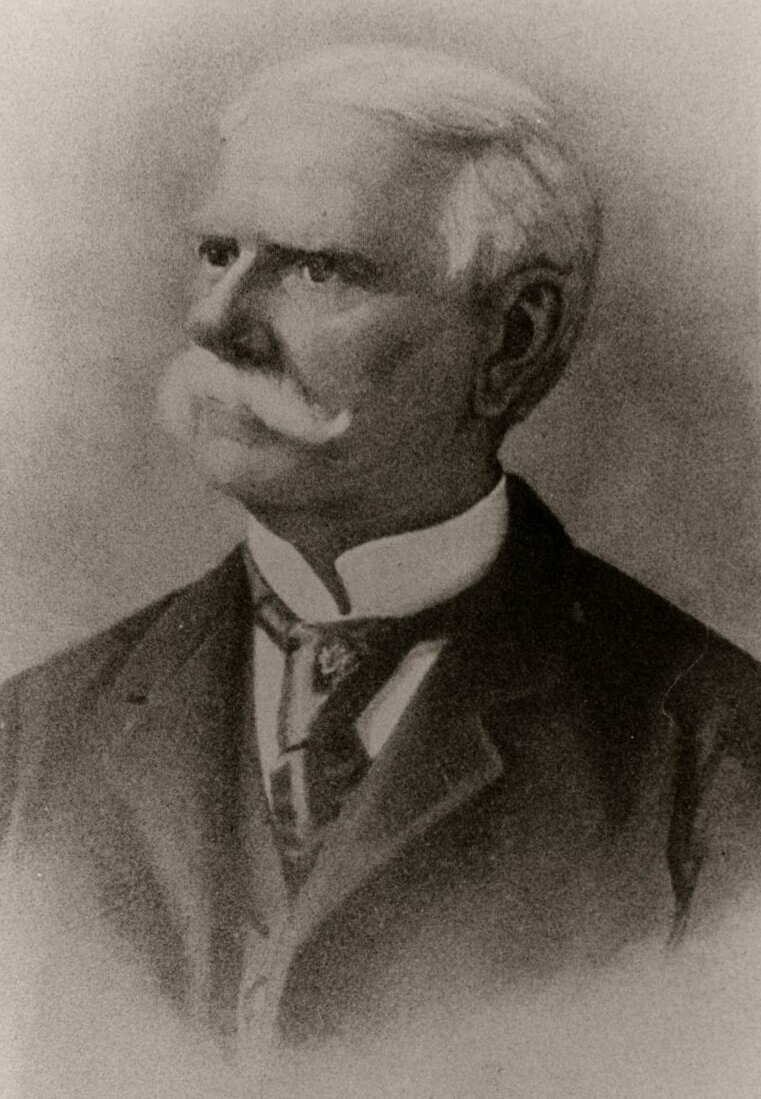
E. Barrett Prettyman (1830–1907)
Principal, MSNS, 1890–1905

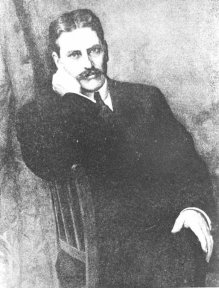
George W. Ward (1867–1932)
Principal, MSNS, 1905–1909

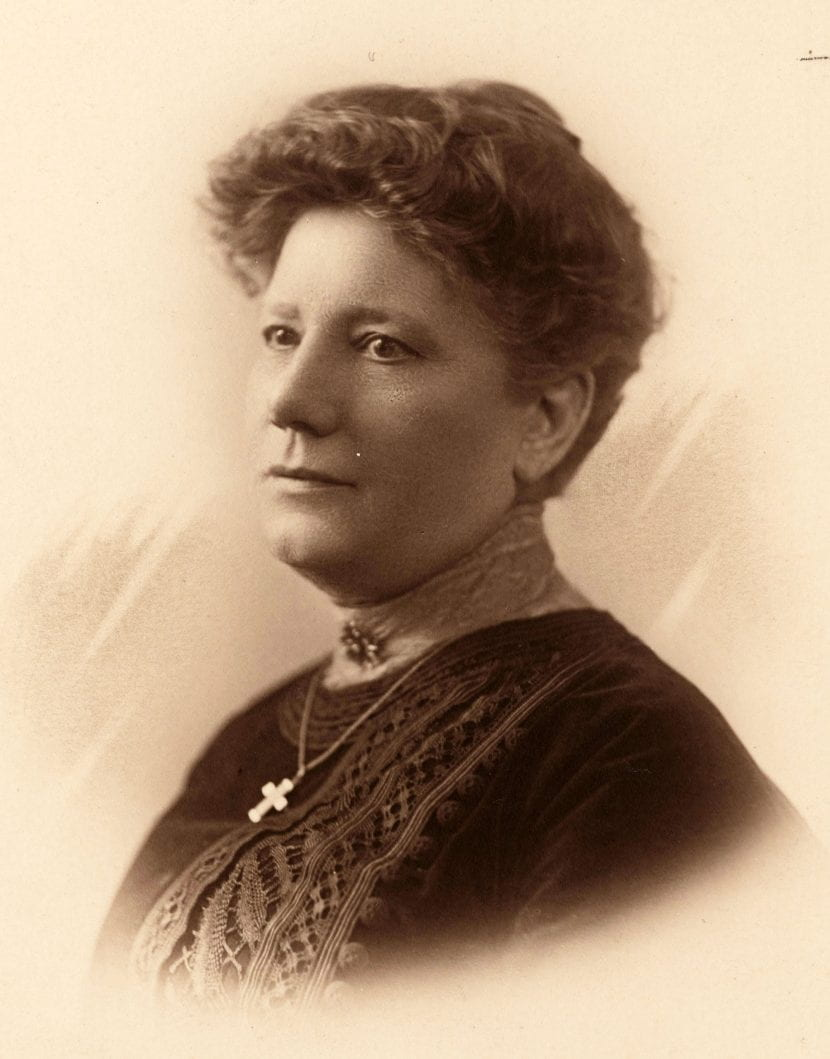
Sarah E. Richmond (1843–1921)
Principal, MSNS, 1909–1917
